= Roe Green (disambiguation) =

Roe Green is a suburb of Worsley in Greater Manchester, England.

Roe Green may also refer to the following places in England:

- Roe Green, Hatfield, Welwyn Hatfield, a suburb of Hatfield, see List of United Kingdom locations: Ri-Ror#Roa-Ror
- Roe Green, North Hertfordshire, a hamlet near Sandon, Hertfordshire
- Roe Green Village of Kingsbury, London
  - Roe Green Park
