= Parks and open spaces in the London Borough of Brent =

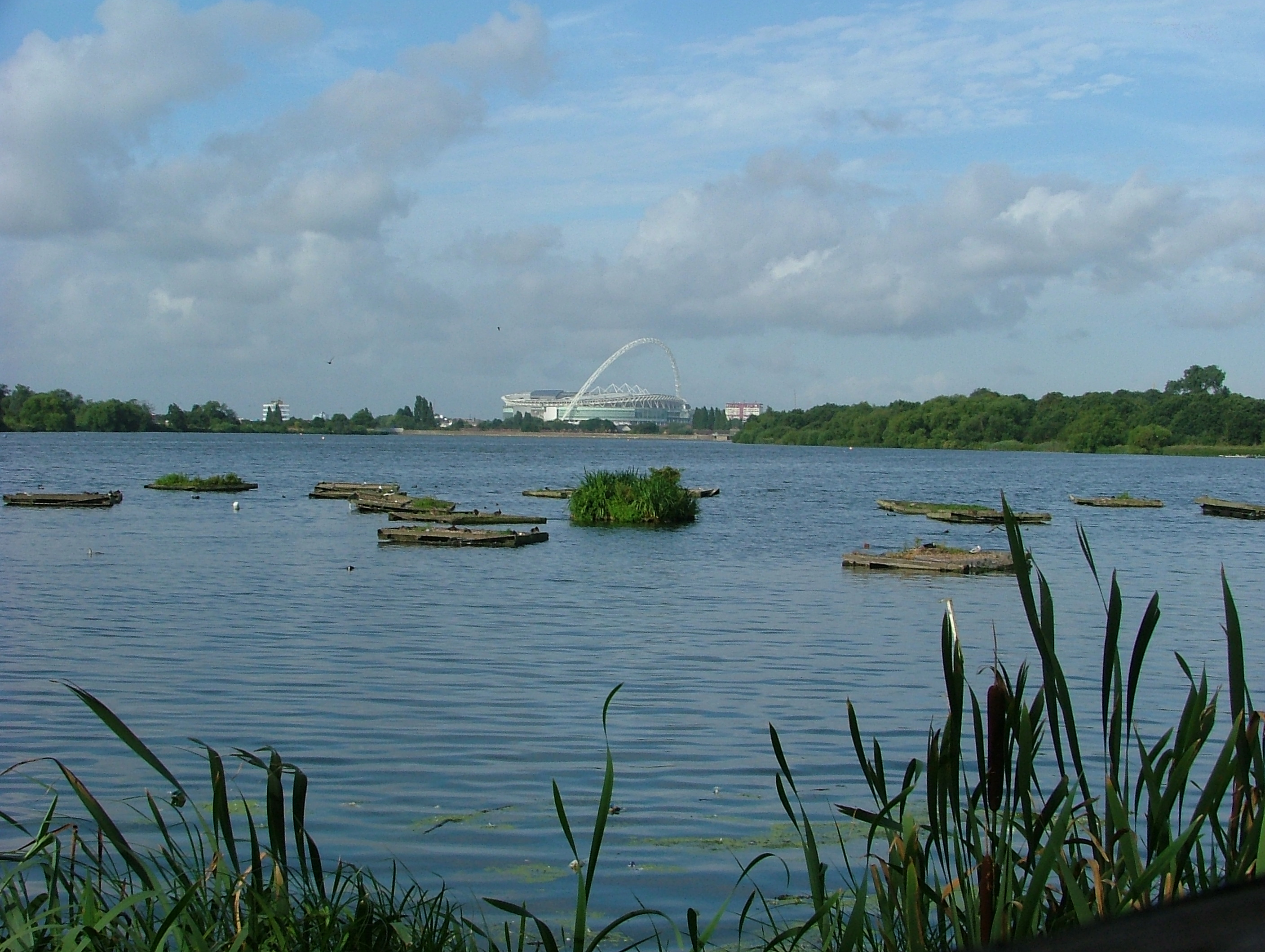
A view over the Welsh Harp reservoir.

The London Borough of Brent, an Outer London borough to the north west of the conurbation, has about 100 parks and open spaces within its boundaries. These include recreation and sports grounds, a large country park, and a large reservoir. The main areas of open space are:

- Barham Park, Sudbury: formal Victorian park, about 10.5 hectares
- (open space around) Brent Reservoir ("Welsh Harp"): partly in Barnet, about 170 hectares, Local Nature Reserve and the borough's only Site of Special Scientific Interest
- Elmwood Park, Sudbury Hill/Sudbury: views of Central London can be seen since the park lies on area of significant elevation.
- Fryent Country Park including Barn Hill Wood, Kingsbury: about 103 hectares, Local Nature Reserve
- Gladstone Park, Dollis Hill: opened May 1901, formal park named after William Ewart Gladstone, about 35 hectares
- Northwick Park, Kenton/Harrow
- Roe Green Park, Kingsbury
- Roundwood Park, Willesden: opened May 1895, formal Victorian park, about 10.27 hectares
- Queen's Park, Kilburn, Victorian park, administered by the City of London
- Roe Green Park, first opened c. 1920, about 16.83 hectares.
- Vale Farm Sports Ground, North Wembley
- Woodcock Park, Kenton
