= Linda Magistris =

British actress, TV presenter

Linda Magistris OBE
- Born: Linda P. Slater; 1963 (age 62–63); Willesden, Middlesex, England
- Occupations: Actress, television presenter, author, charity founder
- Years active: 1976–1991
- Known for: Grange Hill
- Spouse(s): Cesare Magistris (m. 1991, divorced); Graham Theakston (partner 2006–2014)
- Children: 2

Linda Magistris OBE (née Slater; born 1963) is a British former actress, television presenter, author and charity founder. She first came to prominence as a child actress in the BBC school drama Grange Hill, in which she played Susi McMahon between 1979 and 1981, and later became known for her work in bereavement support.

== Early life and education ==
Magistris was born in Willesden, Middlesex, in 1963. She is the daughter of Patrick M. Slater and Shirley Slater (née Taylor). She was raised in Kingsbury, north-west London, where she lived with her parents and her older sister Julie at Springfield Mount in The Hyde area. She attended Oliver Goldsmith Primary School and showed an early interest in performance.

She began dancing at the age of three and later trained at the Italia Conti Stage School in Clapham, travelling daily from Kingsbury. Her first major role came at the age of thirteen, when she was cast as Gerda in the BBC television adaptation of "The Snow Queen" (1976), following an audition at BBC Television Centre in Shepherd's Bush.

== Acting career ==
Following her debut in The Snow Queen, Magistris appeared in the ITV anthology series Armchair Thriller in the episode "Quiet As a Nun" (1978).

She gained wider recognition with her role as Susi McMahon in Grange Hill, appearing between 1979 and 1981 as part of the programme's early ensemble during its formative years. The series was filmed at Kingsbury High School, the local secondary school in the area where she had grown up.

She later reprised the role in the spin-off Tucker's Luck (1983) and also appeared in the television film Good at Art (1983).

During the 1980s, she also worked in theatre, including a production of Alice's Adventures in Wonderland at the Devonshire Park Theatre in Eastbourne in 1986.

Although she continued to work in television and theatre, she later recalled that she was increasingly offered less substantial roles, and her acting career came to an end in 1991 following her marriage.

=== Filmography ===
Year	Title	Role	Notes
1976	The Snow Queen	Gerda	Television film
1978	Armchair Thriller	Dodo	Episode: "Quiet As a Nun"
1979–1981	Grange Hill	Susi McMahon	31 episodes
1983	Tucker's Luck	Susi McMahon	2 episodes
1983	Good at Art	Kim	Television film

== Later career ==
After leaving acting, Magistris established a wedding consultancy business and worked as a wedding consultant during the 1990s.

She later returned to television as a presenter on the shopping channel QVC, working as a lifestyle and home-style presenter.

In 2007, she published Teach Yourself Your Wedding, a guide to wedding planning.

== Charity work and honours ==
Following the death of her partner, the television director Graham Theakston, Magistris founded The Good Grief Trust, a charity supporting bereaved people by connecting them with appropriate services.

The organisation also acts as secretariat to the All-Party Parliamentary Group on Bereavement Support.

For her services to bereaved people, she was appointed an Officer of the Order of the British Empire (OBE), and received the honour from William, Prince of Wales at Windsor Castle in September 2024.

== Personal life ==
Magistris married Italian restaurateur Cesare Magistris in 1991. They have two children.

Her later partner, Graham Theakston, died in 2014; his death prompted her to establish The Good Grief Trust.
