= Graham Theakston =

British television director (1952–2014)

Graham Theakston (29 February 1952 – 2 September 2014) was a British television director. He won a BAFTA Award for his work in The Politician's Wife (1995).

== Early life and education ==
Theakston was born and raised in Bradford to parents Doreen and Leonard, the latter an administrator in the wool industry. He attended Manchester Polytechnic, where he earned a degree in architecture.

== Personal life and death ==
Theakston was in a relationship with partner Jill Taylor from 1984 to 2005. Together, they shared a son, Tom, a professional musician. Theakston died of cancer in London on 2 September 2014. At the time of his death, Theakston was in a relationship with former Grange Hill actress Linda Magistris; his death prompted her to establish The Good Grief Trust.

== Selected Filmography ==
- The Lazarus Child (2004)
- The Mill on the Floss (1997 TV movie)
- The Tripods (1983)
