= Old St Andrew's Church, Kingsbury =

Coordinates: 51.5680°N 0.2618°W

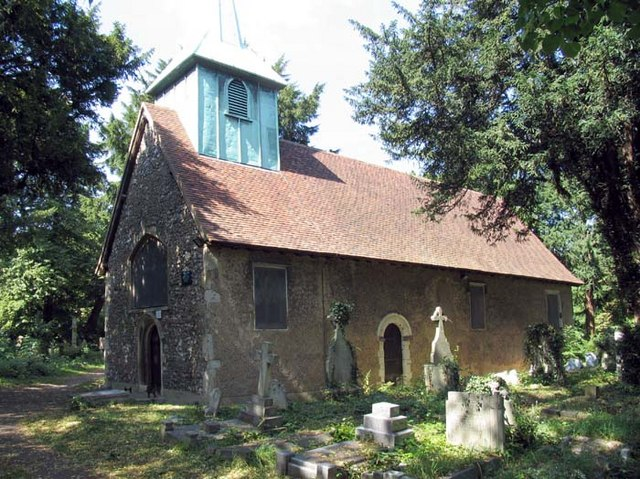
- Old St Andrew's Church, Kingsbury, from the southwest

- Location in Greater London
- Location: London Borough of Brent, Greater London
- Country: England
- Denomination: Romanian Orthodox Church
- Website: Churches Conservation Trust Romanian Cultural Centre

History
- Status: Active
- Dedication: Saint Andrew

Architecture
- Heritage designation: Grade I
- Designated: 6 October 1952
- Architectural type: Church
- Style: Gothic

Specifications
- Materials: Rendered flint rubble, with some Roman material

Old St Andrew's Church, Kingsbury, is a Romanian Orthodox and former Anglican church in Kingsbury in the London Borough of Brent, Greater London, England. It is recorded in the National Heritage List for England as a designated Grade I listed building, and is under the care of the Churches Conservation Trust.

== History ==
The present church dates from the 12th or the 13th century, and it is considered to be the oldest standing building in Brent. However an earlier church had been on the site, possibly from the Saxon period. By about 1244–48 the church had been appropriated to the hospital of St John of Jerusalem. In 1393 it had a dual dedication to Saint Andrew and Saint John the Baptist. Additions and alterations were made to the church in the 14th and 15th centuries. However, by 1796 it was in a dilapidated state. In 1840 it had a major restoration; the south porch, the roof bosses and the rood screen were removed. The exterior was covered in roughcast, a gallery was added and a brick vestry was built. The bellcote was rebuilt in 1870, and another restoration took place in 1888 when the vestry was removed, and a new vestry built on the north side of the church. In 1906 the roof was re-tiled, and there was a further restoration in 1955.

In 1884 a new church had been built in the parish, dedicated to the Holy Innocents, and St Andrew's became its chapel of ease. By the late 1920s, due to an increase in the size of the local population, the Holy Innocents church was too small. In 1933 a new church, also dedicated to Saint Andrew, was erected on a site close to the old church. This church had originated in 1847 in Wells Street in the Marylebone area of London. It was dismantled, transported and rebuilt in Kingsbury. The old church was declared redundant on 1 April 1977, and was vested in the Churches Conservation Trust on 7 October 2010.

=== Lease to the Romanian Orthodox Church ===
In 2008 the Church of England gave permission for Old St Andrew's Church to be used as a place of worship for north-west London's growing Romanian community. In 2012 the Romanian Orthodox Church was given a twenty-year lease for use of the church as a place of worship.

== Architecture ==
St Andrew's is constructed in rendered flint rubble, and contains some Roman bricks and tiles. It has a simple plan, consisting of a nave and a chancel in a single cell, a north vestry, and a turret at the west end surmounted by a spire. The font probably dates from the 13th century, and consists of a circular bowl with an octagonal rim, standing on a modern pedestal. The oak lectern dates from the 17th century; it was used by W. E. Gladstone when he visited the church and read the lesson. Also in the church are three brasses, the oldest dated 1520. There are three bells, dating from about 1350, from 1604, and from 1708.

== External features ==
In the churchyard are six structures, each of which has been listed at Grade II. Four of these are tombstones: these are to Timothy Wetherilt, who died in 1741, to Henry Wetherilt, who died in the same year, to Thomas Raworth, who died in 1744, and to Edwin Austin Abbey, an American painter, who died in 1911. The other structures are a monument to William Frederick Ashton, who died in 1802, and the chest tomb of Joseph Finch, who died in 1776.

== See also ==
- List of churches preserved by the Churches Conservation Trust in South East England
