= The Lazarus Child =

- Directed by: Graham Theakston
- Written by: Robert Mawson
- Produced by: Ciro Dammicco; Stefano Dammicco
- Starring: Andy García; Frances O'Connor; Angela Bassett; Harry Eden; Geraldine McEwan
- Cinematography: Lukas Strebel
- Edited by: Pamela Power
- Production company: Morgan Creek Productions
- Distributed by: Warner Bros.
- Release date: May 13, 2004 (United States)
- Running time: 93 minutes
- Country: United States
- Language: English

The Lazarus Child (entitled The Last Door in Canada) is a 2004 American horror film directed by Graham Theakston. It was filmed in Canada and the United Kingdom.

== Plot ==
The film covers the lives of a family after their young daughter is severely injured in a car crash. It is based on a book written in 1998 by the journalist Robert Mawson as his second novel. The plot revolves around the controversial but highly humane treatment of the traffic accident victim who is in a deep coma and can only be brought back to consciousness with the help of her older brother and a gifted neurologist doctor whose work is not recognised by the community. The consequences of this lack of understanding nearly wreck the healing process.

== Cast ==
- Andy García as Jack Heywood
- Frances O'Connor as Alison Heywood
- Angela Bassett as Dr. Elizabeth Chase
- Harry Eden as Ben Heywood
- Geraldine McEwan as Janet
- Jaimz Woolvett as Nathan Greenwater
