= Oliver Goldsmith Primary School =

Location
- Coniston Gardens; Kingsbury, London, London, NW9; England; 51.583289°N 0.257617°W

Information
- Type: Community primary
- Established: 1937
- Local authority: London Borough of Brent
- Department for Education URN: 101528 Tables
- Ofsted: Reports
- Headteacher: James Simmons
- Gender: Coeducational
- Age: 3 to 11
- Enrolment: c.430
- Website: olivergoldsmith.brent.sch.uk

Oliver Goldsmith Primary School is a primary school in Kingsbury, London, England, located on Coniston Gardens in the London Borough of Brent. It was opened in 1937 as part of Middlesex County Council’s programme of school building to serve the rapidly expanding suburban population of Kingsbury, replacing earlier educational provision centred on Kingsbury Road. The school serves pupils aged 3 to 11.

The school is named after the eighteenth-century writer Oliver Goldsmith, who lived nearby at Hyde Farm in Kingsbury during the 1770s. Its history reflects the development of education in the area from the late nineteenth century through suburban expansion, wartime disruption, and later changes in local education policy.

== History ==
=== Early education and pressure for a new school ===
Education in Kingsbury developed gradually during the nineteenth century, when the district was still largely rural. In 1870 a British school was opened at the Hyde end of Kingsbury Road, where about forty boys, girls and infants were taught by a schoolmistress. The school was financed through voluntary contributions, school pence and parliamentary grants. Inspectors soon criticised the cramped premises, and in 1876 the Kingsbury School Board replaced it with a board school providing accommodation for about 120 pupils.

The board school became Kingsbury Council School in 1903. Educational reorganisation followed during the 1920s as the population of the district increased. Infants were transferred to a new school in Kenton Lane in 1922, and when Kenton Lane Council School opened as a senior school in 1928 its younger pupils were moved to the older Kingsbury Road building.

By the early 1930s the Kingsbury Road school was widely considered inadequate for the rapidly growing suburban population. Parents complained of overcrowding and poor conditions, and in 1933 proposals were discussed for a school strike and a campaign of non-payment of local rates to force improvements. Reports described children being taught in basement rooms and vermin within the building.

At the same time the Middlesex Education Committee sought land for a new school to serve the expanding district, although progress was initially slowed by restrictions on government grants during the economic conditions of the early 1930s.

=== Opening of Oliver Goldsmith School ===
Oliver Goldsmith School opened in 1937 as part of Middlesex County Council’s programme of school construction to serve the rapidly expanding suburban population of Kingsbury. It was named after the eighteenth-century writer Oliver Goldsmith, who had lived locally at Hyde Farm.

The establishment of the new school represented a continuation of earlier provision centred on Kingsbury Road. The first headmaster of the junior department, Cecil Leonard Smith, had previously been headmaster of the Kingsbury Road Junior Mixed and Infants School and transferred to the new school on its opening in 1937.

The official opening ceremony took place in February 1938. Contemporary reports described the earlier Kingsbury Road premises as a "curiously shaped building" which local residents would not regret losing as a school.

In its early years the institution operated as separate infant and junior schools, each with its own leadership.

=== Second World War ===
During the Second World War the school was directly affected by wartime conditions. Its buildings were requisitioned by the Royal Navy for use as an emergency headquarters, and normal schooling was suspended for a period.

When pupils returned, school life was disrupted by frequent air raid alerts, and children were evacuated on a number of occasions during bombing raids. During this period the school also admitted a number of Jewish refugee children from Germany.

=== Later developments ===
The school appears regularly in local press coverage from the mid-twentieth century onwards, reflecting its role within the developing suburban community. Activities included sporting competitions and cultural events typical of primary education at the time. In 1956 a member of staff, Cyril Menders, wrote and produced a children's musical, The Shunastah Legend, which was performed by pupils at the school. The school was visited by the Parliamentary Under-Secretary of State for Education, Sir Rhodes Boyson, on 11 September 1979.

In 1990 the school was involved in a wider controversy over proposals by Brent Council to amalgamate infant and junior schools. Parents of pupils at Oliver Goldsmith opposed the plans, and the issue formed part of a broader public debate on education policy in the borough.

The school continued to develop its facilities in the late twentieth century. In 1986 Brent Council approved plans to increase nursery provision, and in 1996 construction began on a new classroom block following concerns about the condition of existing buildings.

The school has also been involved in community initiatives. In 1998 pupils and staff organised a large aid collection for victims of Hurricane Mitch in Central America.

== Architecture ==
The school building was designed by the architectural partnership Curtis and Burchett as part of Middlesex County Council’s programme of modern school construction during the inter-war period.

The design reflected contemporary ideas about school planning, emphasising improved lighting, ventilation and outdoor recreation space for pupils. The construction of the school formed part of the wider suburban development of Kingsbury during the 1920s and 1930s, when new housing estates in the area increased demand for modern educational facilities.

== Ofsted ==
Oliver Goldsmith Primary School has been inspected several times by Ofsted. Since the early 2000s the school has consistently been judged Good.

Ofsted inspection results
| Inspection date | Inspection type | Overall effectiveness | Headteacher | Report |
|---|---|---|---|---|
| 26 January 1998 | Full inspection | — | Susan Knowler | |
| 19–20 May 2003 | Full inspection | Good | Susan Knowler | |
| 31 Jan – 1 Feb 2008 | Full inspection | Good | Susan Knowler | |
| 12–13 January 2011 | Full inspection | Good | Susan Knowler | |
| 8–9 May 2014 | Full inspection | Good | Susan Knowler | |
| 19 June 2018 | Short inspection | Good (grade retained) | James Simmons | |
| 21–22 November 2023 | Full inspection | Good | James Simmons | |

== Headteachers ==
Known headteachers include:

- Cecil Leonard Smith (1937–1953), founding headmaster of the junior school.
- Susan Knowler (by the 1990s – 2014).
- James Simmons (2015–present).

== Notable former pupils ==
- Linda Slater – child actor who appeared in the BBC television production The Snow Queen. She later played Susi McMahon in the BBC school drama Grange Hill (1979–1981) and the spin-off series Tucker's Luck (1983).
