= Kingsbury Aviation =

Aircraft manufacturer in England

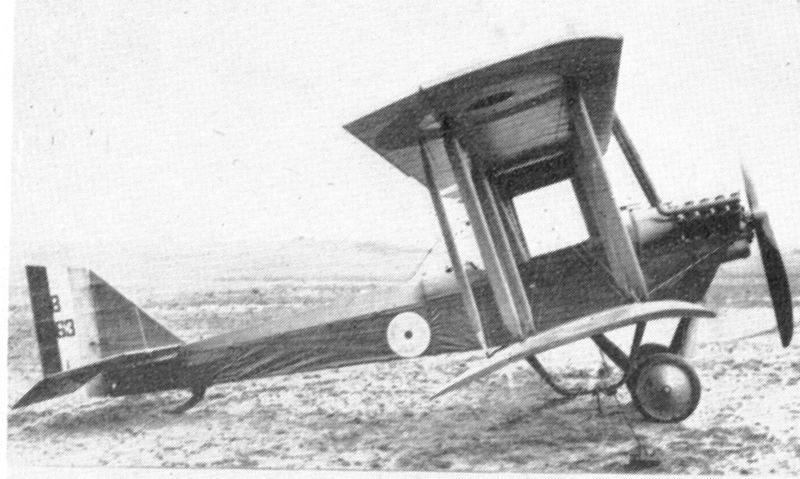
De Havilland DH.6

Kingsbury Aviation was an English aircraft manufacturer and engineering business based at Kingsbury Aerodrome, Kingsbury, London from 1916.

From 1915 the engineering company Barningham Limited used a building near Kingsbury House to manufacture equipment in support of the war effort. In 1916 it purchased the 109-acre Kingsury House estate and with planning permission for two hangars it created Kingsbury Aerodrome and formed a new company Kingsbury Aviation.

Kingsbury Aviation had a contract to build 150 Airco DH.6 training biplanes for the Royal Flying Corps (RFC) and by mid-1918 it employed 800 people on the site. The company had a contract to build 20 Vickers Vimy biplane bombers but with the end of the First World War the government contracts were cancelled. The company designed and built a motor scooter and a light car but they were not a success and they went into liquidation in 1921. After a few years of being empty the aerodrome and hangars were purchased by Vanden Plas to build motor car bodies.
