= Brian Michaels =

British theatre and opera director

Brian Michaels in 2017

Brian Michaels (12 April 1948) is a British theatre and opera director.

== Personal ==
Brian Michaels was born on 12 April 1948 in London. He grew up in Kingsbury, London. He studied philosophy at the University of Sussex, and has been a fan of Tottenham Hotspur since he was 5 years old. He has been living and working in Germany since 1973.

== Artistic background ==
In Germany his theatre career began in 1978 with the creation of "Il Teatro Siciliano" in Frankfort – the first immigrant theatre in Germany. His work with the group "I MACAP"., which he co-founded in 1981, was based on a re-invigoration of the traditions of the Commedia dell'arte. In 1984, the State Theatre in Stuttgart invited him to prepare his own version of Homer's "Odyssey" with young immigrants from the city.

== Opera ==
The success of this production lead to a number of opera productions for the Staatsoper Stuttgart – including Puccini's "Madama Butterfly" and Kagel's "Trahison Oral". In 1987, he directed Giuseppe Verdi's "Ernani" for the Bregenz Festival. His production of Ernst Krenek's "Three one-act Operas", was shown both in Stuttgart and the Vienna Festival (Wiener Festwochen). He directed a number of music theatre pieces for this festival between 1990 and 2002. Further festival work saw him develop the staging for Frank Zappa's "Yellow Shark", in close cooperation with Zappa and the "Ensemble Modern" (Frankfort, Berlin, Vienna), as well as two Baroque operas by Alessandro Scarlatti for the Innsbruck Festival of Early Music (Innsbrucker Festwochen der Alten Musik) (1995), and the Salzburg Whitsun Festival (2005). He then directed Joseph Haydn's "Feuersbrunst (Vienna Festival 2001), and Georg Benda's "Il Buon Marito", both in cooperation with Martin Haselböck and the Vienna Academy (Schwetzingen Festival Salamanca, Bilbao 2002/3).

Up until today, Brian Michaels has directed more than 40 operas nationally and internationally for both festivals and opera houses – amongst others in Basel, Nuremberg (with Christian Thielemann), Essen, Eisenach, Ulm, Darmstadt, Amsterdam, Los Angeles.

== Theatre ==
Brian Michaels has directed performances for the theatre in Essen, Basel, Munich, Hamburg (with Giora Feidman), Wuppertal, Düsseldorf, Halle, Kiel, Tel Aviv, Ramallah, Timișoara (Romania), New York and Los Angeles. He directed Hanoch Levin's "Murder" in Los Angeles in October/November 2001, immediately after the attacks on the World Trade Center in New York. His work has been shown regularly at both national and international festivals, including the Ruhrfestival Recklinghausen, Il Cantiere di Montepulciano (Italy), Steirischer Herbst Festival Graz (Austria), and the International Shakespeare Festival in Neuss (Germany).

One of his recent works is the production of Aristophanes' "Lysistrata" for the programme of the European Cultural Capital Paphos 2017. The performance was staged in a unique location, amidst the ruins of the Ancient City of Paphos.

In 2019 he directed and performed in the Jewish Polish Road Movie "Searching the Silence "- a piece which deals with the loss of the Jewish world and culture in Poland after the Second World War using dance (Kasia Gorczyca), video (Jakub Urbanski) and live music (Maciej Klich). It was premiered in the Centrum Dialogu Marek Edelman as part of the 75th Commemoration of the Liquidation of the Litzmannstadt (Lodz) Ghetto.

For over twenty years, he collaborated artistically with costume designer Beata Prochowska.

== Shakespeare ==
The plays of William Shakespeare have been the focal point of Brian Michaels' artistic work for almost two decades. The first of his 25 productions began with "Macbeth" at the Cantiere di Montepulciano in 1989, and continues with "Romeo and Juliet" in 2013 at the Folkwang University of Arts in Essen with 4th year acting students, up until today with "The Taming of the Shrew" in Bytom, Poland in 2017 (in Polish) and the same in an international version at the Shakespeare Festival in Essen, April 2018.

== Devised pieces ==
Among the devised theatre and performance pieces that Brian Michaels has created, "Osiris – Talking to the Dead" is of particular interest. The Ancient Egyptian texts are 3,500 years old. The project was the result of a close cooperation with the internationally renowned Egyptologist Jan Assmann, who translated the texts (Insel, 2008). The piece was shown at the Munich Biennale (2008), and in its final form in the Essen Zollverein (2009). In the play "Mixed Feelings" (2015), the focus is a fictional dialogue between a Palestinian actor, Nisreen Faour, and a European Jewish director. Michaels, both devised and acted in the piece, which has been shown in a number of German cities over the past two years. Furthermore: "The Journey" - a poetry performance with the Syrian-Jordanian poet Ramy Al-Asheq, 2018.

In 2019, he conceived and produced "Searching the Silence" for the 75th anniversary of the liquidation of the Litzmannstadt Ghetto at the Survivors' Park in Łódź (Polish: Park Ocalałych; seat of the Marek Edelman Dialogue Center), Poland. The piece deals with the loss of the Jewish world in contemporary Poland, using dance, music and film.

In 2021/22 he wrote and directed "Walking With Avraham", an installation performance at the NS Documentation Centre of the City of Cologne, Germany. The piece is a biographical narrative in 7 rooms that defines his own personal relationship to being Jewish.

In December 2022, he is collaborating with visual artist Kane Kampmann on her multi-level project "sichtbar machen". Both he and Kane Kampmann are concerned with the deportation of Cologne's Jews to Riga/Latvia on 7 December 1941. This work will be shown at the site of the deportation.

Brian Michaels created the idea of The Mythological Garden in a response to the Open Call from Eleusis 2023. His idea was one of transformation. Transforming old unused and barren industrial land into a flourishing garden, and thereby creating a very unique venue for artistic performance work. In collaboration with botanist Peter Pretscher and garden designer Tilmann Pretscher he collected a team of scientists and artists who worked diligently on the project until it could be completed in September 2023 in Eleusis/Elefsina.

== Teaching ==
Brian Michaels was Professor for Acting and Directing at the Folkwang University of the Arts in Essen from 1994 until 2013. He initiated a number of international cooperation projects amongst others with the Theatre Academy in Shanghai, the Crowne Troupe of Africa Lagos Nigeria, SP Escola de Teatro São Paulo, Brasil and the WTT PWST Bytom/Cracow, Poland.

Since the end of 2013, he has been Guest Professor for Acting and Directing at the Academy for Dance Theatre – WTT PWST Bytom/Cracow. Here he has found the opportunity to develop his own body based approach to acting – "Thinking with the body", which he originally conceived with the dancer Nadia Kevan.
