= Fryent Country Park =

Park in London, England

Coordinates: 51°34′39″N 00°16′21″W

Location of Fryent Country Park in Greater London

Fryent Country Park, together with Barn Hill Open Space, is a large park situated in the north of the London Borough of Brent. It covers 103 hectares (254 acres) of rolling fields and small woods.

Fryent was also a ward of the London Borough of Brent. Its population at the 2011 Census was 13,445.

== Significant features ==
Barn Hill in the south-west of the park is a wooded hill that rises to 86 metres (282 ft). A fish pond is found at the top of the Hill. Numerous other ponds can be seen in the rest of the park. Gotfords Hill (63 metres (207 ft)) and Beane Hill (65 metres (213 ft)) are other high points in the park. Parallel to Fryent Way is an ancient track known as Hell Lane or Eldestrete which may date back to Saxon times or earlier. Near the Slough Lane entrance is Bush Farm, one of the closest farms to the centre of London.

== Wildlife ==
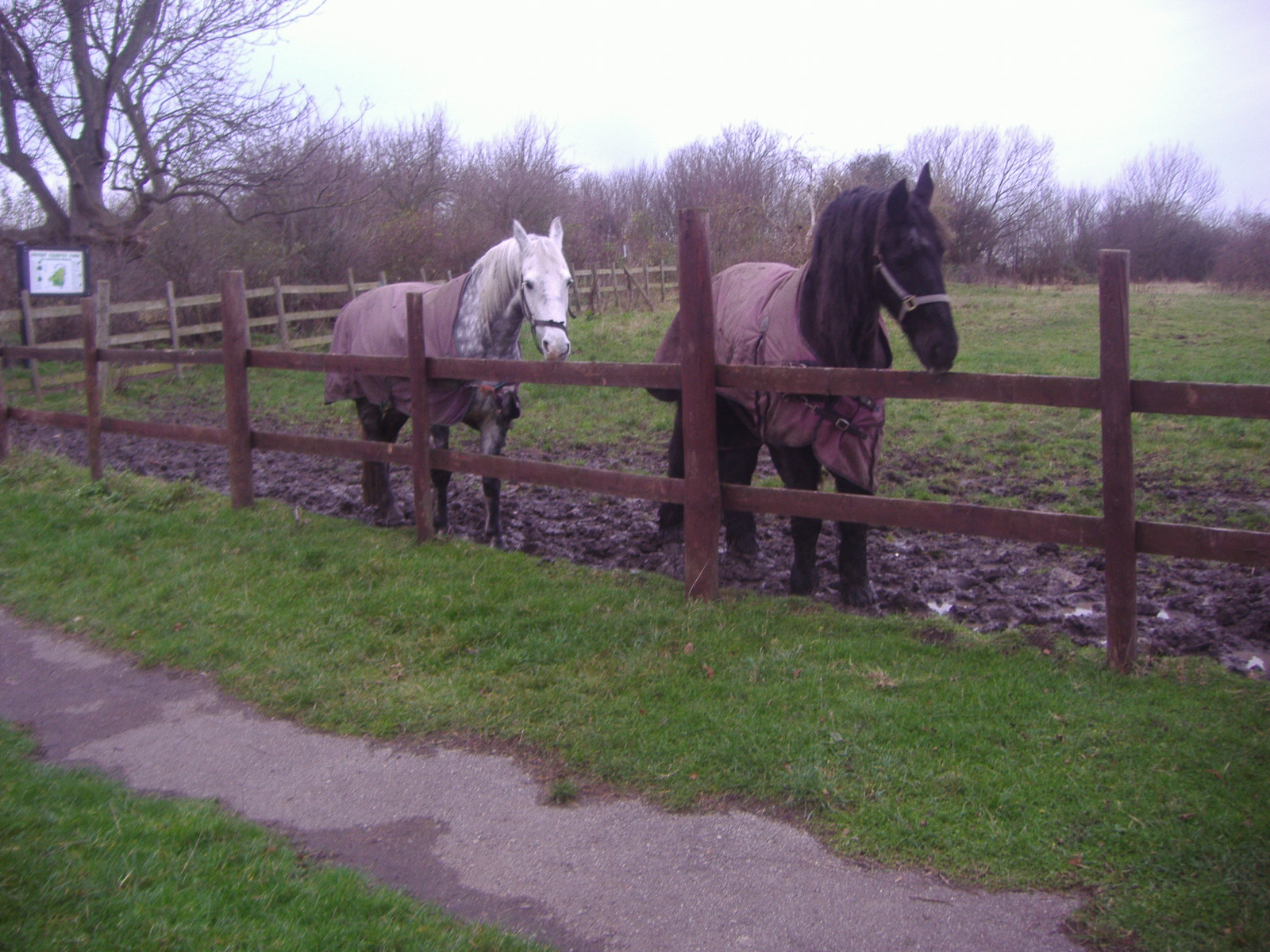
Horses at Fryent

The woodland comprises English oak, hornbeam, elm, ash and some fruit trees which also occur in the hedges along with blackthorn. The park is considered the best surviving example of Middlesex countryside in the Brent basin and has a population of the nationally rare plant the narrow-leaved bitter-cress (Cardamine impatiens).

== History ==
Barn Hill, called Bardonhill in 1547, was landscaped by Humphry Repton in 1792 as part of a local landowner's country park. The Fryent Park hay meadows are small remnants of two manors, one originally in the ownership of King Edward the Confessor.

== Access ==
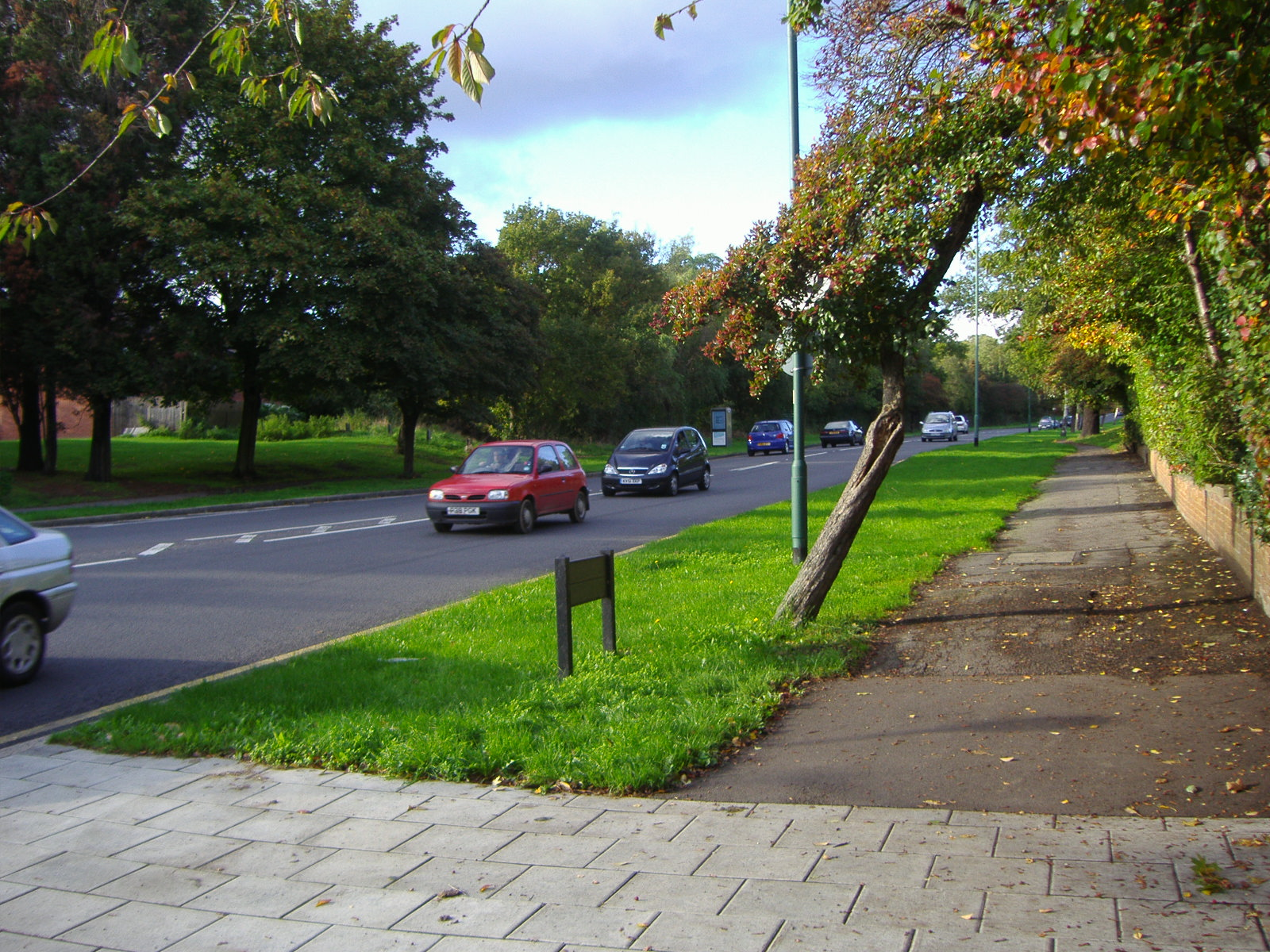
Fryent Way

The park is bisected by the A4140 Fryent Way that links Kingsbury with Wembley, and which leads south-east towards the North Circular Road. A car park is available halfway down this road. The nearest underground is at Kingsbury Station on the Jubilee line, while the Barn Hill Open Area, or at least the summit of it, is nearer to Wembley Park and Preston Road stations. The 206 bus terminates on the south side of the park and other bus routes run to the east (Church Lane), north (Kingsbury Road) and west (Preston Hill). The Capital Ring footpath crosses the site. However, the road Fryent Way, linking Kingsbury Circle and Salmon Street, has no bus service.

== Awards ==
Fryent Country Park was awarded a Green Flag Award in 2010/2011 for being a well-managed park or open space. The Green Flag Award scheme is the benchmark national standard for parks and green spaces in England and Wales. It is also a Local Nature Reserve.

In 2014 London in Bloom awarded the park a silver gilt award in its Country Park of the Year category.

== Sport ==
The Liddiard Cup cross country race is annually staged here in late October.

== Gallery ==
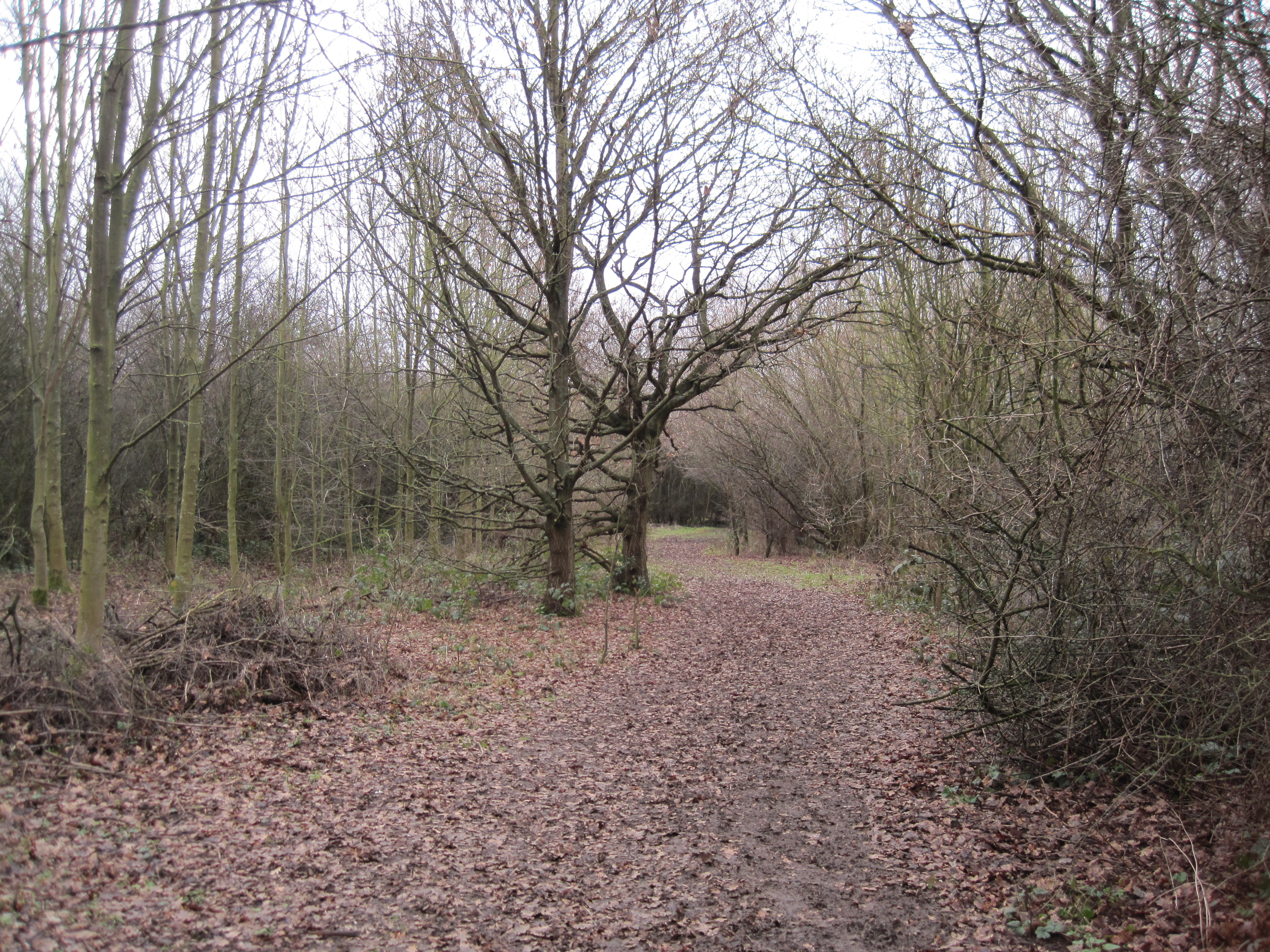
Path in woods

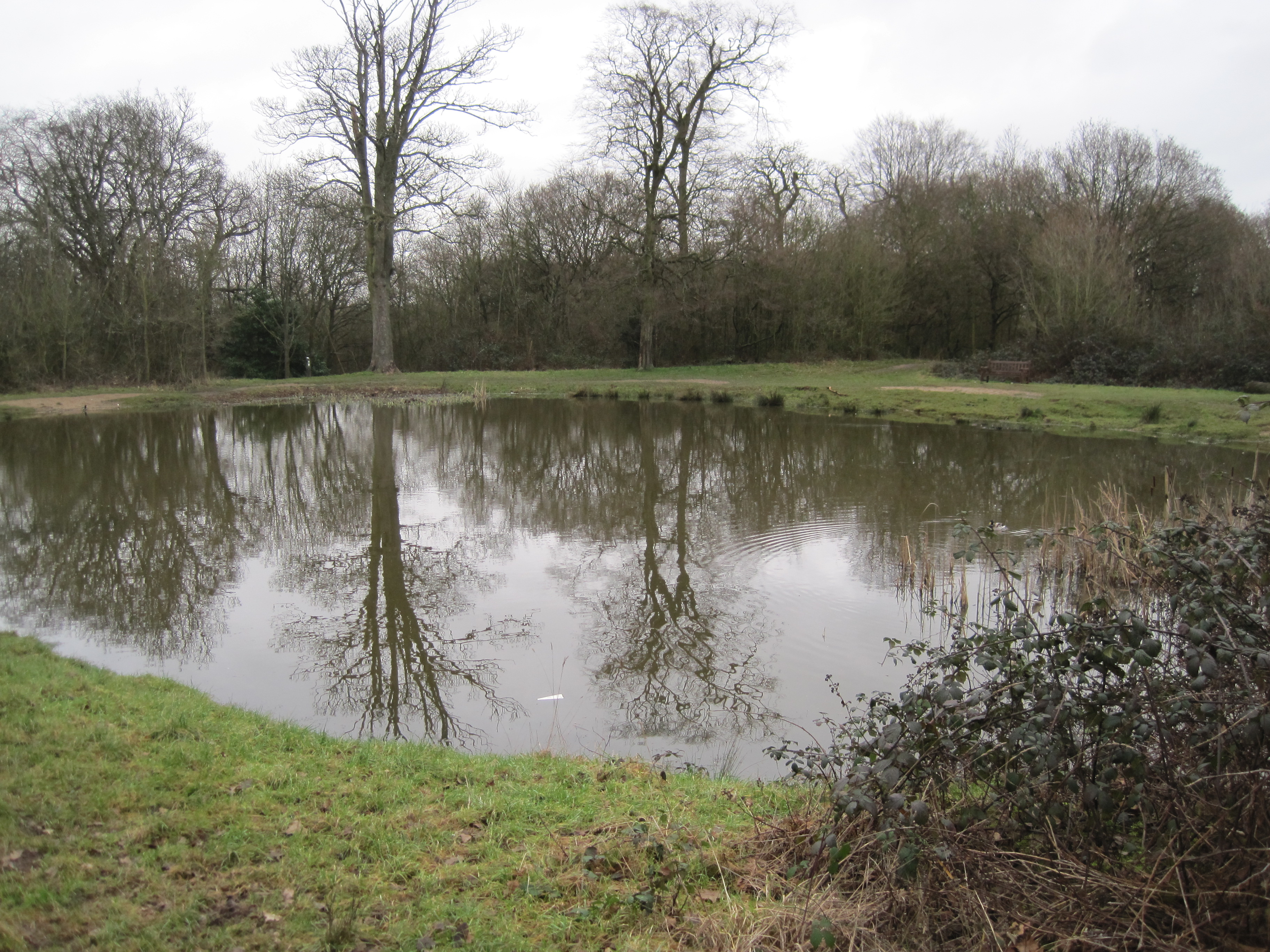
Barn Hill Pond

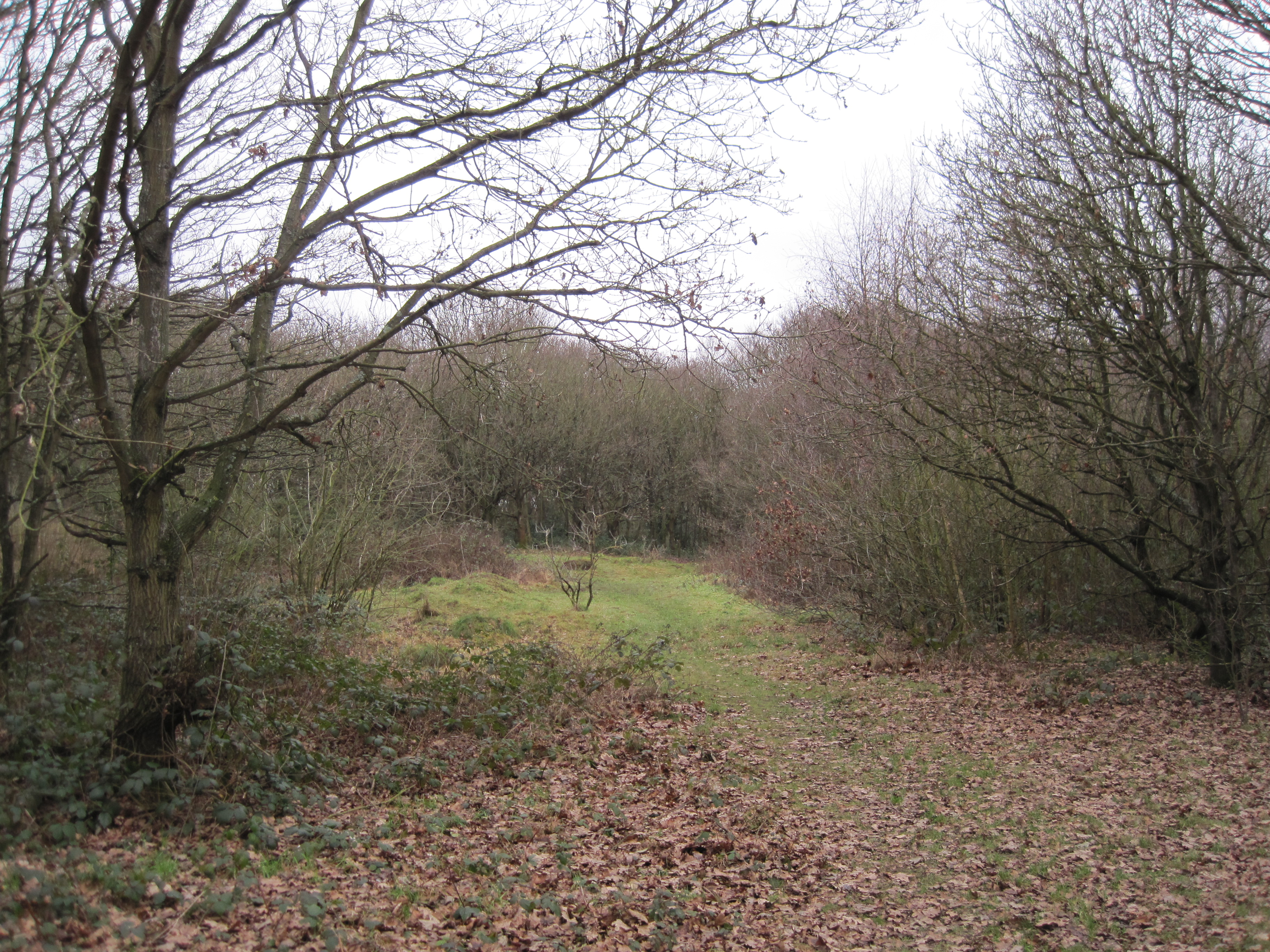
Clearing

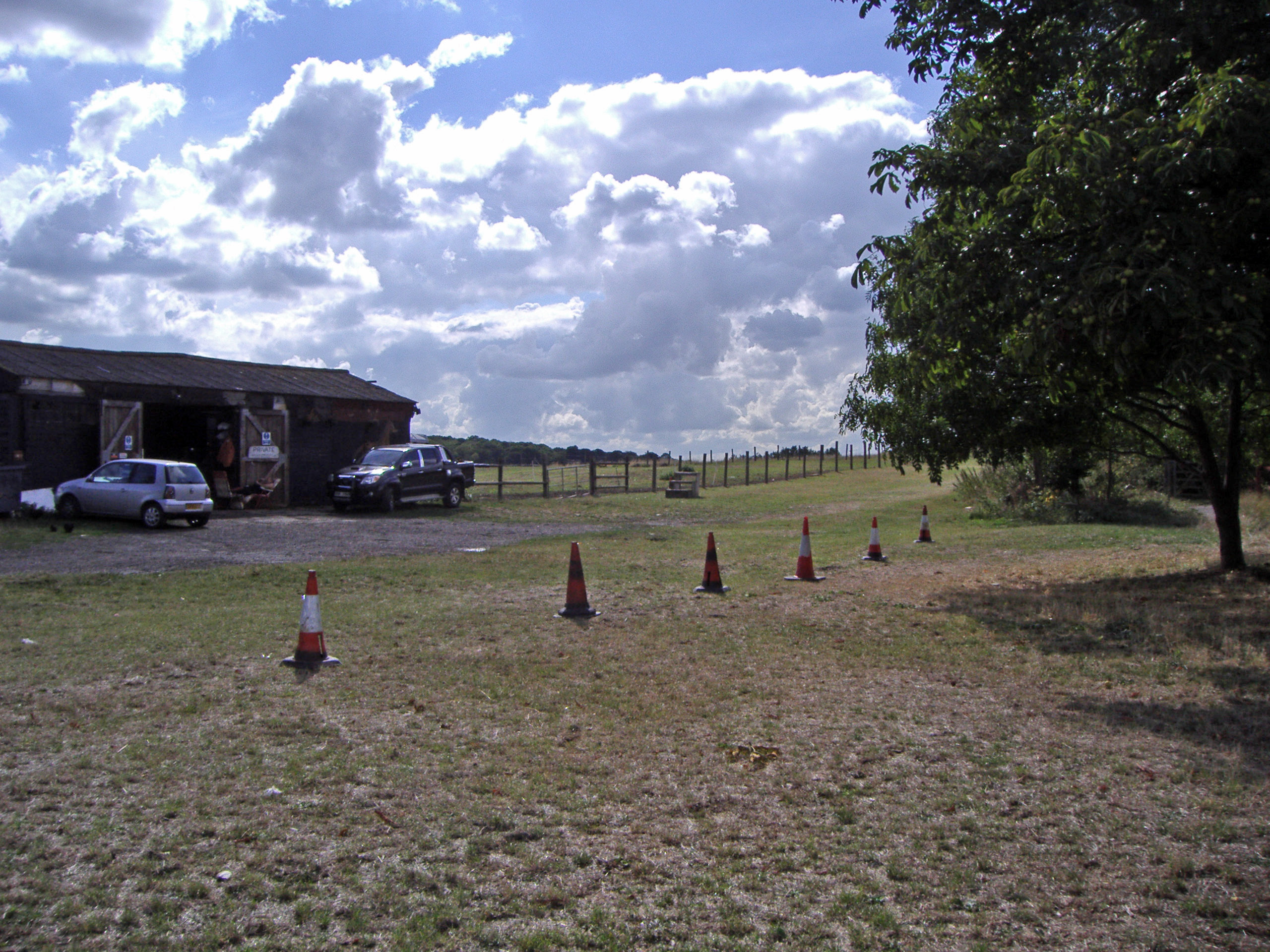
Fryent farm on the east side

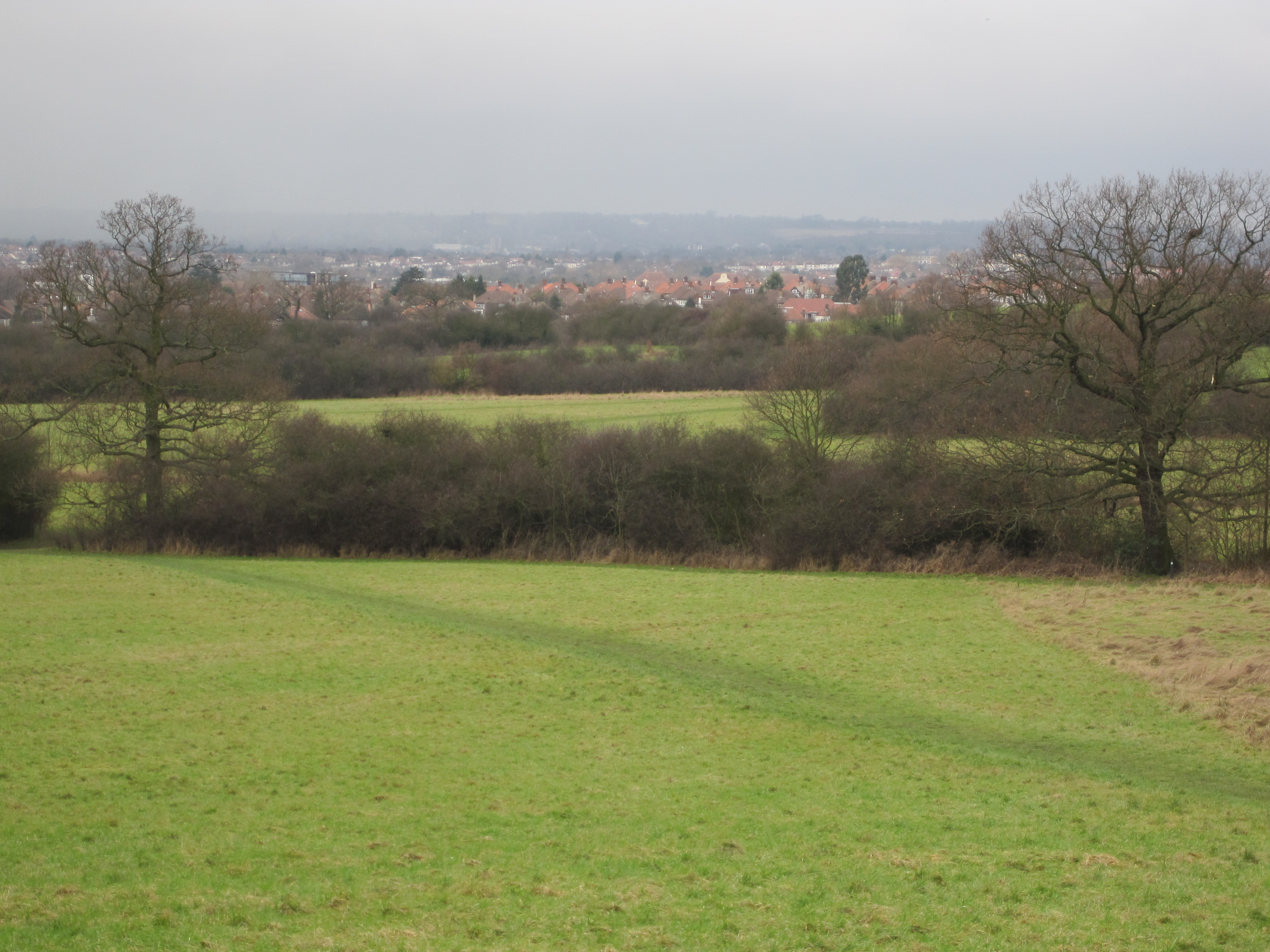
View north from Gotfords Hill

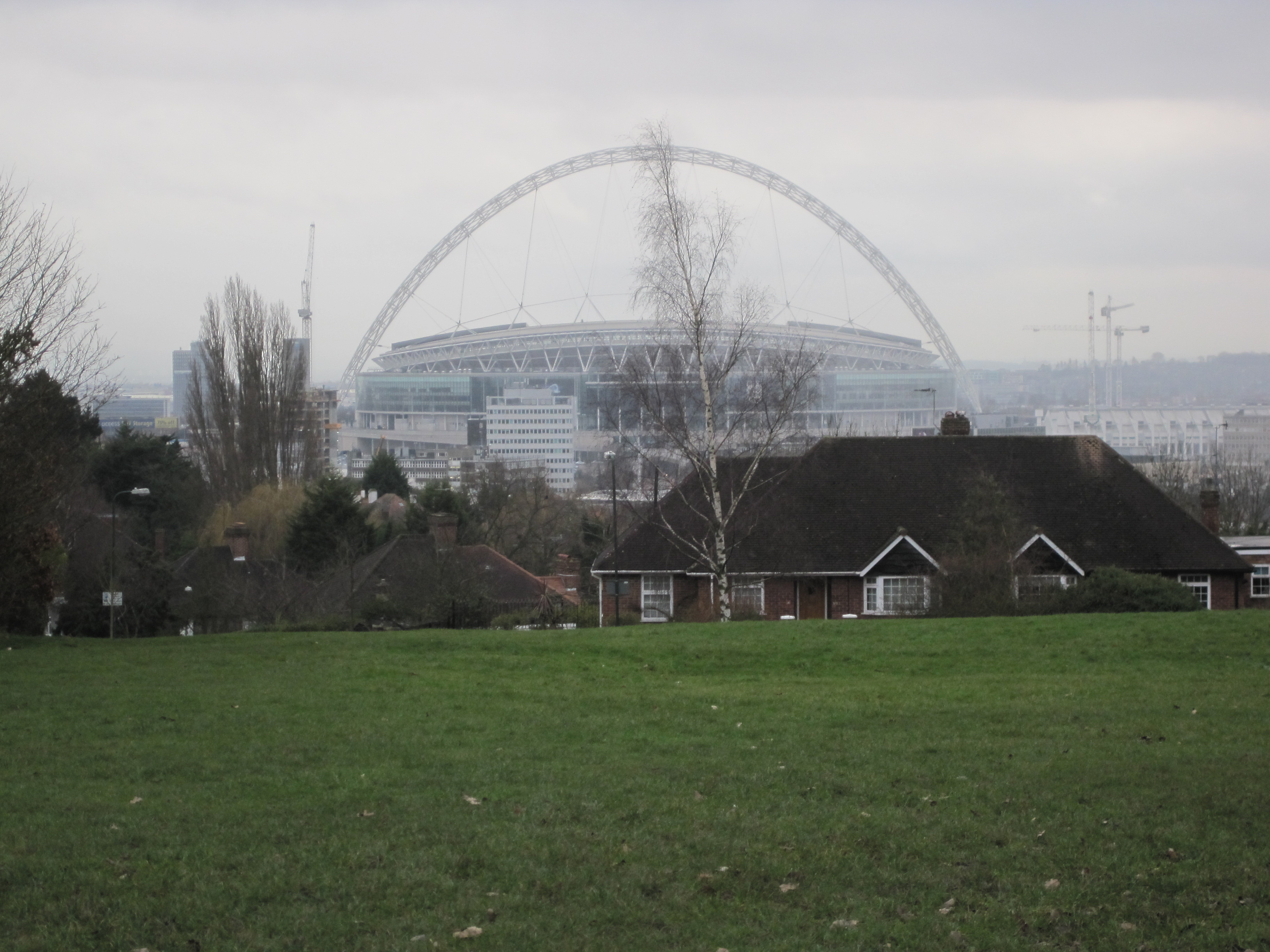
View of Wembley Stadium from Barn Hill

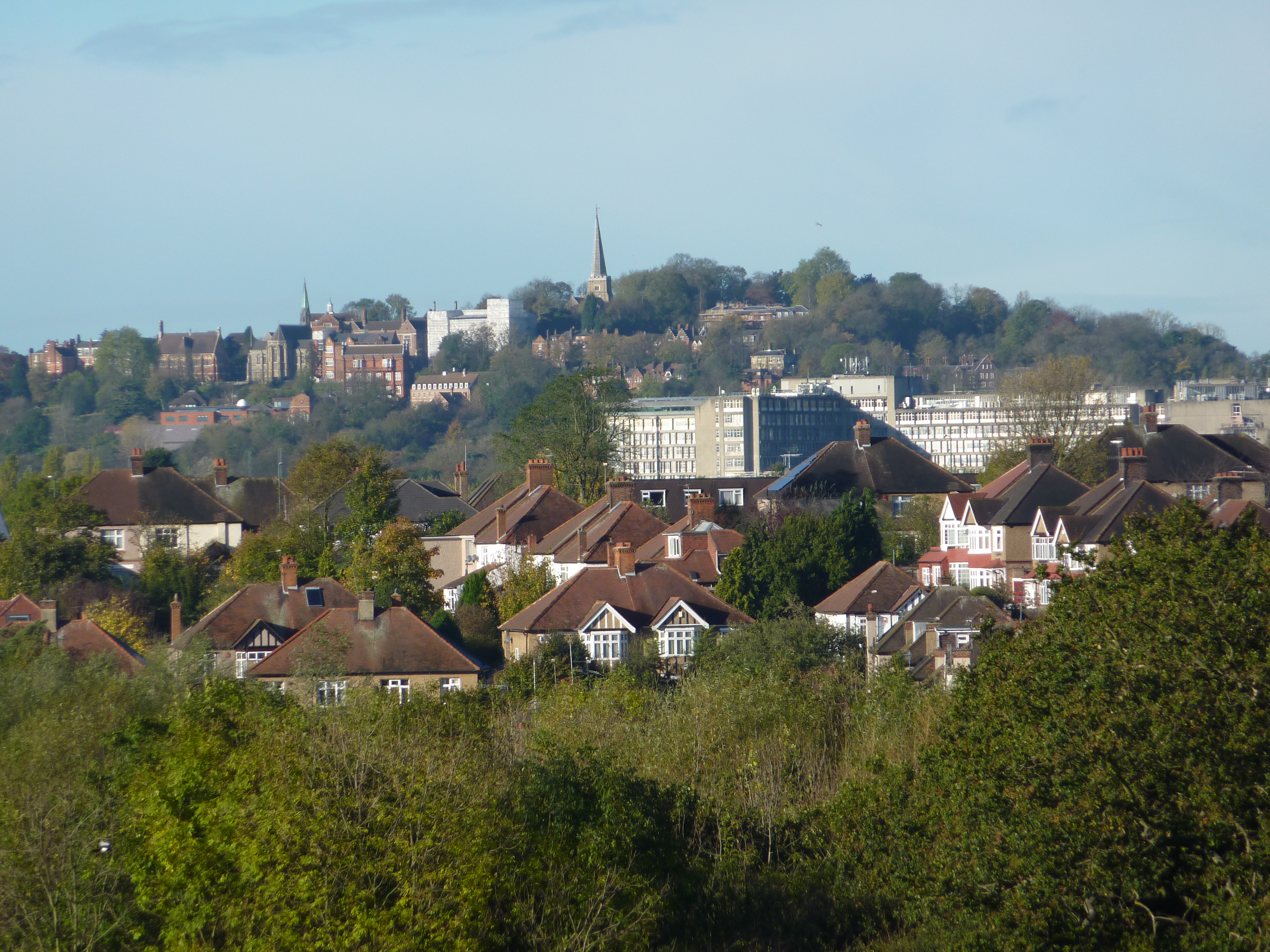
View of Northwick Park Hospital and Harrow on the Hill from Barn Hill

== Bibliography ==
Ordnance Survey. (2006). No. 173 Explorer Map: London North. Southampton: Ordnance Survey.

Snow, Len. (1990). Brent, Wembley, Willesden and Kingsbury: A pictorial history. Chichester: Phillimore & Co Ltd.

== See also ==
- Parks and open spaces in the London Borough of Brent
- Murders of Bibaa Henry and Nicole Smallman (2020 double murder in the park)
