= Roe Green Park =

Park in Kingsbury, London, England

Coordinates: 51.587°N 0.271°W

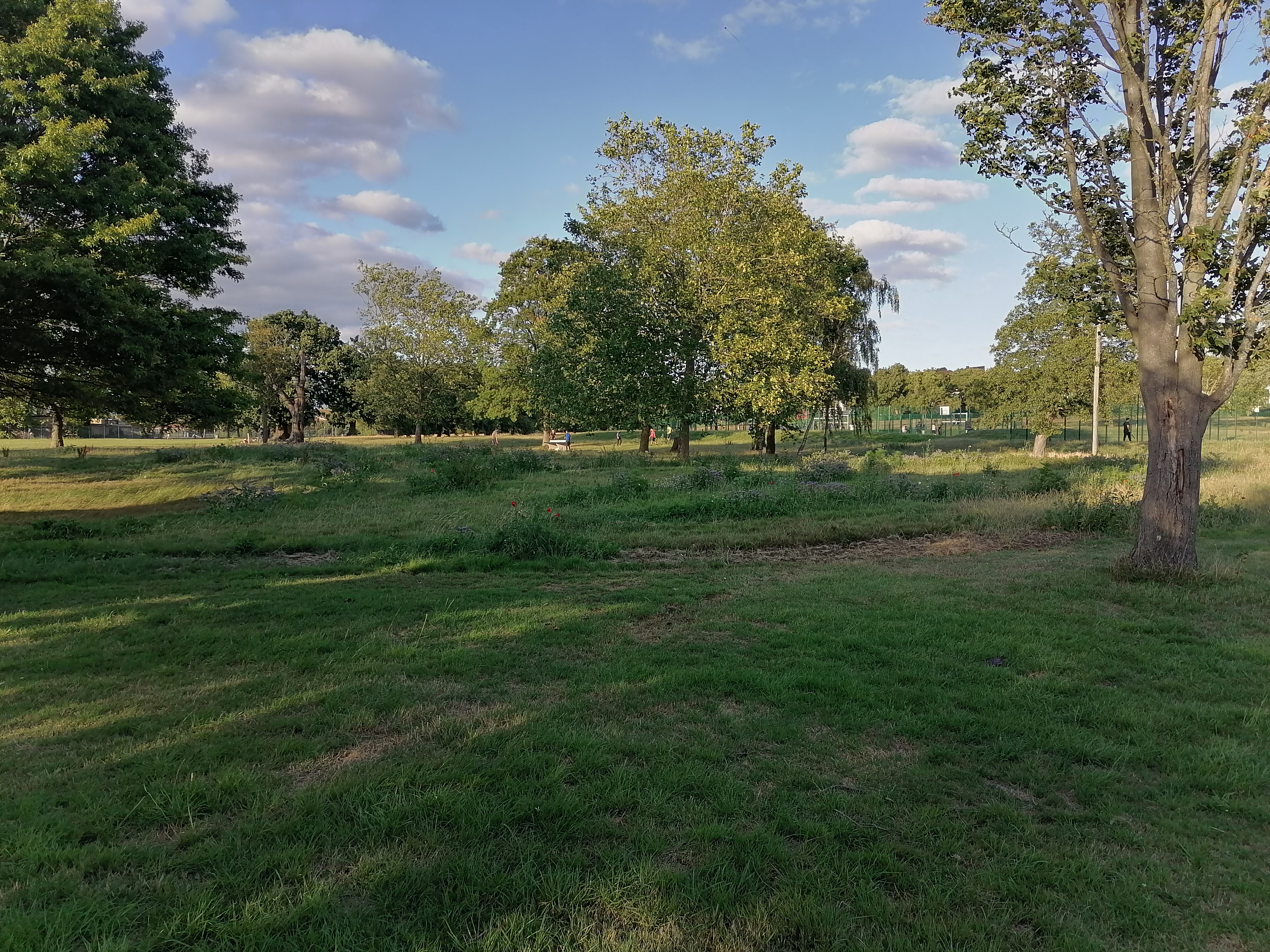
Trees

Roe Green Park is a park in the London Borough of Brent, northwest London, England. The Barn Hill Conservation Group maintain the Roe Green walled garden that is within the park. Roe Green Village was built between 1918 and 1920, using Prussian/German prisoners of war as cheap labour after World War I. The park was incorporated and thus taken under council control between 1935 and 1938.

== History ==
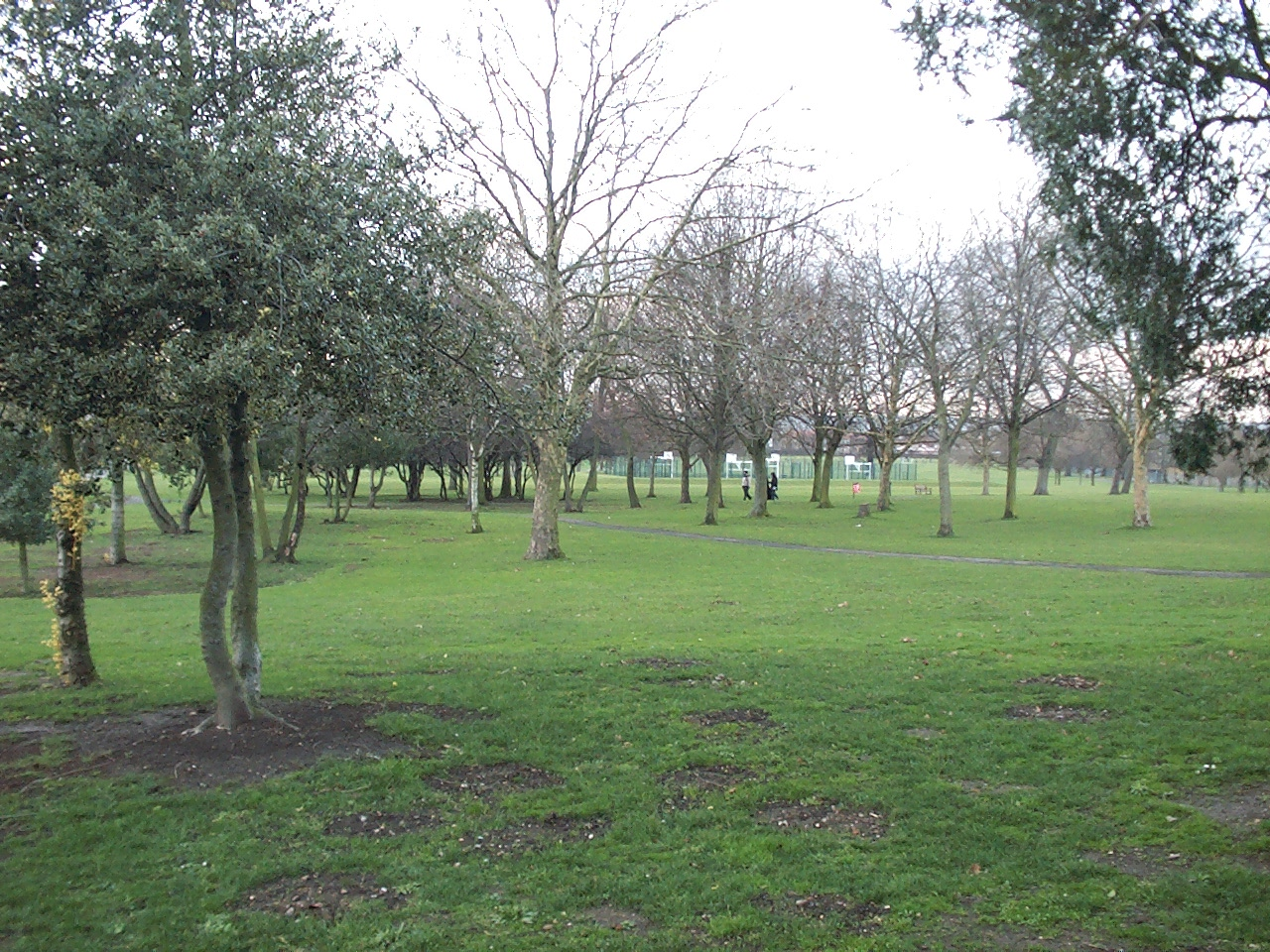
The basketball court in the background located in Roe Green Park in 2008

This now much used park in Kingsbury came about because of the rapid growth of suburban housing in this part of the district in the early 1930s. In 1933 the local Council identified a 5-acre (2.0 ha) site on the north side of Kingsbury Road for a park, but this was subject to plans for housing (Manor Close) by the developer, George Cloke. He had moved into Kingsbury Manor in 1929, and bought most of the land of Valley Farm the following year. Under pressure from the local Ratepayers' Association, the Council negotiated with Mr Cloke to purchase some of his other land for a park, and in March 1935 two fields on the south side of Bacon Lane (about 21 acres) were bought for about £27,000, with Middlesex County Council contributing 25% of the money. As the entrance to this new park was from Roe Green, it was given the name "Roe Green Park".

While the purchase was going through, Wembley Urban District Council decided to use part of the park fronting Kingsbury Road as the site for an open air swimming pool. In 1936 and 1937 Roe Green Park was used as the venue for a week-long Carnival and Fete to raise money for Wembley Hospital (which was run by a charity in these days before the National Health Service) and also for brass band concerts on summer Sunday evenings, but these events were transferred to Silver Jubilee Park when work started on building Kingsbury Swimming Pool in 1938. The Olympic-sized pool opened in May 1939.

After buying the two fields, the Council wanted to acquire further land, to make the park more accessible from the main shopping centre and Kingsbury Station. After three years of negotiations, they bought the 5-acre (2.0 ha) Westcroft field for £13,750 from another local developer, Henry Higinbotham, in 1938. In the same year, Kingsbury Manor and its 10-acre (4.0 ha) grounds were purchased from George Cloke. This was a joint purchase with Middlesex County Council, who wanted to use the large, secluded house as a Maternity Hostel for unmarried mothers.

The land for the park as it now exists had been acquired, but soon the outbreak of the Second World War meant that all of the park was ploughed up to provide allotments where local people could grow vegetables and fruit. After the war, twenty "pre-fab" bungalows were built along the Kingsbury Road edge of the park between the swimming pool and the Kingsbury Manor lodge, as emergency housing for families, and it was only around 1960 that local residents could enjoy the use of all of the park again.

The pool was closed in 1988 and demolished a few years later, replaced by green pitches.

=== John Logie Baird ===
John Logie Baird, the television pioneer, leased the former stables and coach house at Kingsbury Manor in 1928. He employed H. Barton-Chapple to take charge of his experiments there, which included designing and building prototype TV receivers. In May 1929, two 25-metre high masts were erected, and the first international moving picture transmissions, from Berlin in Germany to England, were received here. The following year, the first combined sound and vision signals were received. For many years afterwards the former stables were known as Kingsbury Manor Studio, and are now the home of Kingsbury Veterans' Club. The masts were taken down at the start of the Second World War, as they would have been a landmark for German bombers, but the concrete base of one of the masts can still be seen in Roe Green Park. A plaque to commemorate Baird's work here was unveiled next to this by Wembley History Society in the 1950s, which was moved to the Veterans' Club after damage by vandals.

=== Homicide ===
The park was in the news headlines in February 2002 when the fire-blistered body of an 18-year-old Sri Lankan man was found there. A year later, four other Sri Lankans – including ring-leader Senthamil Thillainathan – were found guilty of murder and sentenced to life imprisonment. Senthamil had also murdered another man in an axe attack in nearby Wembley eight months earlier.

=== George Michael ===
The video for the 2004 single "Round Here" from George Michael's fifth solo album, Patience, features several clips of Roe Green Park. The song is about the singer's childhood, and includes the lyric "I hear my mamma call/In Kingsbury Park".
