= Kingsbury, London =

District in London, England

Coordinates: 51.5826°N 0.2743°W

Kingsbury
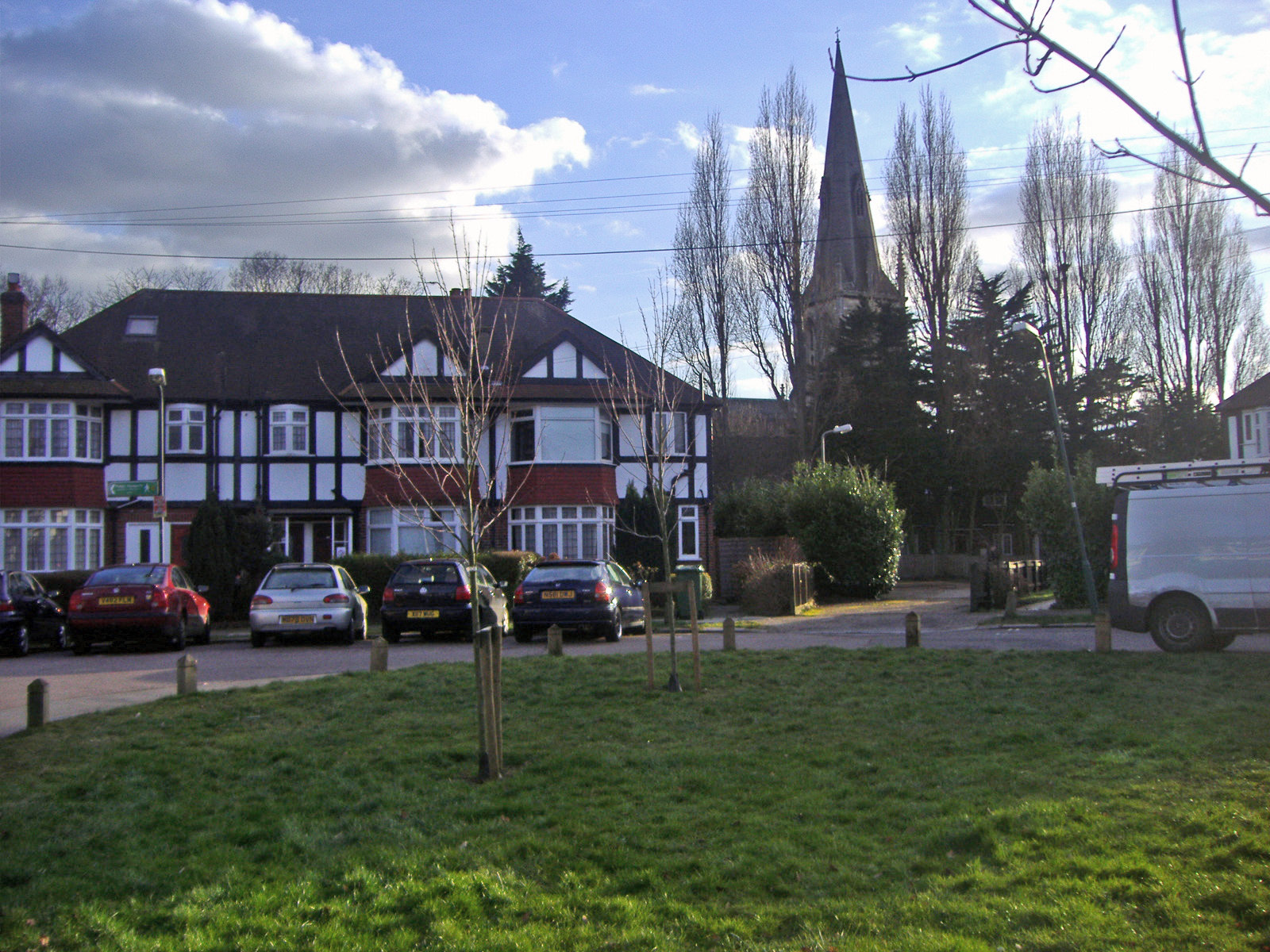
- St Andrews Road and Church, Kingsbury

- Location within Greater London
- Area: 5.63 km^{2} (2.17 sq mi)
- Population: 29,217
  - Density: 5,190/km^{2} (13,400/sq mi)
- OS grid reference: TQ195885
- London borough: Brent
- Ceremonial county: Greater London
- Region: London
- Country: England
- Sovereign state: United Kingdom
- Post town: LONDON
- Postcode district: NW9
- Dialling code: 020
- Police: Metropolitan
- Fire: London
- Ambulance: London
- UK Parliament: Brent West; Harrow East
- London Assembly: Brent and Harrow

Kingsbury is a district of northwest London in the London Borough of Brent. Its ancient scope stretches to include various distinct areas that were once small villages until the inter-war period. In 2001, Kingsbury was a ward, and in 2011 was approximately identifiable with the Fryent and Barnhill wards. Today, Kingsbury forms a quiet suburb between Fryent Country Park to the west and the Brent Reservoir to the east, along with a tube station of the same name and accompanying shopping district on the western side. The postal district is NW9, which it shares with Colindale and West Hendon.

== Etymology ==
The name Kingsbury means "The King's fortification".

== History ==
Kingsbury was an ancient parish of a fairly modest 6.9 square kilometres (2.7 sq mi) in the Hundred of Gore and county of Middlesex.

The early English kings had parted with their manor of Kingsbury long before the Conquest. An estate called Tunworth, in the northern part of Kingsbury parish, was granted by Edwy to his thegn Lyfing in 957. By 1066 it probably formed part of the manor of Kingsbury, which was then held by Wlward White, a thegn of the Confessor, and passed from him to Ernulf of Hesdin who died in 1097 and his lands passed to the family of Walter of Salisbury. Thereafter the overlordship of Kingsbury descended with Edgware manor. By 1086 on the Domesday survey of property, Ernulf's manor in Kingsbury had been subinfeudated to Albold as Lord. It was not mentioned again until 1317, when, under the name of the manor of Kingsbury, it belonged to Baldwin Poleyn of Tebworth.

Kingsbury developed little in housing and population in the 19th century, remaining a polyfocal village. In this age, Oliver Goldsmith, writer and playwright, lived at Hyde Farm, Kingsbury (1771–1774); the third Lord Mansfield was buried at St. Andrew's churchyard in 1840.

Although it lay close to London, development started slowly, and it was not until after the First World War that the district became built up. An aircraft industry was established in the part of Kingsbury adjacent to Hendon aerodrome during the war, while the road network was improved to cater for the British Empire Exhibition in nearby Wembley in 1924. The number of inhabited houses in the civil parish increased from just 140 in 1901 to 3,937 in 1931. By 1951 this had risen to 11,776. Between 1921 and 1931 Kingsbury's population increased by 796%.

Population growth meant the existing parish church, built in 1884, dedicated to the Holy Innocents, and adjacent to the more historic Old St Andrew's church, became too small. It was replaced during the 1930s. The current church, completed to designs by Samuel Daukes in 1847, had originally been constructed in Wells Street in central London but after its use declined it was deconstructed, transported and rebuilt (by Holland, Hannen & Cubitts, directed by architect William Adam Forsyth) in its entirety in Kingsbury in 1933–34.

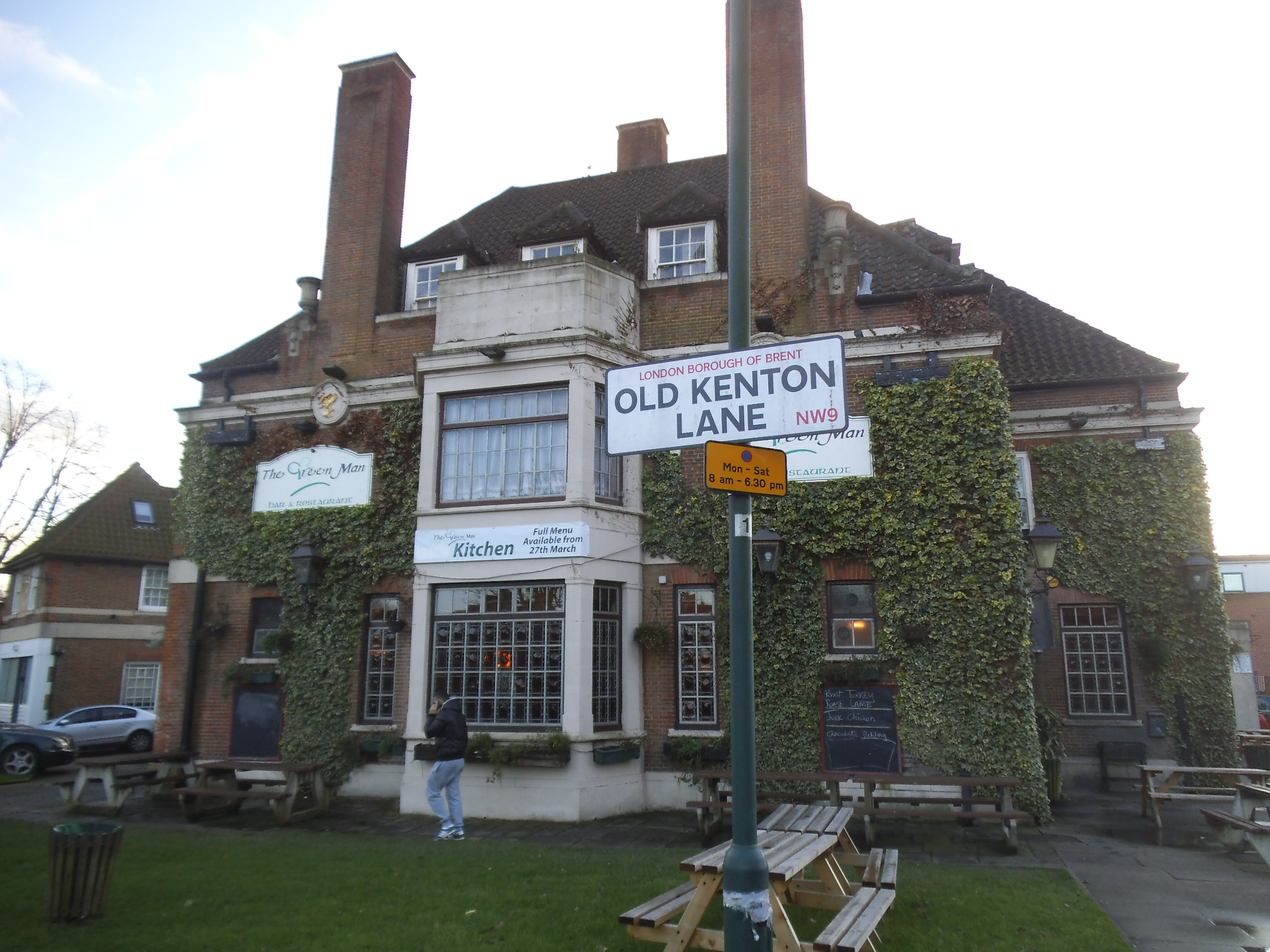
The Green Man pub, current building dating to 1930s

John Logie Baird's experimental television transmissions from the United Kingdom to Berlin, Germany were transmitted from the stable block of Kingsbury Manor; this later housed the Veterans Club, and is now a children's nursery.

From 1923 to 1979 Kingsbury Road was the location of the Vanden Plas specialist motor body works, body makers for Bentley and later part of Austin, BMC, and British Leyland. The site is now Kingsbury Trading Estate.

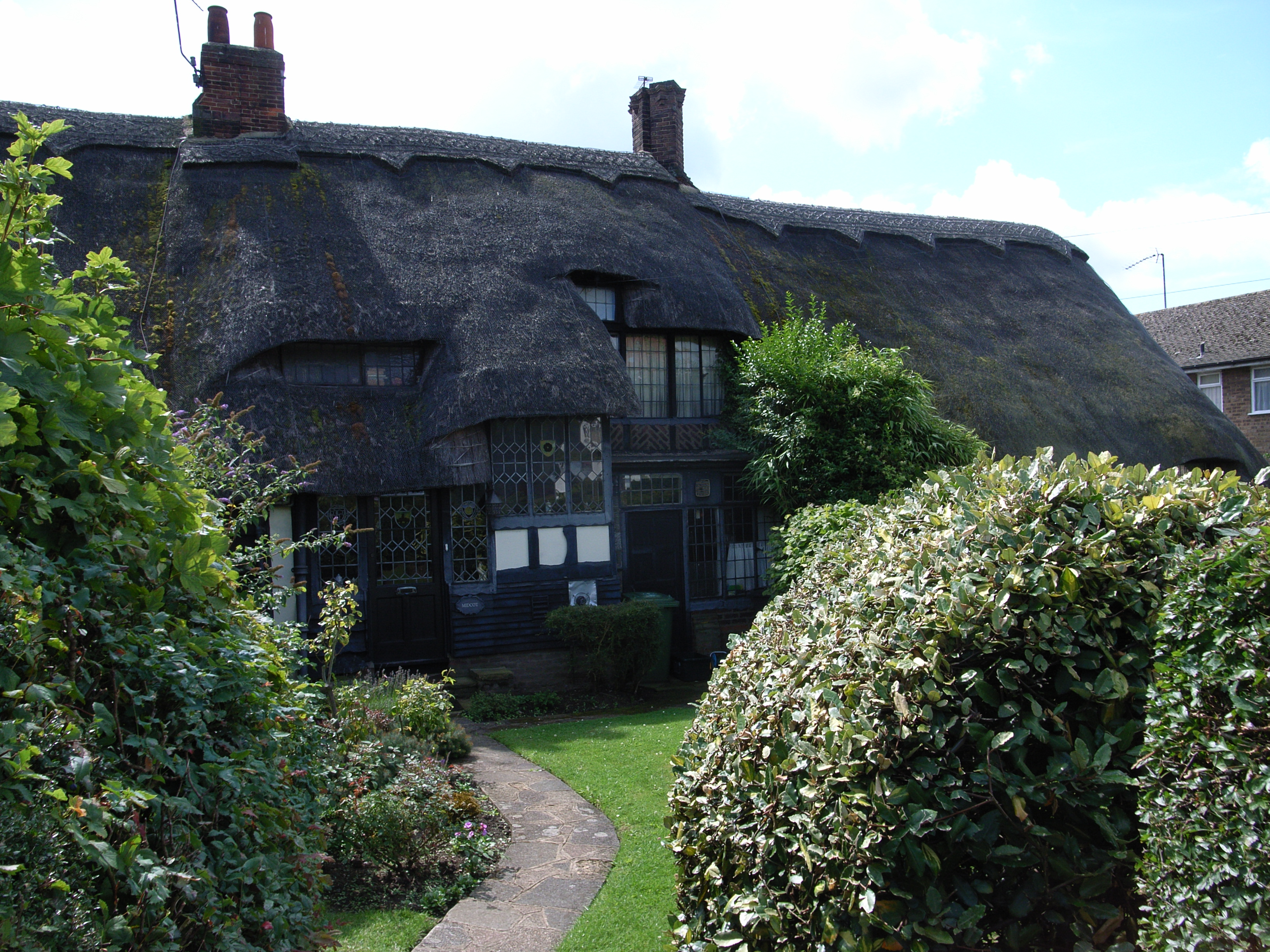
No. 154 Slough Lane, from the 1920s

A congregation of Jews affiliated to the United Synagogue is first recorded in Kingsbury in 1939. In 1942 Eden Lodge at Kingsbury Green was registered for worship, becoming Kingsbury district synagogue in 1954.

=== Local government ===
In 1894, the area of the medieval ancient parish of Kingsbury was included in the urban district of Wembley. However, as Kingsbury had only three councillors on the urban district council to Wembley's nine, Kingsbury's councillors felt the needs of the area were not well-served. In 1900 Kingsbury became a separate urban district with six councillors. The new council was immediately involved in controversy and in 1906 it failed to make a rate or meet its financial commitments. Following an inquiry initiated by ratepayers, the councillors numbered nine, not halting fiscal accusations directed towards the initial three councillors.

In 1934 the Kingsbury Urban District was abolished and merged once more in Wembley Urban District. On 1 April 1935 the civil parish was abolished and merged with Wembley. At the 1931 census (the last before the abolition of the parish), Kingsbury had a population of 16,636. The urban district became a municipal borough in 1937 and in 1965 the area became part of the London Borough of Brent.

Since 2022, Kingsbury is part of the Kingsbury ward for elections to Brent London Borough Council.

== Locale and amenities ==
=== Station area ===
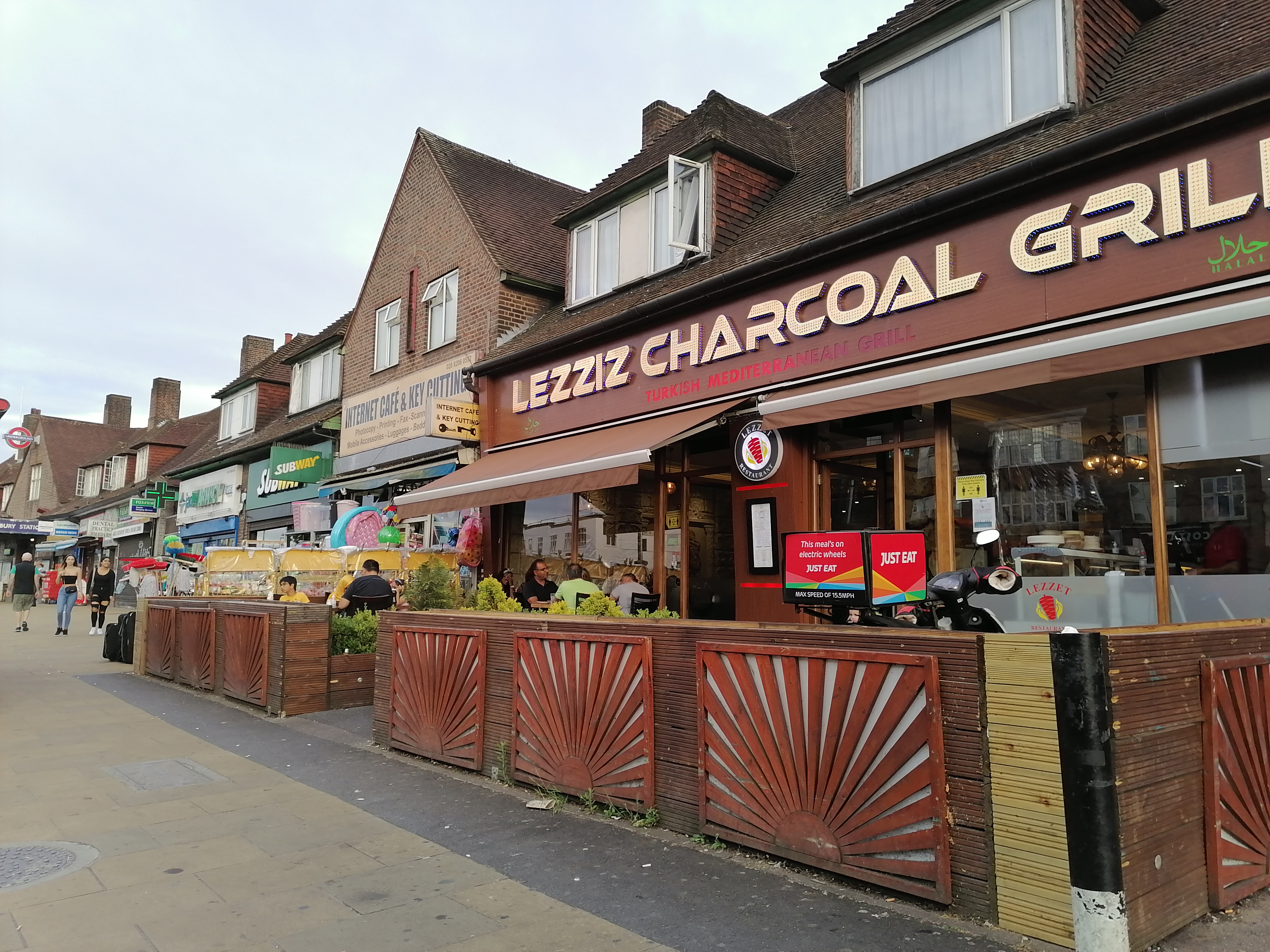
Shops and the tube station on Kingsbury Road

Kingsbury tube station on the Jubilee line is located in the western part of the district. This part of the road with an urban atmosphere contains supermarkets, banks, Arabic and Indian food and vegetable shops, and other businesses for the surrounding community. There is also a council-run library here. At its western end is Kingsbury Circle, a roundabout where roads leading to Wembley Park, Kenton & Harrow, and Queensbury & Stanmore along with Kingsbury Road meet.The surrounding area has places to dine.

This area remained agricultural until the Metropolitan Railway extension to Stanmore opening the station in 1932. This effectively caused further development in the station's vicinity and a new population centre for Kingsbury. The Kingsbury Odeon cinema opened in 1934 and existed until 1972 - today it is an Aldi supermarket. A public house called the Prince of Wales existed in front of the roundabout, which was demolished and replaced by a Tesco supermarket and flats in 2008.

=== Fryent Country Park ===
A major part of the district is the large Fryent Country Park which contains fields, woods, a fish pond, and a farm, and adjoins Barn Hill to the south.

=== Kingsbury Green and Fryent ===
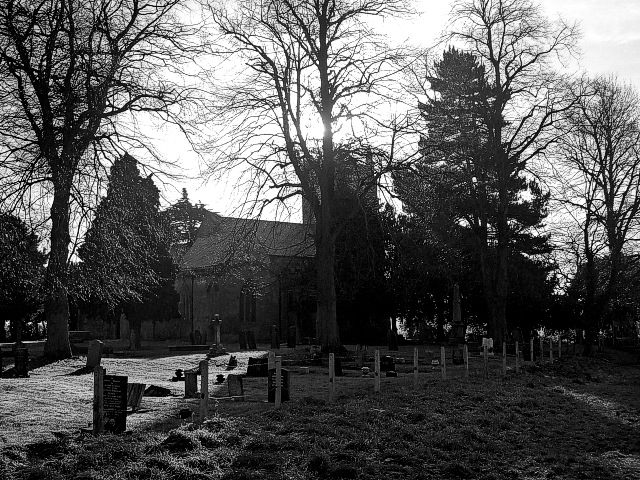
Grounds of St Andrew's church

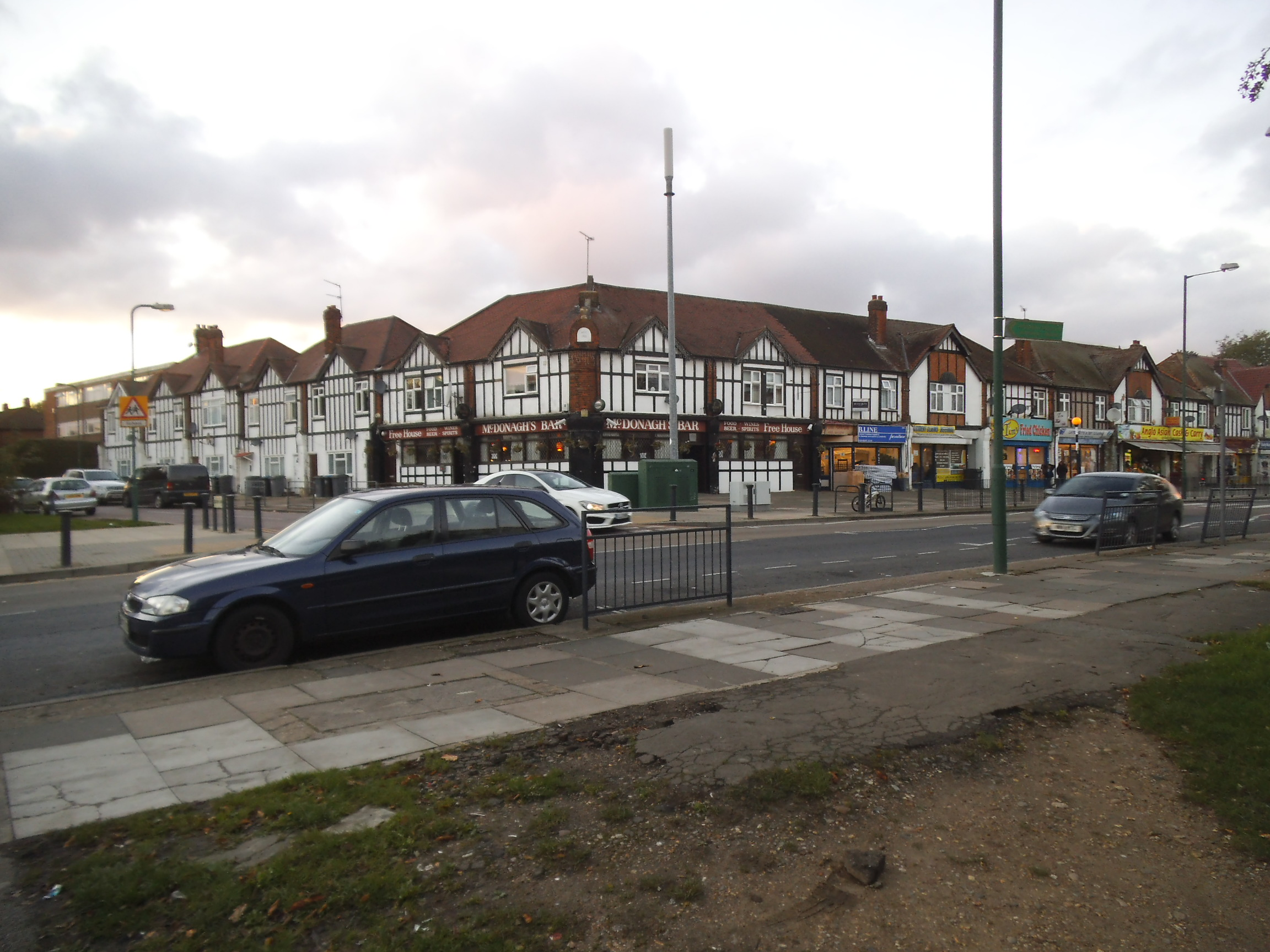
Church Lane/Slough Lane parade

The centre of Kingsbury Green which is today around the Kingsbury Road/Church Lane crossing was historically the centre of Kingsbury in the 15th century, built 1 mile north from the former settlement at Blackbird Hill. To its south, Church Lane leads to the St Andrew's parish church, built in 1933. In Slough Lane and Buck Lane there exist 1920s timbered houses designed by Ernest Trowbridge .

On the east side of the green is the Kingsbury Trading Estate, which formerly housed a United Dairies depot. This area was once an aerodrome run by the Barningham brothers under their company Kingsbury Aviation, until the 1920s. Afterwards the site was taken by Vanden Plas. The Kingsbury Works site continued manufacturing vehicles until it closed in 1979. On the west side of the green lies Kingsbury Synagogue.

Fryent (between Kingsbury Green and Blackbird Hill) meets the Welsh Harp to its east and has a road crossing the reservoir towards West Hendon. This part in the south retains traces of the district's quiet, wooded appearance.

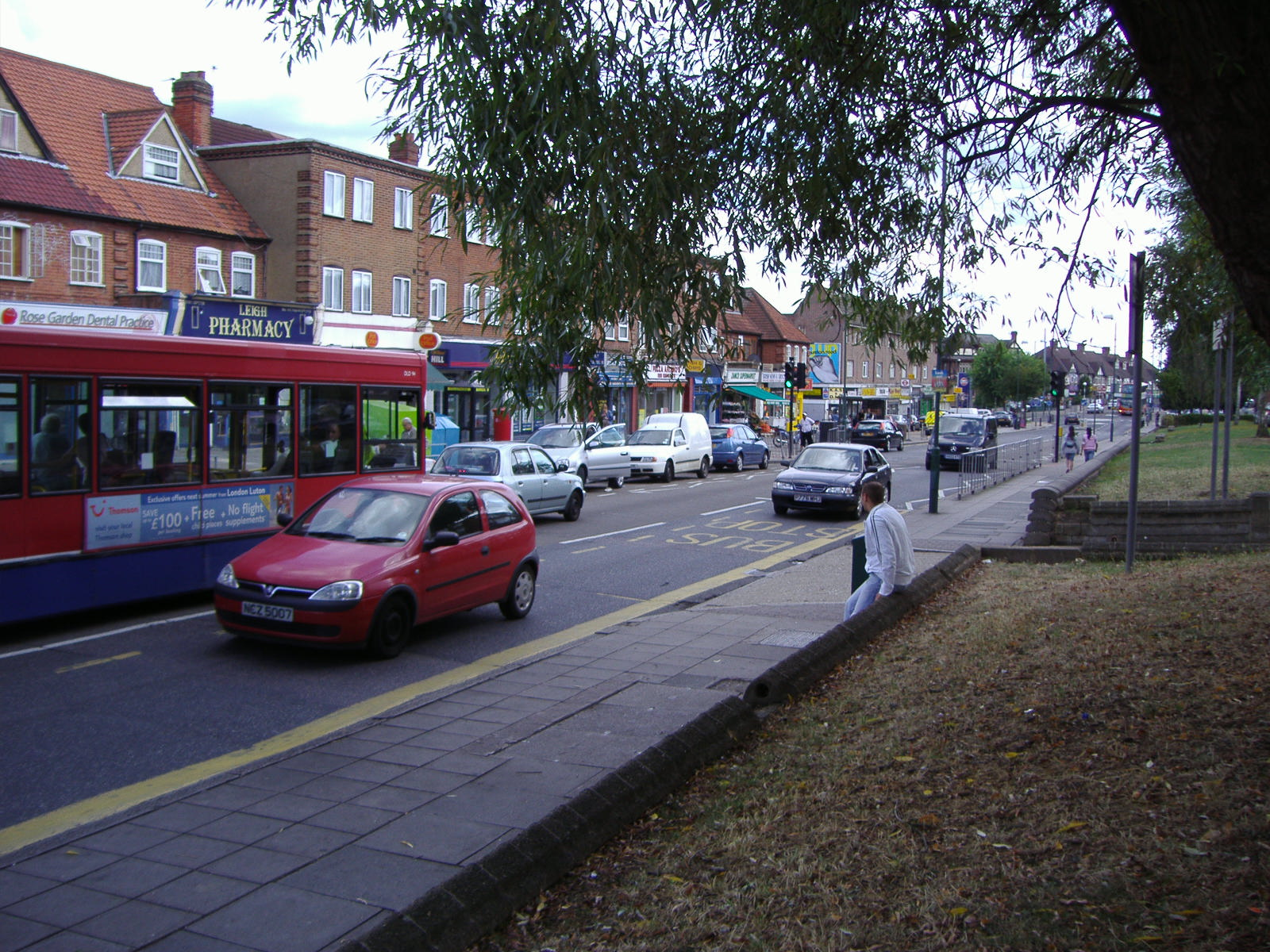
Church Lane, Kingsbury Green

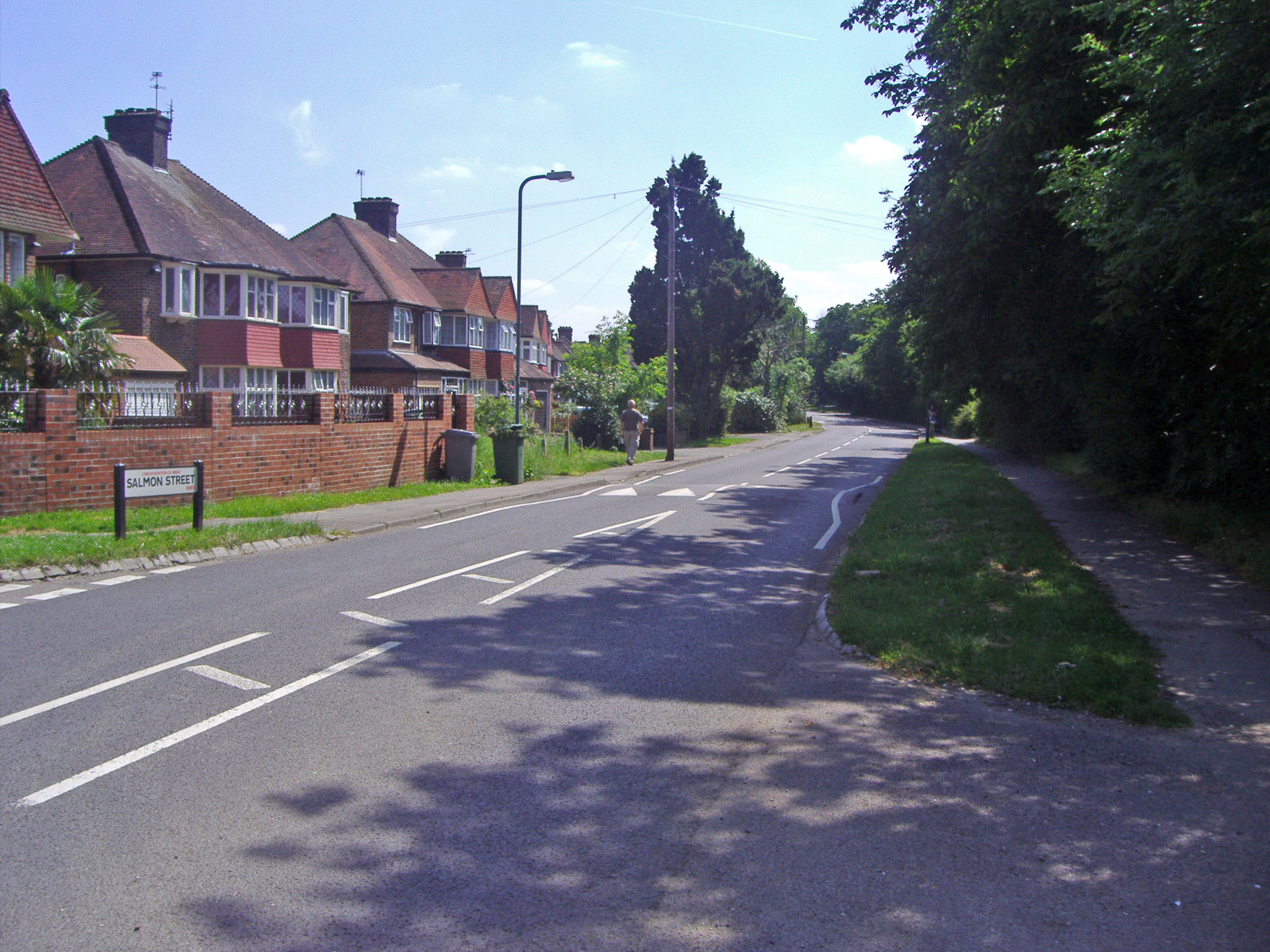
Salmon Street

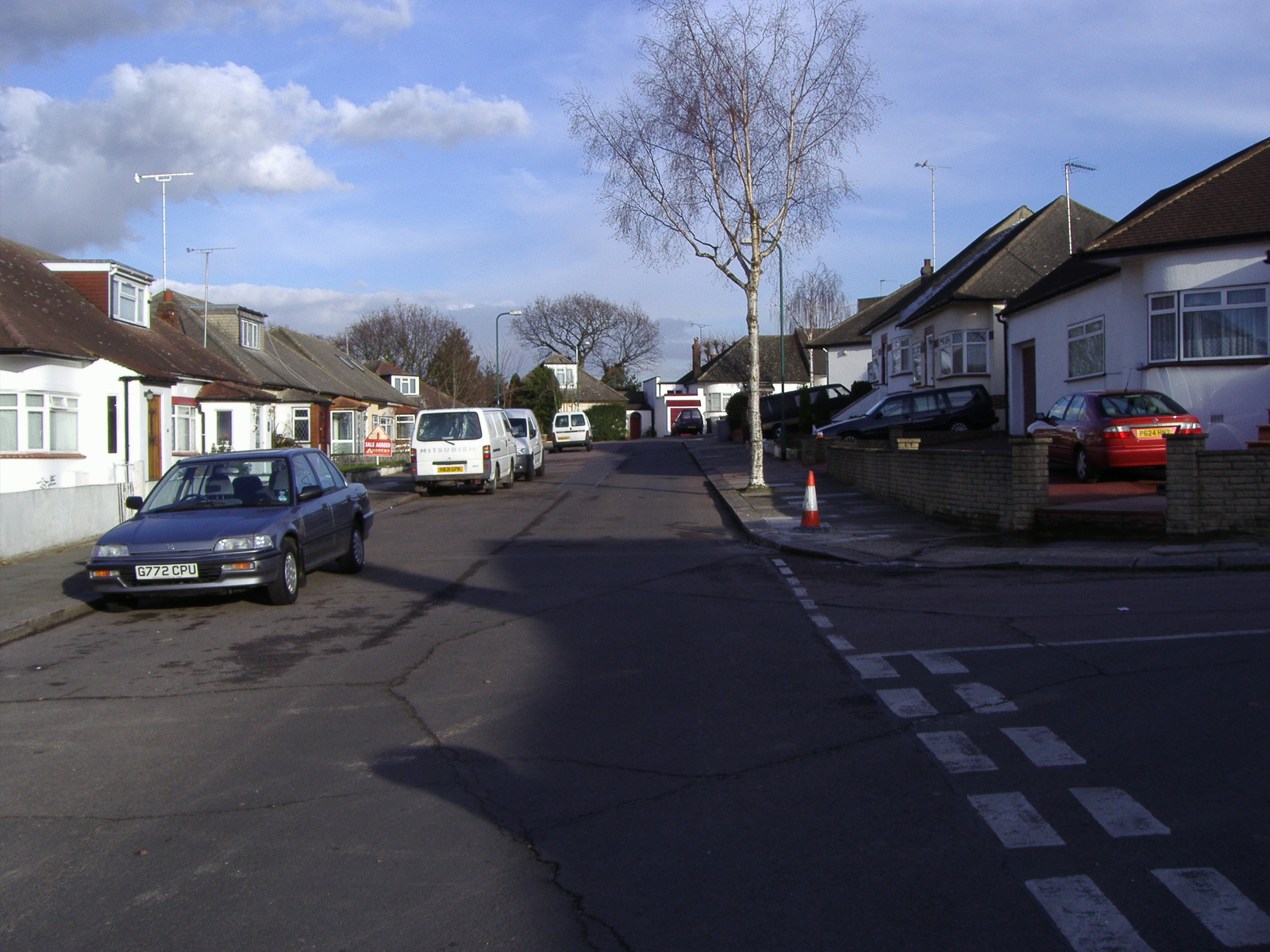
Kinloch Drive bungalows, Fryent

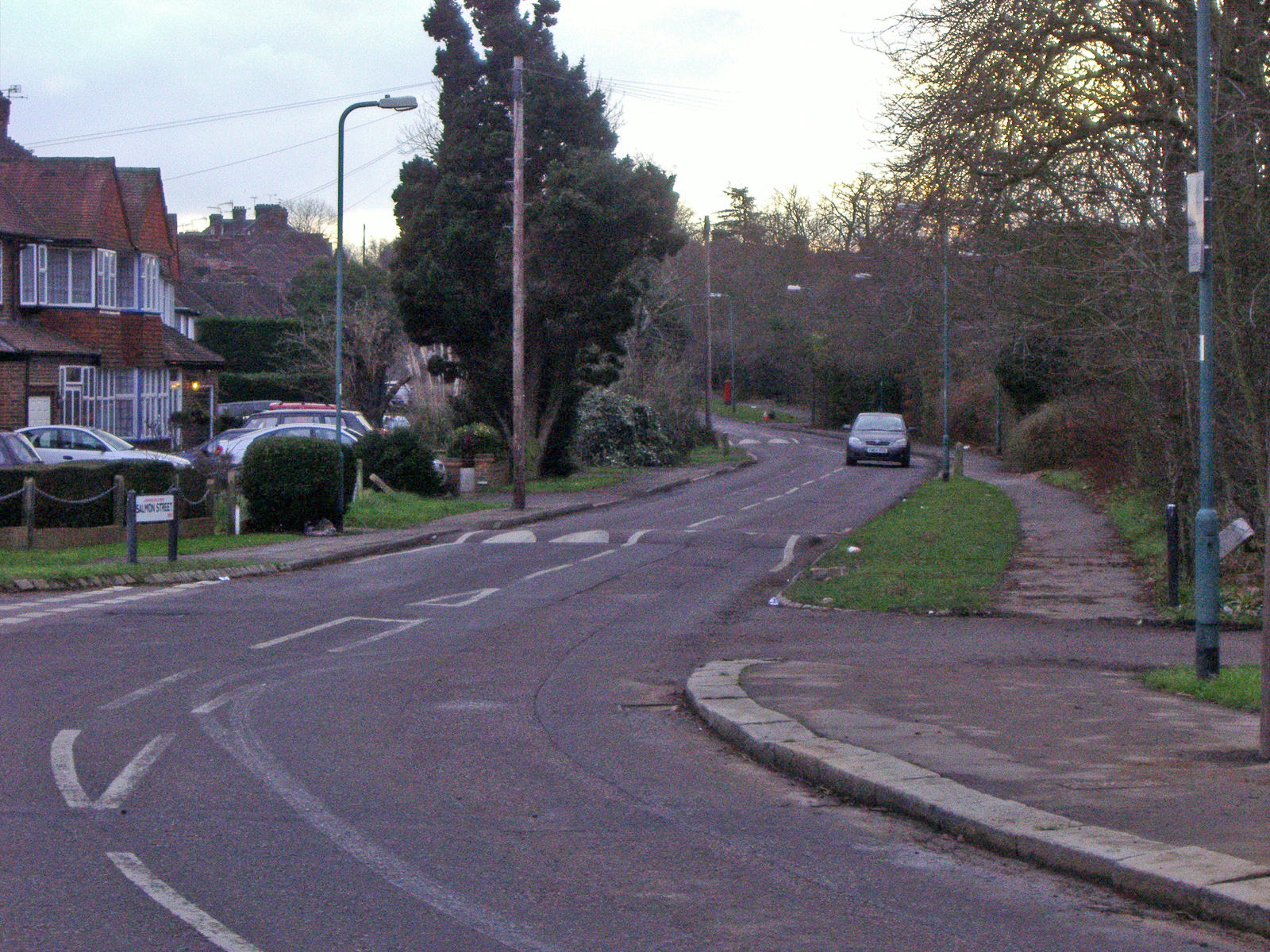
Salmon Street

=== Roe Green Village ===
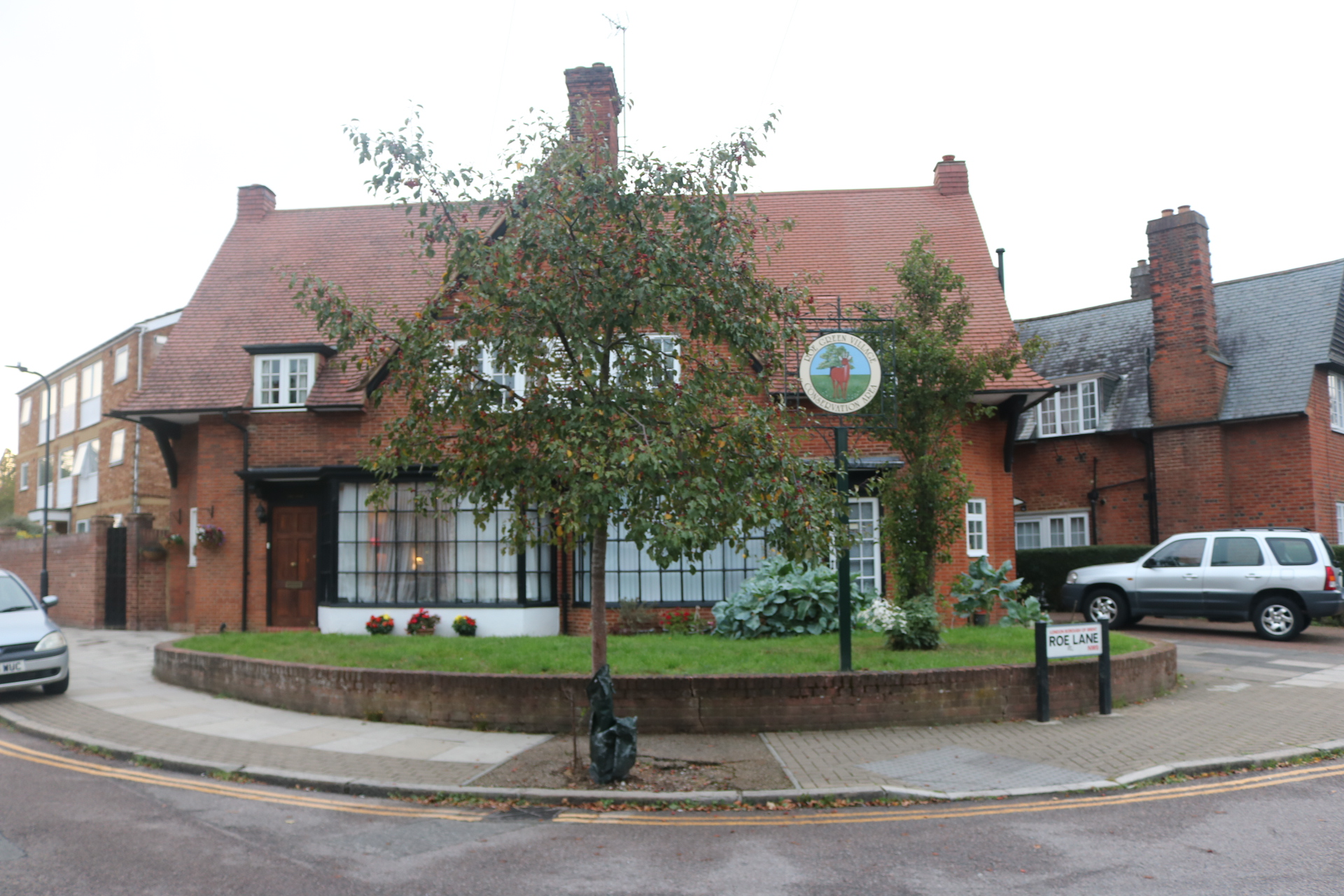
Roe Green Village

The Roe Green Garden Village is located to the east of Roe Green Park. In 1968 the area became a conservation area and it retains the atmosphere of a historic village green. The garden suburb estate was originally built during the First World War for workers at the nearby Aircraft Manufacturing Company. The rest of the area was opened up by the early 1930s.

The area is next to a previous medieval village called Roe Green, at the junctions of Stag Lane, Hay Lane and Bacon Lane, of which little remains.

The Kingsbury Manor in Roe Green Park, built in 1899, is today Grade II listed. Roe Green Park is community maintained by the Barnhill Conservation Group.

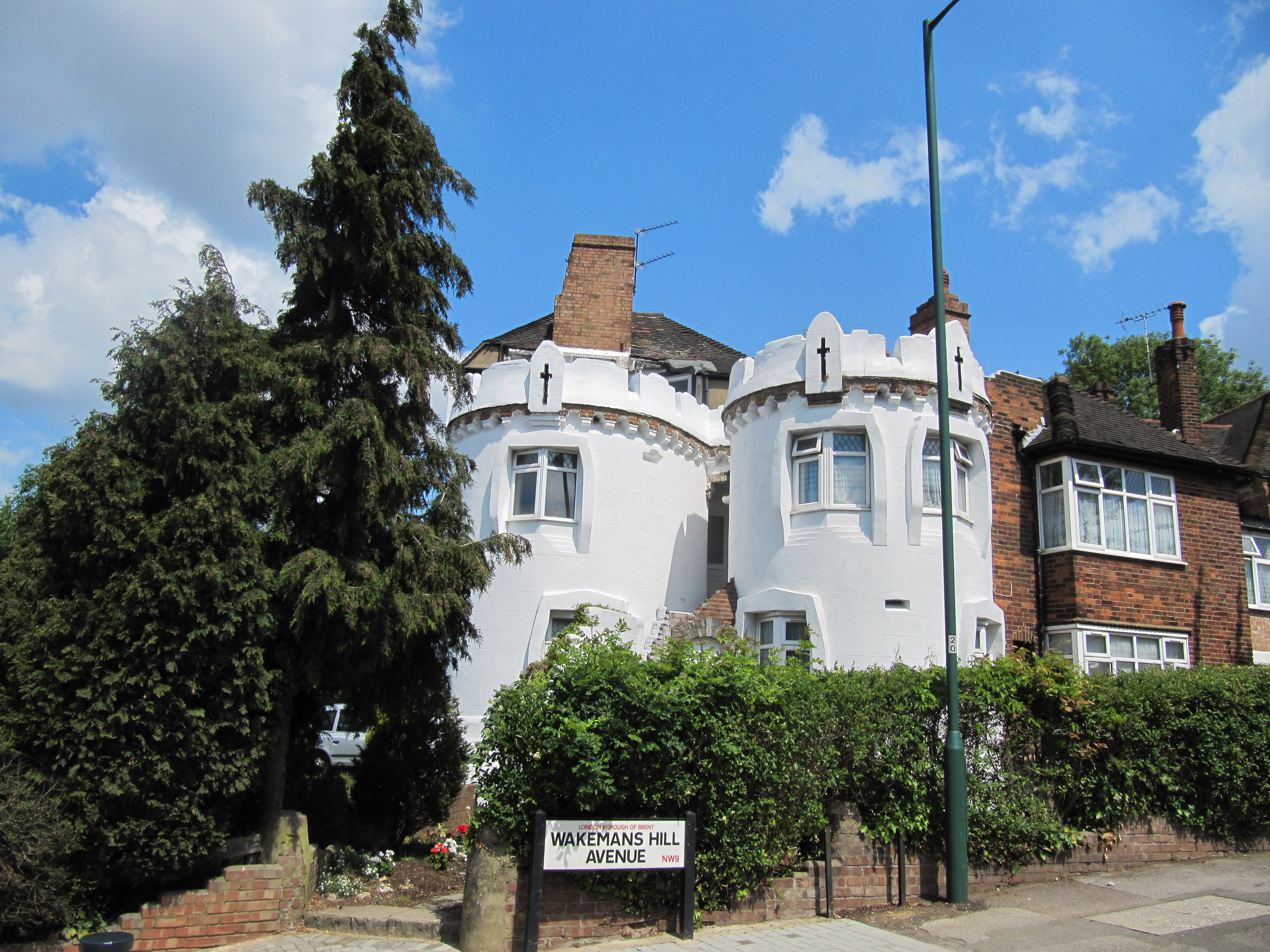
White Castle Mansions in Buck Lane

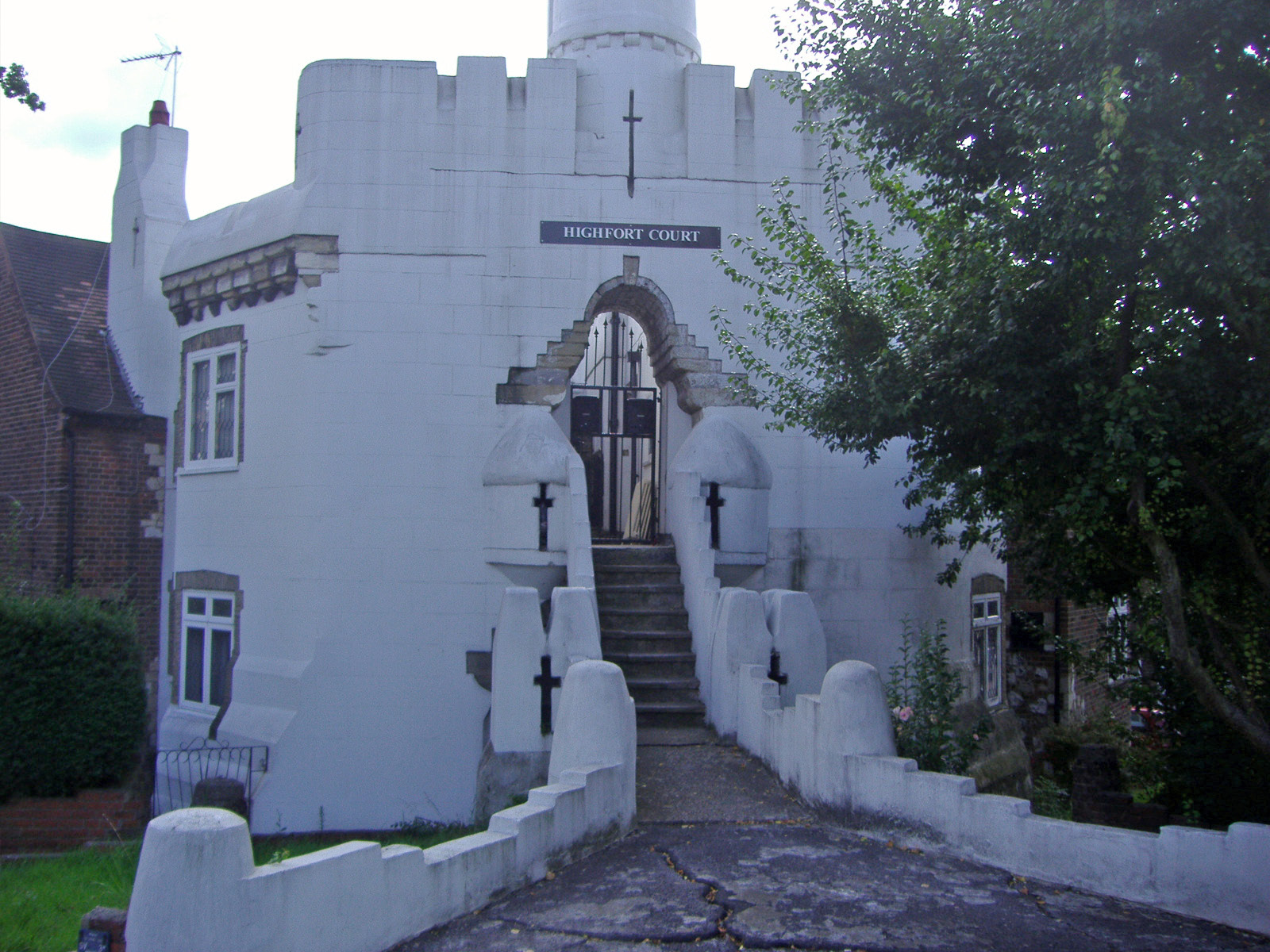
Highfort Court

=== Blackbird Hill ===
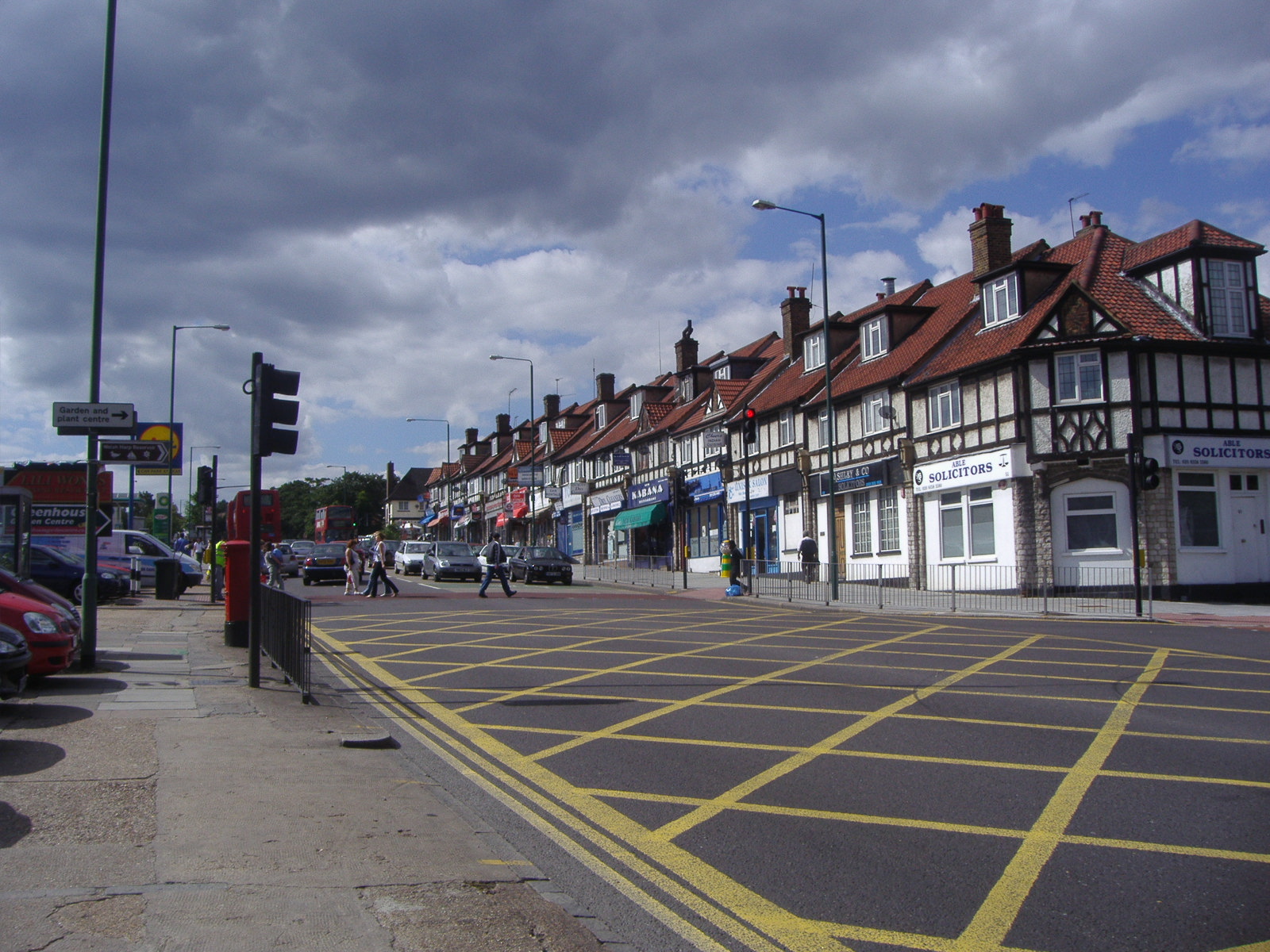
Blackbird Hill north side, which faces a Lidl supermarket and the Chalkhill Estate

Blackbird Hill is the ancient centre of Kingsbury which is today the very southern end of the district, separating west–east Wembley Park and Neasden. Today it is an important road that connects various suburbs in and around Kingsbury and Wembley to the North Circular Road. Little remains of the medieval village: the southern part was redeveloped into shops in the inter-war period, while the former farmhouse was demolished in the 1950s to make way for a public house, The Blackbird, later renamed Blarney Stone, which itself was demolished in 2011. The building of the old St Andrew's Church still exists on Old Church Lane.

Because of its location it is often referred to as being in Wembley Park or Neasden.

=== The Hyde ===
Holy Innocents church is located on Kingsbury Road, next to Oliver Goldsmith Primary School and opposite the Silver Jubilee Park. Next to the park is a large mandir complex including offices that opened in 2014 and combines Indian architecture with eco friendly technology. The community of the mandir moved over from a previous site located in Golders Green.

== Demography ==
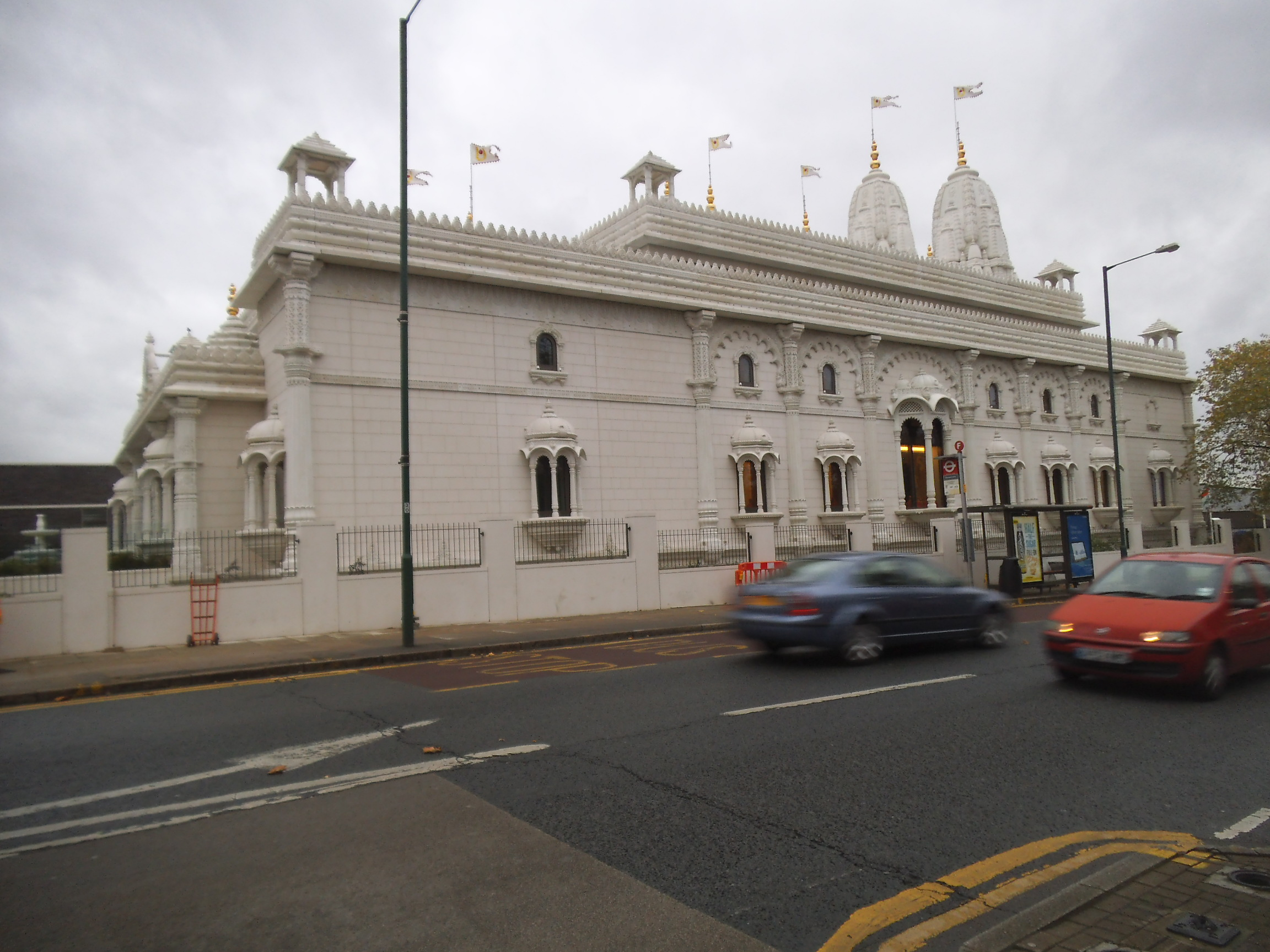
Kingsbury Hindu mandir

Kingsbury has large Asian and Irish communities. The local crime rate is average to below-average compared to London overall.

The 2011 census showed that the Fryent ward's largest ethnic group was Indian at 21%. Whites as a whole form 34% (20% Black Caribbean, 14% Other, 6% Black African). 11% was Other Asian. 41% were Christian, 21% Muslim and 20% Hindu. The Welsh Harp ward, which covers southern areas of Kingsbury Green, was 17% White Other, 17% Indian, and 16% White British.

== In film, literature and music ==
The first two series of BBC children's drama Grange Hill were filmed at Kingsbury High School. Video of "Round Here", about George Michael's childhood, features Roe Green Park, Roe Green Primary School and other local landmarks.

== Notable people ==
- Charlie Watts, drummer of The Rolling Stones, was raised in Kingsbury.
- John Beard (trade unionist), had his last home in 27 Wyndale Avenue at the time of his death in 1950.
- George Michael, singer and songwriter, was raised in Kingsbury.
- Stuart Pearce, English former professional football manager and player, raised in Kingsbury.
- Tony Kanal, bassist of No Doubt, was born and raised in Kingsbury.
- Audley Harrison, British heavyweight boxer grew up in Kingsbury.
- Courtney Pine, jazz musician, was raised in Kingsbury from age 14.
- Julie Rogers, singer, was educated and lived in Kingsbury.
- James Hanratty, among last condemned to hang for murder, lived in Kingsbury.
- Shirley Eaton, actress.
- Celia Fremlin, crime novelist.
- Chris Squire, bassist of Yes and The Syn, was born in Kingsbury.
- Steve Nardelli, guitarist and vocalist with The Syn, went to Kingsbury County Grammar School.
- Mutya Buena and Keisha Buchanan, singer/songwriters, Sugababes, born and raised in Kingsbury.
- Mick Tucker, drummer of Sweet, was born in Kingsbury
- Jet Harris, musician with Tony Meehan and The Shadows, was born in Kingsbury.
- Gary Waddock, former Wycombe Wanderers manager, was born in Kingsbury.
- Jasmyn Banks, actress, was educated in Kingsbury.
- Brian Michaels, theatre and opera director, was born and raised in Kingsbury.
- Lorraine Silver, English singer known for her single "Lost Summer Love" (1965), went to Oliver Goldsmith Primary School.

== Geography ==
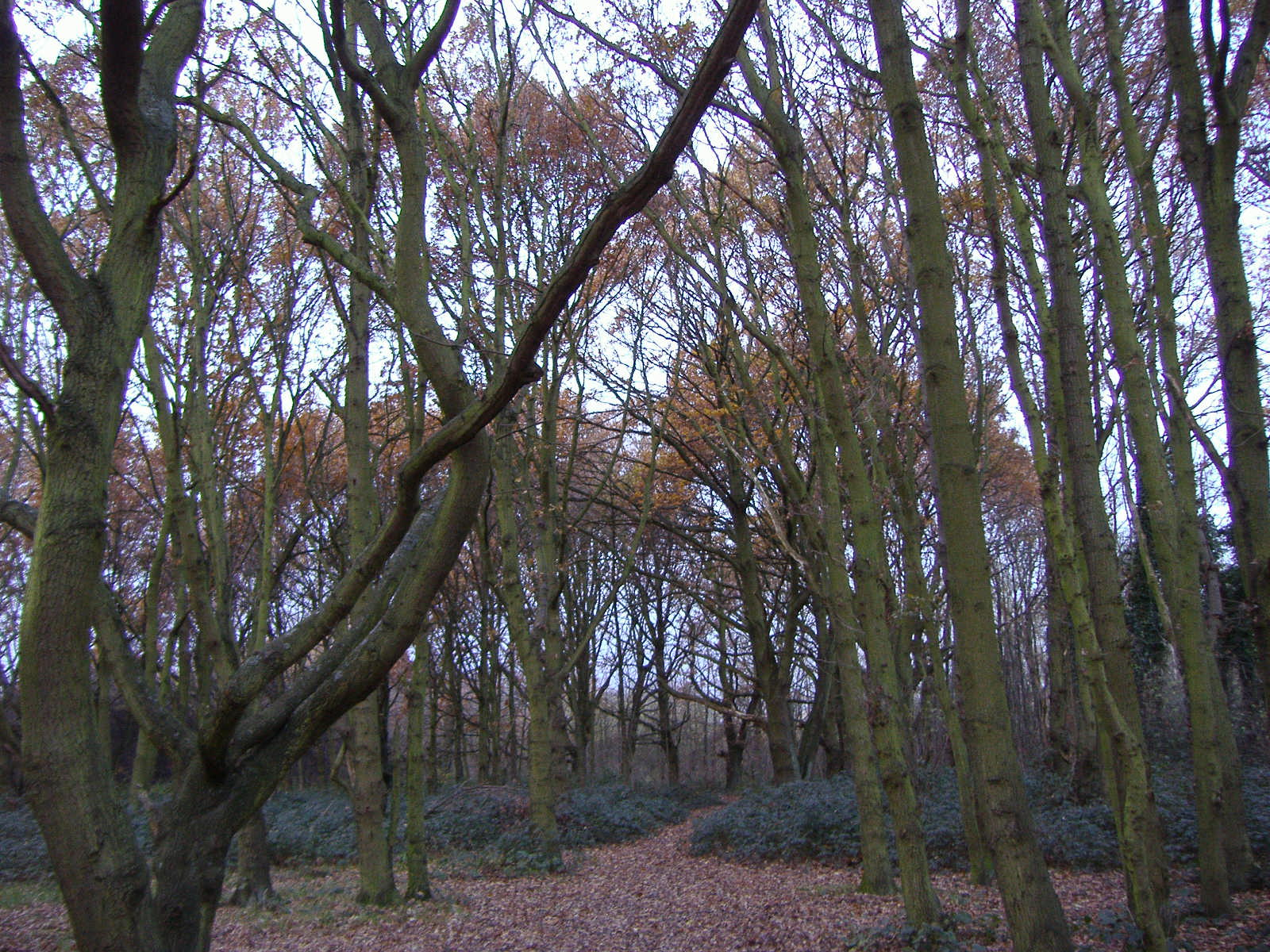
Woods by the Welsh Harp

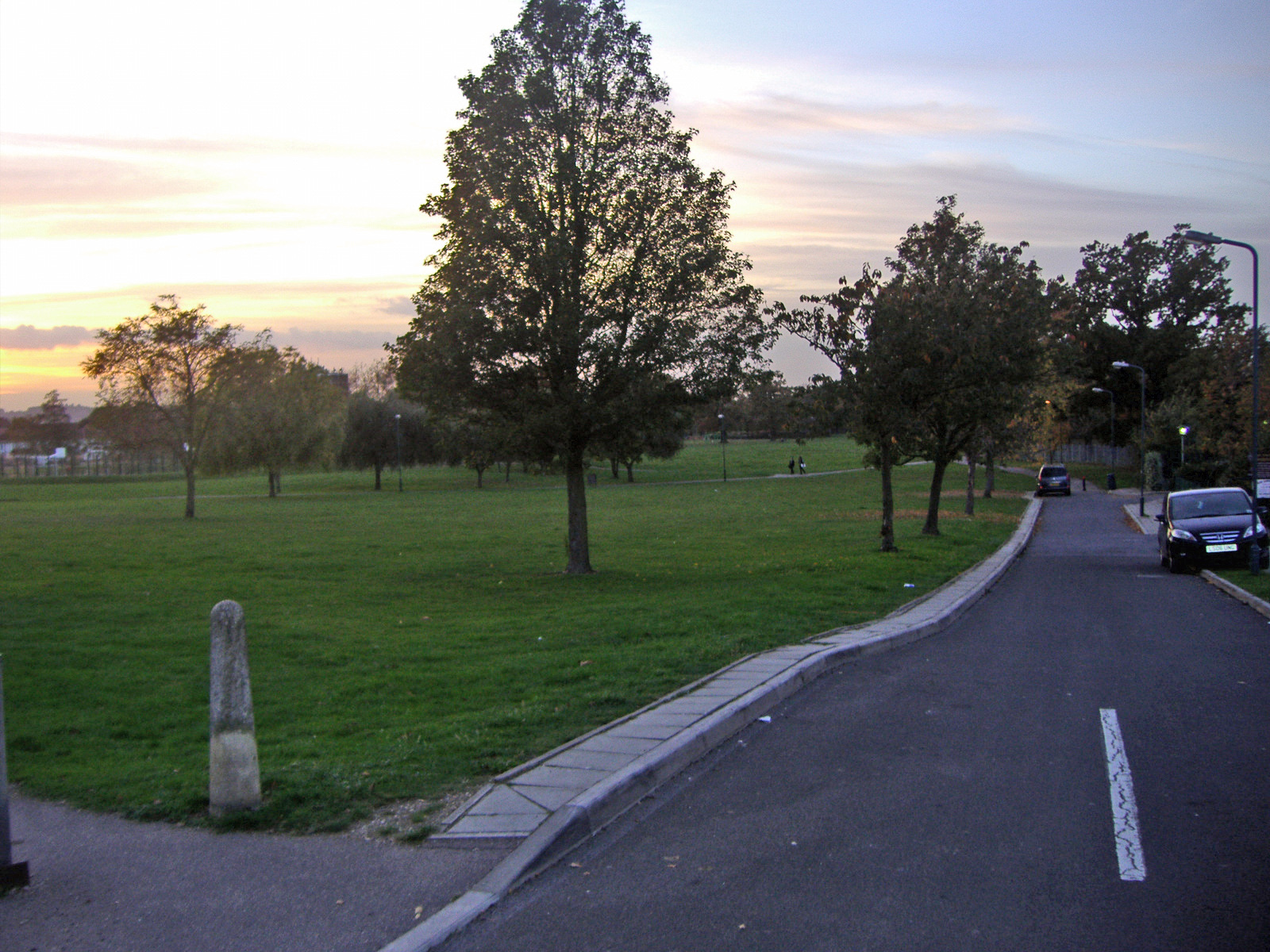
Roe Green Park

Much of Kingsbury lies between 148 feet (45 m) and 200 feet (60 m) above sea level. A part at the foot of Fryent Country Park peaks at 213 feet (65 m) and the northern tip of Silver Jubilee Park peaks at an elevation of 233 feet (71 m). Roe Green Garden Village is particularly steep; the area here peaks at an elevation of 302 feet (92 m) near the crossing of Buck Lane and Wakemans Hill Avenue.

== Transport ==
=== Roads ===
Kingsbury Road A4006 is the largest road within the district. Fryent Way A4140 cuts through the country park and its southern section is Salmon Street. Church Lane (and Tudor Gardens) is the other main road. The A5 Edgware Road lies closely to the east and the A406 North Circular Road is also nearby to the south-east.

=== Buses ===
London Buses serving Kingsbury are:

Route	Start	End	Operator
79	Alperton Sainsbury's	Edgware	Metroline
83	Alperton	Golders Green	Metroline
183	Pinner	Golders Green	London Sovereign
204	Sudbury	Edgware	Metroline
302	Mill Hill Broadway	Kensal Rise	Metroline
303	Kingsbury Circle	Edgware	London Sovereign
324	Brent Cross Tesco	Stanmore	London Sovereign
628	Southgate	Kingsbury JFS	Sullivan Buses
653	Muswell Hill	Kingsbury JFS	Sullivan Buses
683	Friern Barnet	Kingsbury JFS	Sullivan Buses
688	Southgate	Kingsbury JFS	Sullivan Buses
N83	Ealing Hospital	Golders Green	Metroline
N98	Holborn	Stanmore	Metroline

=== Tube ===
Stations in the area are:

- Kingsbury Station (Jubilee line)

== Local parks ==
- Barn Hill Open Space
- Fryent Country Park
- Kingsbury Green Recreation Ground
- Roe Green Park
- Silver Jubilee Park
- Grove Park Open Space
- Eton Grove Park

== Schools ==
- Kingsbury High School
- Jewish Free School (JFS)
- Fryent Primary School
- Oliver Goldsmith Primary School
- Kingsbury Green Primary School
- Roe Green Primary School
- St Robert Southwell Primary School

== See also ==
- Old St Andrew's Church, Kingsbury
- Kingsbury Aviation
