= X. australis =

X. australis may refer to:

- Xanthorrhoea australis, the grass-tree or black boy, a plant species found in Australia
- Xenorma australis, a moth species in the genus Xenorma
- Xerula australis, a gilled mushroom species

== See also ==
- Australis (disambiguation)
