= Joseph Cachia Caruana =

Maltese architect (1894–1981)

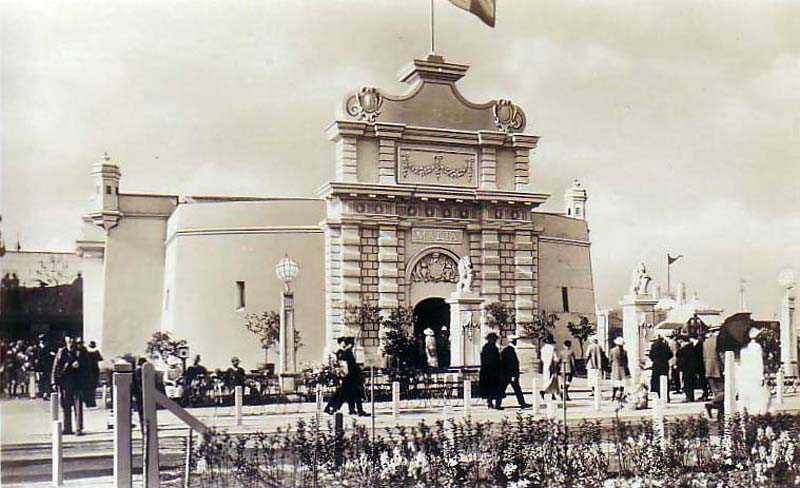
Malta's pavilion at the 1924 British Empire Exhibition at Wembley

Joseph Cachia Caruana (Italian: Giuseppe Cachia Caruana; 1894–1981) was a Maltese architect active in the Sliema area.

A relative of the able perito and patriot Michele Cachia (1760–1839), Cachia Caruana stemmed from a family of architects that included Architetto Gio Domenico Cachia, Capomaestro della Opere (d. 1761); Architetto Antonio Cachia, Capomaestro della Opere (1738–1813); Architetto Salvatore Cachia, (1774–1813), dunm.; and his father Architetto Giuseppe Antonio Cachia Caruana.

In 1924, Cachia Caruana designed the Malta's pavilion for the British Empire Exhibition at Wembley, together with Alberto La Ferla. According to Giovanni Bonello, he "conceived the edifice as a walled fortress, to which access was gained through a full-scale replica of Mdina gate. Three large halls made up the interior space; one for Malta's prehistory, another for the island under the Knights and finally one for contemporary industry, trade and art". The pavilion was well received at the time, although Mark G. Muscat assesses it as "an agglomeration of past references that were all crammed into a single exhibit".

In the 1930s, Cachia Caruana designed several terraced houses in high-demand Sliema addresses such as Victoria Junction, Dingli Street and Tower Road. He was commissioned large-scale projects such as Rohan Apartments with its medieval Maltese motifs near the summit of Savoy Hill and the exquisite Ramel Buildings (100 Isouard Street / 243A Tower Road).

According to Edward Said, "his style is clearly eclectic, incorporating the vernacular, colonial and hints of Art Deco yet generally attaining an unpresumptuous syntax". Cachia Caruana "practically disregarded Art Nouveau, preferring to use vernacular classicism in his many residential projects."
