= Eady Hart =

(1848-1931) dye maker

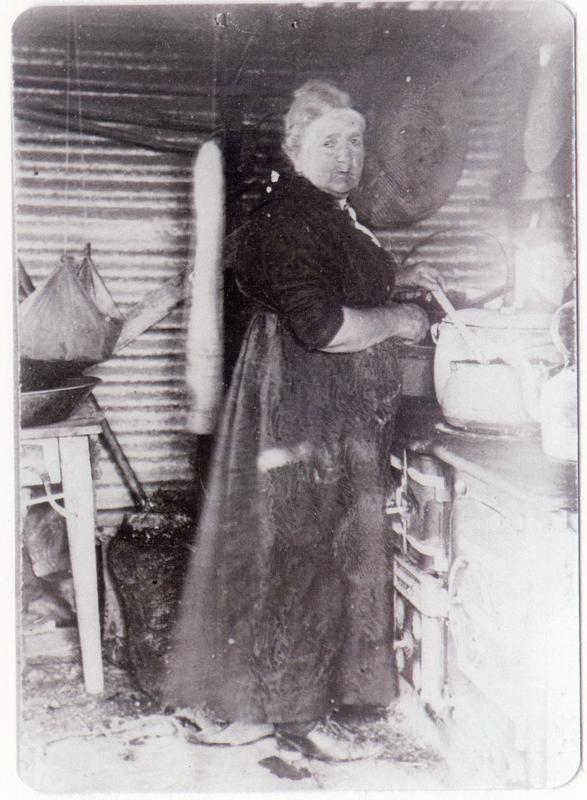
Hart dyeing fabrics, c. 1925

Eady Hart (née Booth, 28 December 1848 – 28 February 1931) was an English-born Australian inventor and dye maker who developed a series of natural dyes marketed as Hart's Royal Dyes. She patented her dyeing processes in Australia and overseas and founded Hart's Australian Dyes in Ballarat, Victoria.

== Early life ==
Hart was born on 28 December 1848 at Wolverhampton, England. She was the second-born of twin daughters of Isaac Booth and his wife Catherine Elvin (née Rainals). Hart's paternal grandfather Isaac Booth Snr. was a governor of the Bank of England. During the Victorian gold rush the Booth family migrated to Victoria. Although the exact vessel is unknown, it has been suggested that they arrived aboard the Francis Henty in May 1854.

Upon arrival in Australia Hart settled in Ballarat and she began working as a dressmaker. On 14 December 1876 at Wycliff Church of England, Learmonth, she married English-born William Hart, who was later an engineer with the Ballarat Gas Co. They had eight children together, four sons and four daughters. William later deserted the family, leaving Hart to support herself and their children. Hart augmented her pension with sewing and millinery, along with fostering four girls and two boys.

== Dye experimenting ==
Hart initially experimented with products derived from native Australian plants. She manufactured firelighters from the pulverised trunks of grass trees (Xanthorrhoea australis), which her children sold in packs of twelve. But she found great success formulating natural dyes. Hart discovered that boiling grass trees with washing soda and lime produced a brilliant golden dye, leading her to investigate other natural dyes. From 1914 to 1919 Hart struggled with patenting her natural dye processes, along with supporters foiling attempts to form a company. Despite this Hart perfected the dyes in her home kitchen and in December 1921 mounted a public display of her natural dye works.

Hart mortgaged her house, formed a syndicate and built a laboratory at Canadian Gully to begin production and Hart's Australian Dyes was incorporated late in 1921. A surge in demand for shares followed after a display in 1922 of fabrics colours in more natural hues likened to what you could see in a garden when compared to those of her rivals and a factory was later built on Mair Street, Ballarat.

Articles in Work and Energy (England) and the London Daily Express attracted entrepreneurial attention, and Hart had successfully achieved patents for her dyes in Australia, England, India and the United States of America in 1925 after her initial patent application in 1919. However, despite Hart’s technical success and the two bronze medals won at the British Empire Exhibition 1924 and Great Wembley Exhibition in 1925 the company failed.

== Death ==
Hart died aged 82 on 28 February 1931 at Ballarat District Hospital and was buried in the new Ballarat cemetery alongside her mother and twin sister Harriet on 2 March 1931, she was survived by her eight children and six foster children.

The two bronze medals won at the British Empire Exhibition and Great Wembley Exhibition were bequeathed to the Ballarat Fine Art Gallery.
