= Alberto Laferla =

Maltese architect (1898–1942)

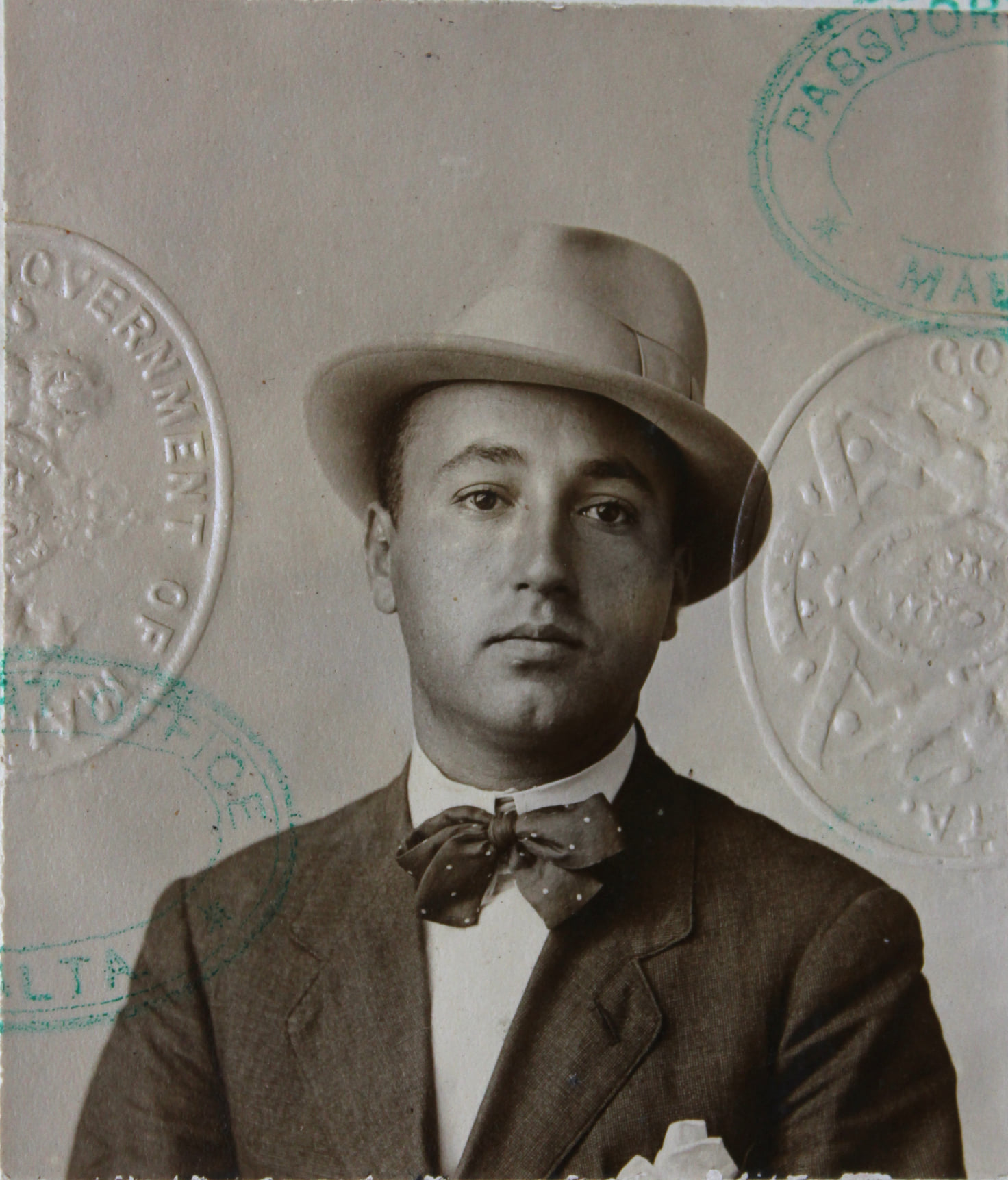
Laferla circa 1930

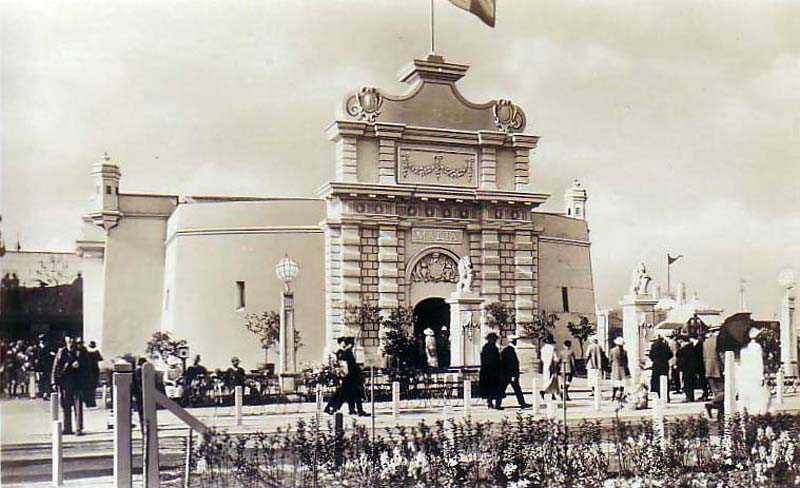
Malta's pavilion at the 1924 British Empire Exhibition at Wembley

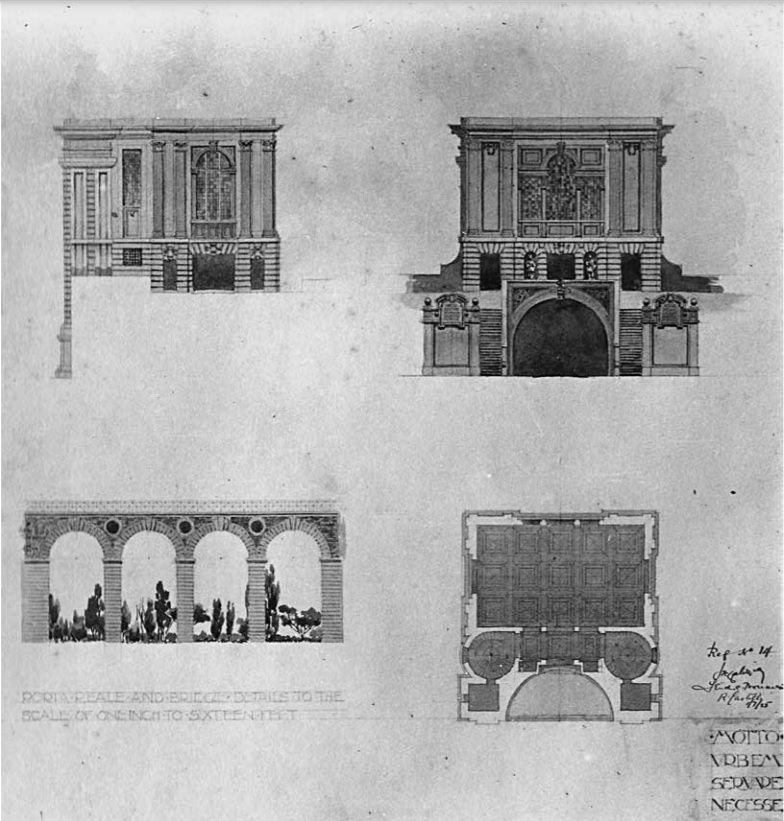
Details of Alberto Laferla's submission for the Valletta Lay-Out Competition, 1924

Alberto Laferla (1898–1942) was a Maltese architect, active in the 1920s and 1930s.

Laferla graduated in architecture from the University of Malta and continued his studies in Turin. As he deemed Art Nouveau to be a decadent style, he aimed to detach himself from any reference to it. He rather adhered to the new Italian architectural fashion: monumentalism and Stile Littorio.

After graduating, Laferla worked in the architectural studio of Enrico Del Debbio in Rome, architect of the Stadio dei Marmi and Foro Mussolini.

In 1924, he designed the Malta's pavilion for the British Empire Exhibition at Wembley, together with G. Caruana. The pavilion was well received at the time, although Mark G. Muscat assesses it as "an agglomeration of past references that were all crammed into a single exhibit".

The same year, Laferla took part in the Valletta Lay-Out Competition, being the only Maltese architect receiving an honourable mention. Laferla suggested to demolish the Third Valletta City Gate to replace it with a wider one, "masculine and stern" (“maschia e severa”), in line with the surrounding bastions, to "recall the achievements of the Great Siege and immortalise in stone and marble the glorious Order of the Knights of Malta". He claimed to be inspired in his design by Bramante’s Belvedere in the Vatican Gardens. Laferla also suggested a design for the façade fronting Strada Reale to harmonize with the Royal Opera House and Palazzo Buttigieg-Francia, as well as two tunnel entrances to Valletta, one in line with Strada Forni under Saint James Cavalier, the other in line with Strada Mercanti under Saint John's Cavalier.

Laferla practiced in Malta in the 1930s. He authored Casa Beatrice, Sliema, and Cactus House in Triq Manwel Dimech, Sliema (1931), in which he "put classicist order aside, in favour of a forced monumentalism", as stated by Mark G. Muscat:

"The façade is designed with the aim of making the two-storeyed terraced house look grand and imposing. It could be noted that the various references to cactus and palm trees in the ironwork are an illusion to the Italian war victories in Africa at the time the house was being built. The oversize columns support a concrete balcony, which Laferla used frequently in his townhouses; this offered the advantage of omitting the central console bracket. Laferla's patterns are comparable to the simplified classical forms used in Stile Littorio buildings throughout Italy. It is not possible to perceive to what extent the client was aware of the undertones of Laferla's influence of the Stile Littorio, although it was popular in Italy at the time."

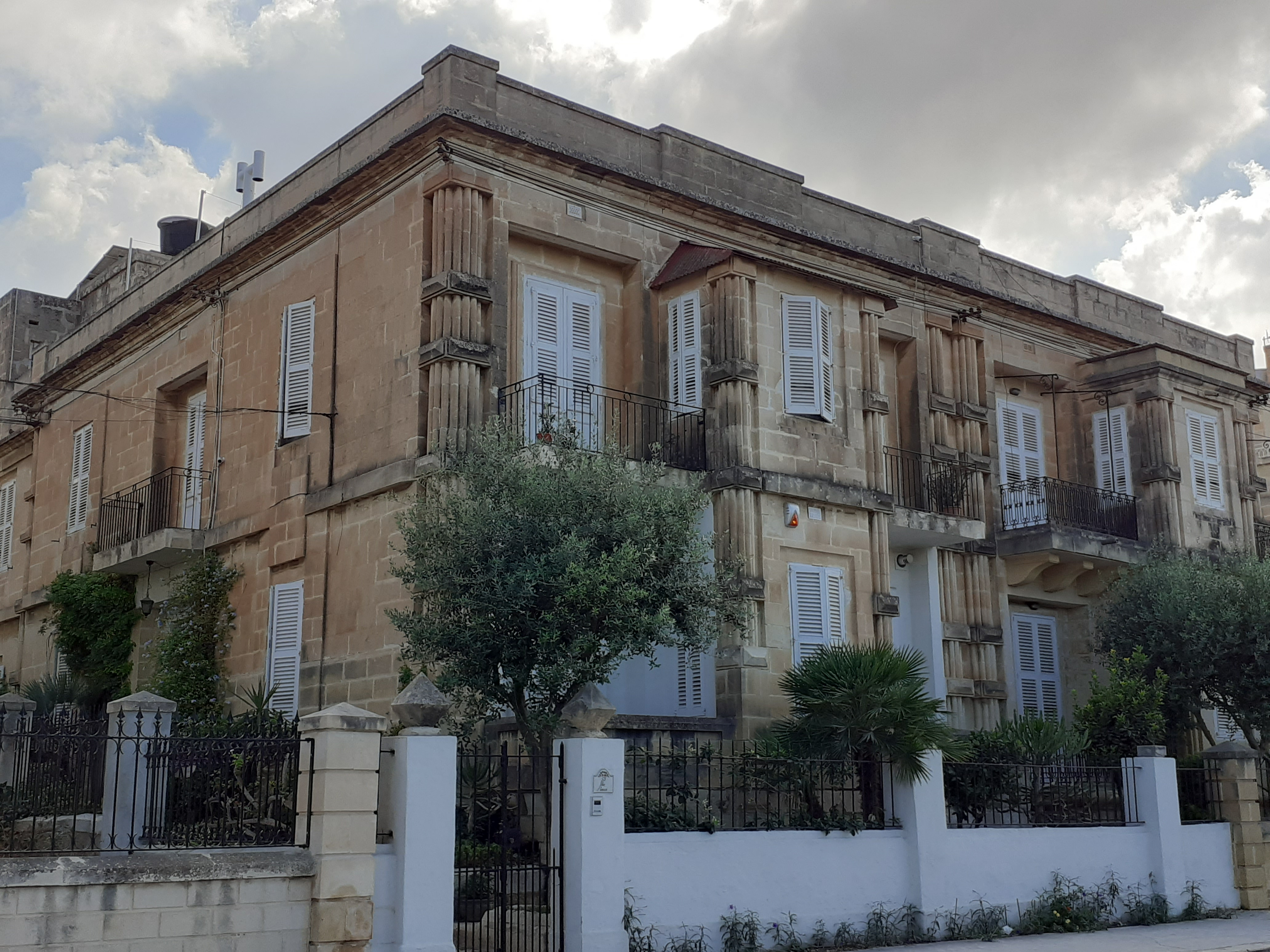
Villa Gloria in Ta' Xbiex, in Stile Littorio

Laferla also designed a Casa del Fascio for Marsaxlokk, with "conspicuous Fascist architectural connotations" (never built) as well as Villa Gloria in Ta' Xbiex, in which it is possible to see the elements of Stile Littorio:

"Villa Gloria in Ta' Xbiex also manifests influence of the Stile Littorio idiom. From a distance the villa looks much like the other villas surrounding it. However, a closer and critical inspection reveals an astute illusion. The columns along the façade are similar to a fascio... Having been built in the 1930s it is at least tempting to consider the possibility that the fascio was not an accidental inclusion, but an intentional design element of these peculiar columns."

According to Edward Said, Laferla

"paid special attention to the design of the apertures and wrought iron fittings employing motifs such as the shield-panels on doors and balconies, as well as railings with basic spiralling, which were features of the balcony railings and main door fanlight. These can be seen on a number of his facades along Amery, Milner, Howard and Dingli Streets [in Sliema]. He cleverly succeeded in striking symmetry to single-fronted houses as can be seen in his Milner Street and Prince of Wales Road (today Manwel Dimech Street) terraced residences. He also designed the ‘Warrior’ building in Old College Street, built for a Maltese Royal Navy seaman who served on a ship by that name. He also designed ‘Cactus house’ which is situated near the Old College Street bridge crossing Prince of Wales Road up from Balluta, adopting a rectilinear style façade with pillar and symbolic design of the balcony railing and main door fanlight."

At the start of World War II, Laferla was interned as an italophile, but instead of being exiled to Uganda he was detained at the St Agatha camp in Rabat. He died there in 1942, victim of an air bomb attack by the Luftwaffe, at the age of 44.

His son, Renato Laferla was also a well-known architect who pursued modernist designs.
