= Xenorma cytheris =

Scientific classification
- Kingdom: Animalia
- Phylum: Arthropoda
- Clade: Pancrustacea
- Class: Insecta
- Order: Lepidoptera
- Superfamily: Noctuoidea
- Family: Notodontidae
- Genus: Xenorma
- Species: X. cytheris

Binomial name
- Xenorma cytheris (H. Druce, 1891)

Synonyms
- Phaeochlaena cytheris H. Druce, 1891

Species of moth

Xenorma cytheris is a moth of the family Notodontidae first described by Herbert Druce in 1891. It is found in Central America, and Mexico.
