= Stile Littorio =

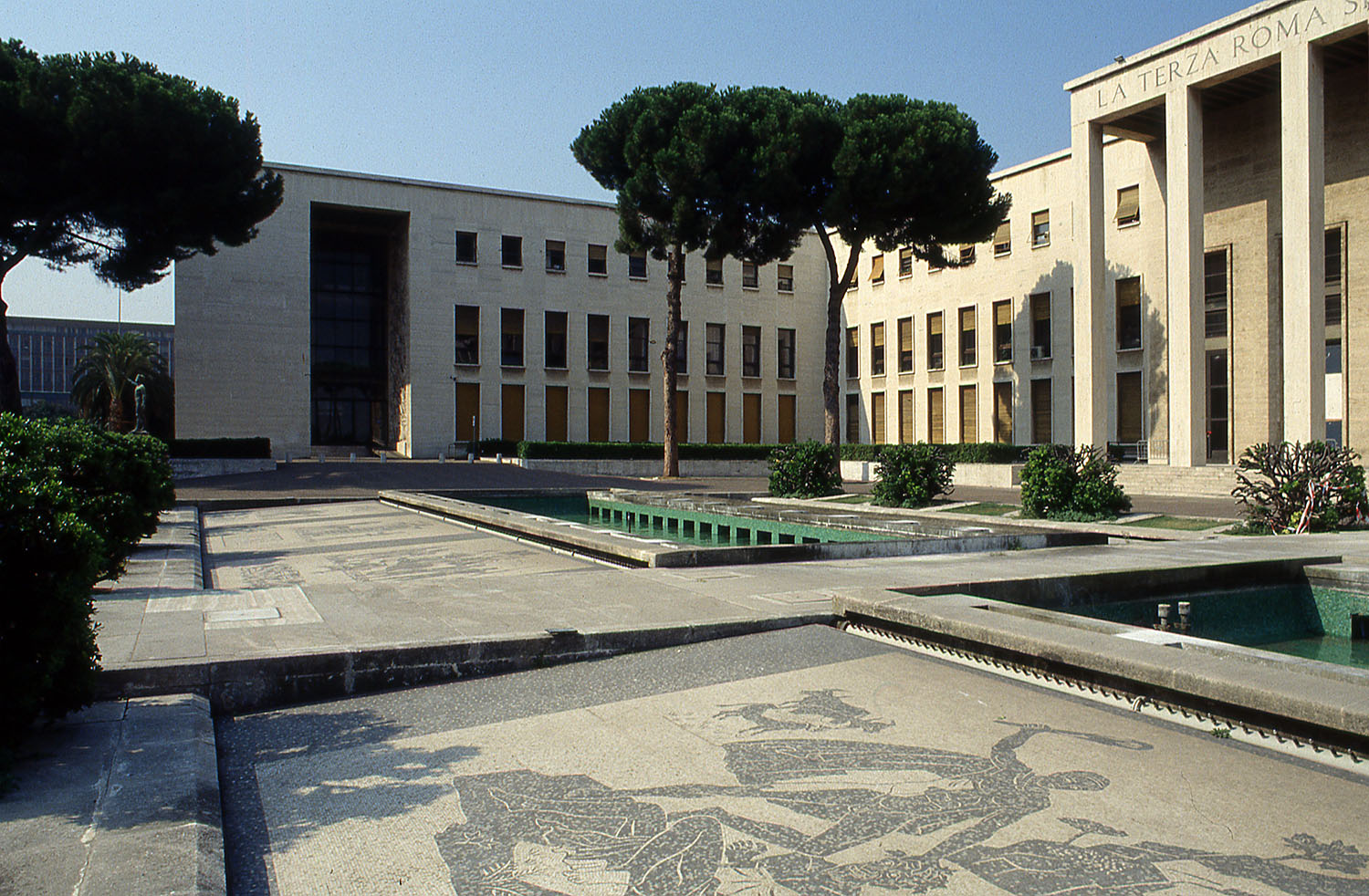
Palazzo Uffici, EUR, Rome

Stile Littorio denotes an architectural language developed in Italy in the 1930s and featured in a large number of public buildings commissioned by the Fascist regime until its fall.

The emergence of Stile Littorio is closely linked to the development of a fascist architectural policy in which, through the direct and indirect influence of the fascist institutions up to Mussolini himself, a formally exemplary, emphasized and dogmatic architectural language, ultimately monumental, had to be promoted, to express the greatness and historical dimension claimed by the regime.

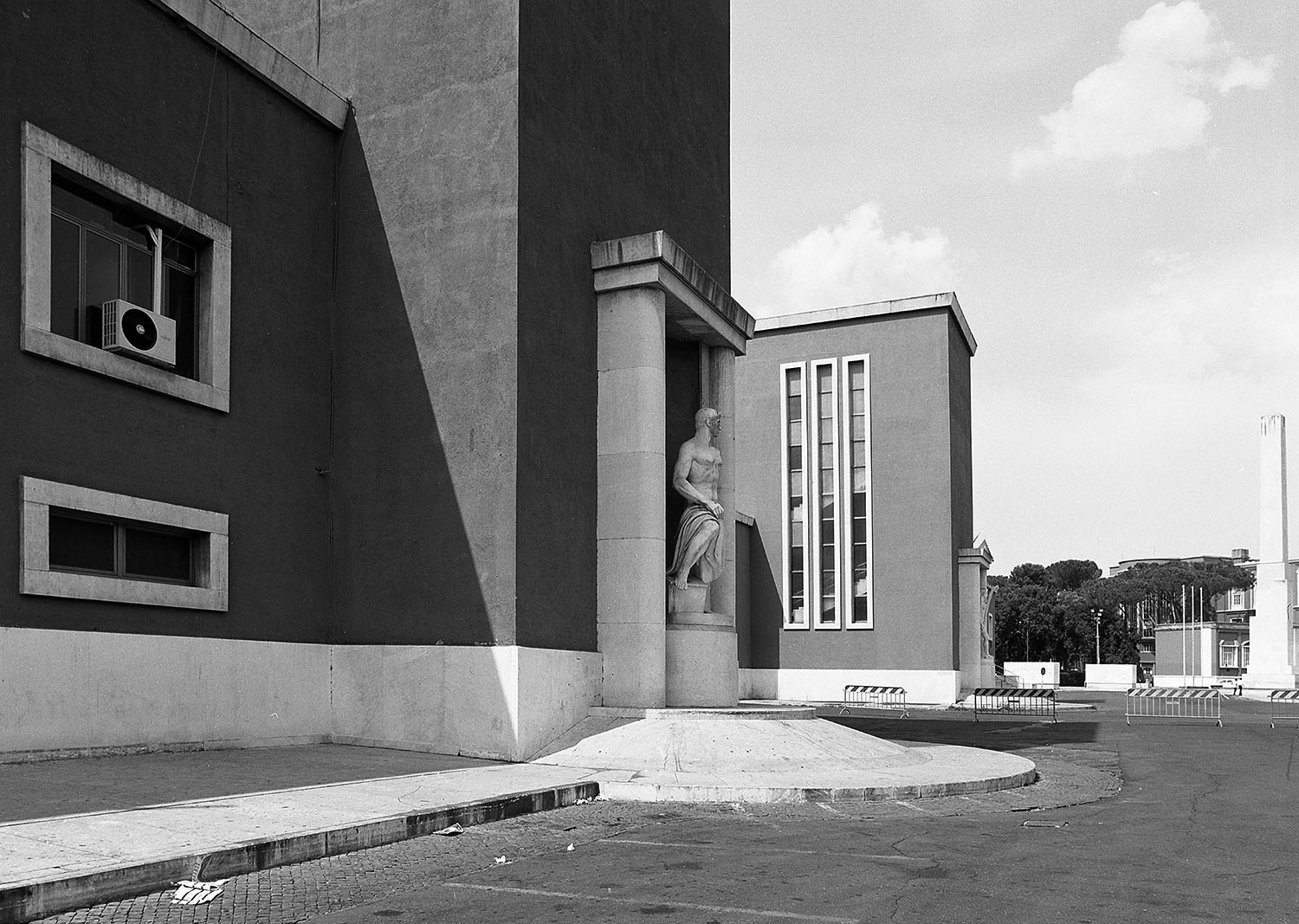
Foro Italico

In the history of Italian architecture, the term Stile Littorio refers to those buildings and urban spaces from the fascist period which were built in "mostly rhetorical and monumental forms". It denotes a simplified architecture, decidedly classicistic in its perpetual use of the ancient Roman building heritage. This way of designing architecture, characterized by the combination of abstraction and a concrete historical vocabulary of forms, took its name, which refers to the fasces symbols of fascism, already in the 1930s, so as to distinguish a design trend in progress and favored by the fascist regime especially for public works. The Stile Littorio therefore denotes an expression of state architecture that aimed to homogenize the various currents of architectural language in Italy in the twenties, merging monumentalism and classicism with rationalism in search of a unitary, connotative and recognizable national style, at the service of an image of the fascist state that was connoted as progressive and at the same time as the continuer of a great past, above all to demonstrate its power through the measure and volumetric simplicity emphasized in a state monumentalism.

The term Stile Littorio was used for the first time when Saverio Palozzi presented the results of the first competition held in 1934 for the national headquarters of the Partito Nazionale Fascista.

== Bibliography ==
- Joshua Arthurs: Excavating Modernity: The Roman Past in Fascist Italy. Ithaca 2012.
- Carmen M. Enss und Luigi Monzo: ‘Terms and Conditions’ of Interwar Architecture and Urbanism in Italy: A Tentative Glossary. In: Enss, Carmen M. und Luigi Monzo (eds.): Townscapes in Transition. Transformation and Reorganization of Italian Cities and their Architecture in the Interwar Period. Bielefeld 2019, p. 270.
- Patrick, Goode (ed.): The Oxford Companion to Architecture. 2 volumi. New York 2009, vol. 2, pp. 872f.
- Andrew J. Manson: Rationalism and Ruins in Roma Mussoliniana: The 1934 Palazzo del Littorio Competition. New York 2015 (Dissertation, Columbia University, 2015).
- Luigi Monzo: Croci e fasci – Der italienische Kirchenbau in der Zeit des Faschismus, 1919–1945. Karlsruhe 2017 (Tesi di dottorato, Karlsruhe Institute of Technology, 2017), pp. 146–154.
- F. Saverio Palozzi: Il nuovo stile littorio: I progetti per il Palazzo del Littorio e della Mostra della Rivoluzione Fascista in via dell’Impero. Milano 1936.
- Paolo Nicoloso, Architetture per un'identità italiana, Udine, Gaspari, 2012, ISBN 9788875412586.

== See also ==
- Fascist architecture
- Novecento Italiano
- Stripped Classicism
