= Xenorma pictifrons =

Scientific classification
- Kingdom: Animalia
- Phylum: Arthropoda
- Clade: Pancrustacea
- Class: Insecta
- Order: Lepidoptera
- Superfamily: Noctuoidea
- Family: Notodontidae
- Genus: Xenorma
- Species: X. pictifrons

Binomial name
- Xenorma pictifrons (Warren, 1907)

Synonyms
- Phaeochlaena pictifrons Warren, 1907

Species of moth

Xenorma pictifrons is a moth of the family Notodontidae. It is found mainly in Peru.
