= Grass Tree Conservation Park =

Protected area in South Australia

- IUCN category III (natural monument or feature)
- Location within South Australia
- Location: South Australia
- Nearest city: Naracoorte
- Coordinates: 36°48′29″S 140°41′31″E
- Area: 16 ha (40 acres)
- Established: 17 August 1972
- Visitors: ‘very little visitor use’ (in 1992)
- Governing body: Department for Environment and Water

Grass Tree Conservation Park is a protected area in the Australian state of South Australia located in the state's Limestone Coast in the gazetted locality of Cadgee about 17 kilometres (11 mi) north of the town centre in Naracoorte.

The conservation park occupies land in section 451 of the cadastral unit of the Hundred of Hynam on the southern side of Boddingtons West Road. It was proclaimed under the National Parks and Wildlife Act 1972 on 17 August 1972 for the purpose of protecting a stand of grass tree.

While the crown land on which the conservation park was established had not been cleared for agricultural use, evidence of disturbance of the understorey in an open forest area and the associated presence of introduced grasses suggests that the land was “previously grazed by domestic livestock”.

In 1992, the conservation park was described as follows. Firstly, the soils within the conservation park are reported as being located in the “Naracoorte Environmental Association” which is “characterised by calcarenite dune ridges overlain by dunes or sheets of mobile sand”. Specifically, the majority of the soils in the conservation park are “deep, acid, bleached sands with a yellow-grey B horizon” while a minority consist of “shallower alkaline sandy soils of a reddish colour”. Secondly, land within the conservation park supported the following “three vegetation associations:”

1. a “low woodland “ of brown stringybark “associated with sandy soils of the stranded dune systems of the West Naracoorte Range”,
2. an “open forest - low open forest” of pink gum associated with a stoney limestone rise in the central part” of the conservation park and “an understorey generally consisting of introduced grasses and pasture weeds such as Cape weed (Arctotheca calendula);” and
3. a ”small area” of “open forest” of South Australian blue gum in the south-east in the conservation park's south-east with “an understorey of grass trees, Austral bracken (pteridium esculentum), and rice flower (Pimelea sp.)”.

As of 1992, the conservation park had “very little visitor use”. There were no facilities being provided for visitors apart from “boundary access tracks” of 5 metres (16 ft) width to its west, south and east boundaries.

The conservation park is classified as an IUCN Category III protected area.

== See also ==
- Protected areas of South Australia
