= Xenorma biorbiculata =

Scientific classification
- Kingdom: Animalia
- Phylum: Arthropoda
- Clade: Pancrustacea
- Class: Insecta
- Order: Lepidoptera
- Superfamily: Noctuoidea
- Family: Notodontidae
- Genus: Xenorma
- Species: X. biorbiculata

Binomial name
- Xenorma biorbiculata (Warren, 1909)

Synonyms
- Phaeochlaena biorbiculata Warren, 1909

Species of moth

Xenorma biorbiculata is a moth of the family Notodontidae. It is endemic to the Upper Amazon of Brazil.
