= The British Empire: A survey =

1924 series of 12 books

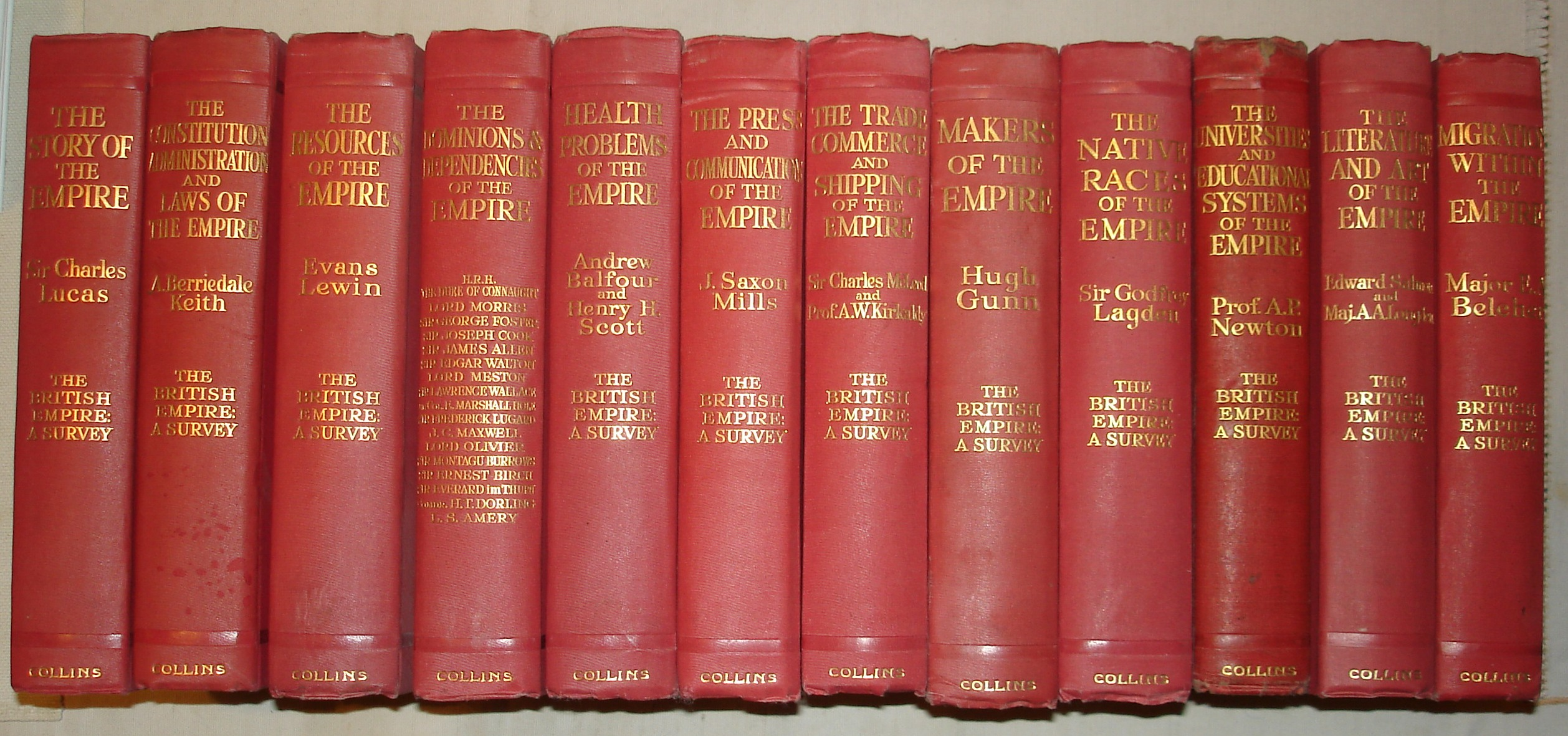
- Edited by: Hugh Gunn
- Country: United Kingdom
- Publisher: Collins
- Published: 1924
- No. of books: 12

The British Empire: A survey is a series of twelve books, each self-contained, published for educational purposes during the British Empire Exhibition in Wembley Park, London, by Collins in 1924, following the request of the Exhibition's management towards the Imperial Studies Committee of the Royal Colonial Institute to create this work.

The series' General Editor was Hugh Gunn and the Advisory Committee members were Sir Charles P. Lucas, KCB, KCMG (Chairman); The Rt Hon Lord Morris, KCMG, LL.D.; Sir Harry Wilson, KCMG, KBE; Arthur Percival Newton, M.A., D.Litt., B.Sc., F.S.A.; and the late Sir George R. Parkin, KCMG, LL.D.

== The volumes ==
- I. The Dominions and Dependencies of the Empire, Forewords by HRH the Duke of Connaught and the Rt. Hon. Leo Amery, First Lord of the Admiralty: 13 chapters by various authors
- II. The Story of the Empire, by Sir Charles Lucas
- III. The Constitution, Administration, and Laws of the Empire, by Prof. A. Berriedale Keith
- IV. The Resources of the Empire and Their Development, by Evans Lewin
- V. Health Problems of the Empire - Past, Present, and Future by Dr. Andrew Balfour and Dr. H. H. Scott
- VI. The Press and Communications of the Empire, by J. Saxon Mills
- VII. The Trade, Commerce, and Shipping of the Empire, by Sir Charles McLeod and Prof. A. W. Kirkaldy
- VIII. Makers of the Empire, by Hugh Gunn
- IX. The Native Races of the Empire, by Sir Godfrey Lagden
- X. The Universities and Educational Systems of the Empire, by Arthur Percival Newton
- XI. The Literature of the Empire and The Art of the Empire by Edward Salmon and Major A. A. Longden
- XII. Migration Within the Empire, by Major E. A. Belcher and James A. Williamson

== See also ==
- British Empire Exhibition
- British Empire
- Colonial Exhibitions

== Sources ==
- Lucas, Charles P. (1924). Gunn, Hugh (ed.). The Story of the Empire. New York: Henry Holt and Company.
