= Xenorma leucocrypta =

Scientific classification
- Kingdom: Animalia
- Phylum: Arthropoda
- Clade: Pancrustacea
- Class: Insecta
- Order: Lepidoptera
- Superfamily: Noctuoidea
- Family: Notodontidae
- Genus: Xenorma
- Species: X. leucocrypta

Binomial name
- Xenorma leucocrypta (Dognin, 1909)

Synonyms
- Polypoetes leucocrypta Dognin, 1909

Species of moth

Xenorma leucocrypta is a moth of the family Notodontidae. It is found in Venezuela and Brazil.

The larvae feed on Cecropia species.
