= Xenorma ravida =

Scientific classification
- Kingdom: Animalia
- Phylum: Arthropoda
- Clade: Pancrustacea
- Class: Insecta
- Order: Lepidoptera
- Superfamily: Noctuoidea
- Family: Notodontidae
- Genus: Xenorma
- Species: X. ravida

Binomial name
- Xenorma ravida Miller, 2008

Species of moth

Xenorma ravida is a moth of the family Notodontidae. It is found in western Ecuador.

The length of the forewings is 13–16 mm for males and 14.5-16.5 mm for females.
