= British Empire Exhibition postage stamps =

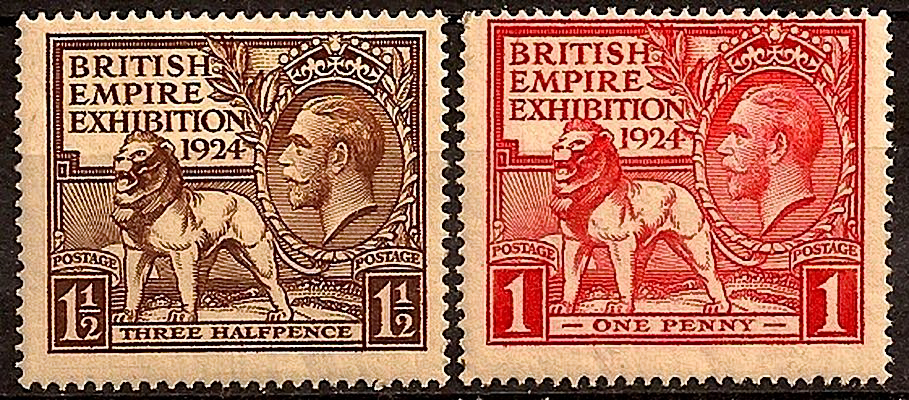
Stamps for the 1924 British Empire Exhibition.

Two postage stamps were issued to commemorate the British Empire Exhibition, a colonial exhibition held in Wembley Park, Wembley, in 1924. Two denominations, a 1d scarlet and 1½d brown, were produced. When the Exhibition reopened in 1925, they were re-issued with the same design, but the dates were changed to read "1925" instead of "1924".

The stamps were printed in sheets of 120 which consisted of two panes of 60 (10 rows of 6). These panes were separated prior to issue to the post office making a post office sheet.

Two types of perforation exist across both issues, both of which are gauge 14. Initially the perforations were created by a line machine, producing small holes. This was later changed to a comb machine, producing larger holes.
