= Xenorma ovata =

Scientific classification
- Kingdom: Animalia
- Phylum: Arthropoda
- Clade: Pancrustacea
- Class: Insecta
- Order: Lepidoptera
- Superfamily: Noctuoidea
- Family: Notodontidae
- Genus: Xenorma
- Species: X. ovata

Binomial name
- Xenorma ovata (Dognin, 1900)

Synonyms
- Phaeochlaena ovata Dognin, 1900

Species of moth

Xenorma ovata is a moth of the family Notodontidae. It is found in Colombia.
