= Xenorma grandimacula =

Scientific classification
- Kingdom: Animalia
- Phylum: Arthropoda
- Clade: Pancrustacea
- Class: Insecta
- Order: Lepidoptera
- Superfamily: Noctuoidea
- Family: Notodontidae
- Genus: Xenorma
- Species: X. grandimacula

Binomial name
- Xenorma grandimacula Hering, 1925

Species of moth

Xenorma grandimacula is a moth of the family Notodontidae. It is found in Bolivia and Peru.
