= Xenorma australis =

Scientific classification
- Kingdom: Animalia
- Phylum: Arthropoda
- Clade: Pancrustacea
- Class: Insecta
- Order: Lepidoptera
- Superfamily: Noctuoidea
- Family: Notodontidae
- Genus: Xenorma
- Species: X. australis

Binomial name
- Xenorma australis L. B. Prout, 1918

Synonyms
- Xenorma deleta Prout, 1918; Xenorma reducta Hering, 1925

Species of moth

Xenorma australis is a moth of the family Notodontidae. It is found in Brazil.
