= Xenorma =

Scientific classification
- Kingdom: Animalia
- Phylum: Arthropoda
- Clade: Pancrustacea
- Class: Insecta
- Order: Lepidoptera
- Superfamily: Noctuoidea
- Family: Notodontidae
- Tribe: Dioptini
- Genus: Xenorma; Prout, 1918

Genus of moths

Xenorma is a genus of moths of the family Notodontidae. It consists of the following species:

- Xenorma australis Prout, 1918
- Xenorma biorbiculata (Warren, 1909)
- Xenorma cytheris (Druce, 1891)
- Xenorma exturbata Hering, 1925
- Xenorma grandimacula Hering, 1925
- Xenorma leucocrypta (Dognin, 1909)
- Xenorma ovata (Dognin, 1900)
- Xenorma pictifrons (Warren, 1907)
- Xenorma ravida Miller, 2008
