= British Empire Exhibition =

Colonial exhibition held in 1924 and 1925

Coordinates: 51°33′31″N 0°16′47″W

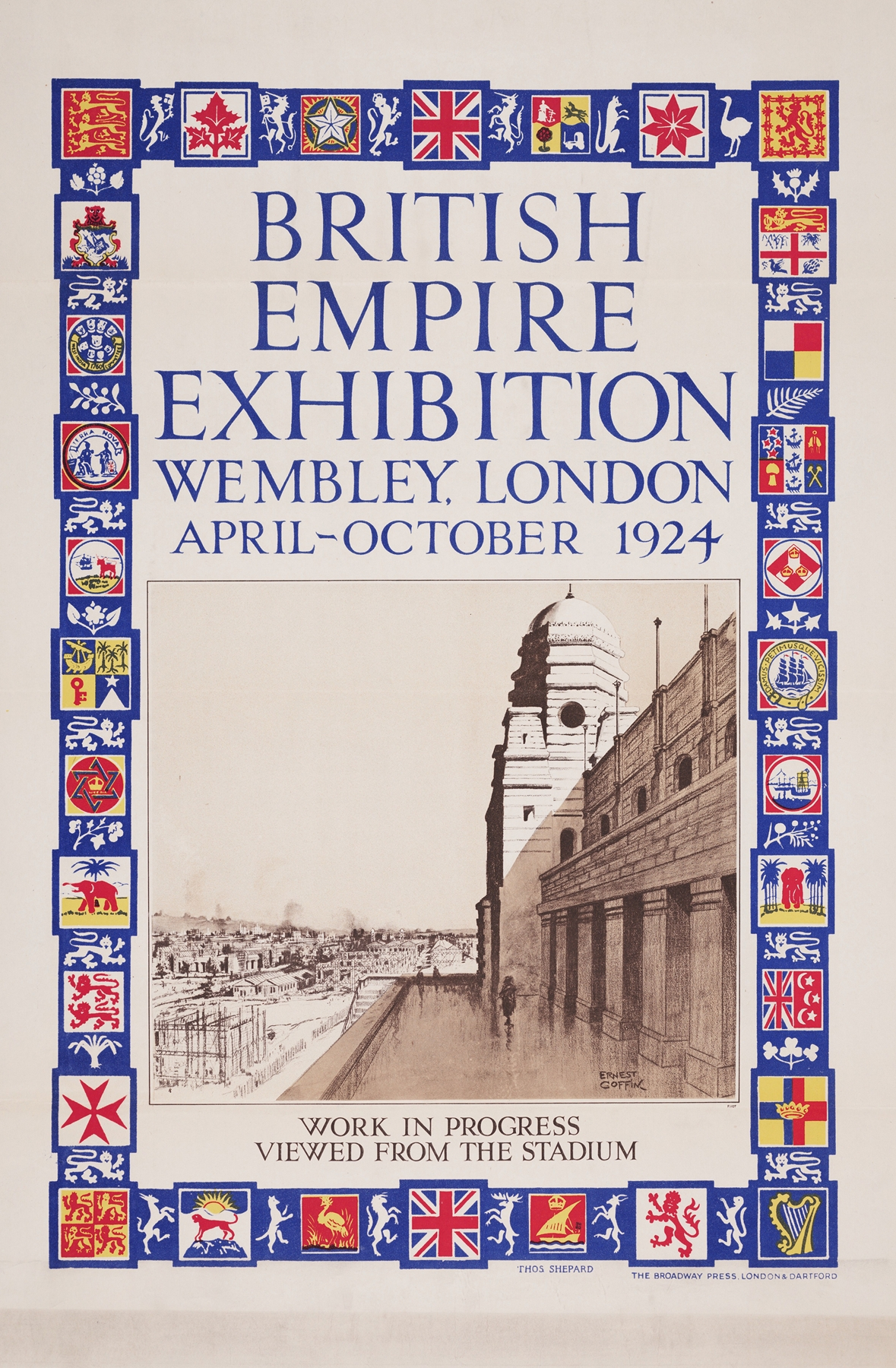
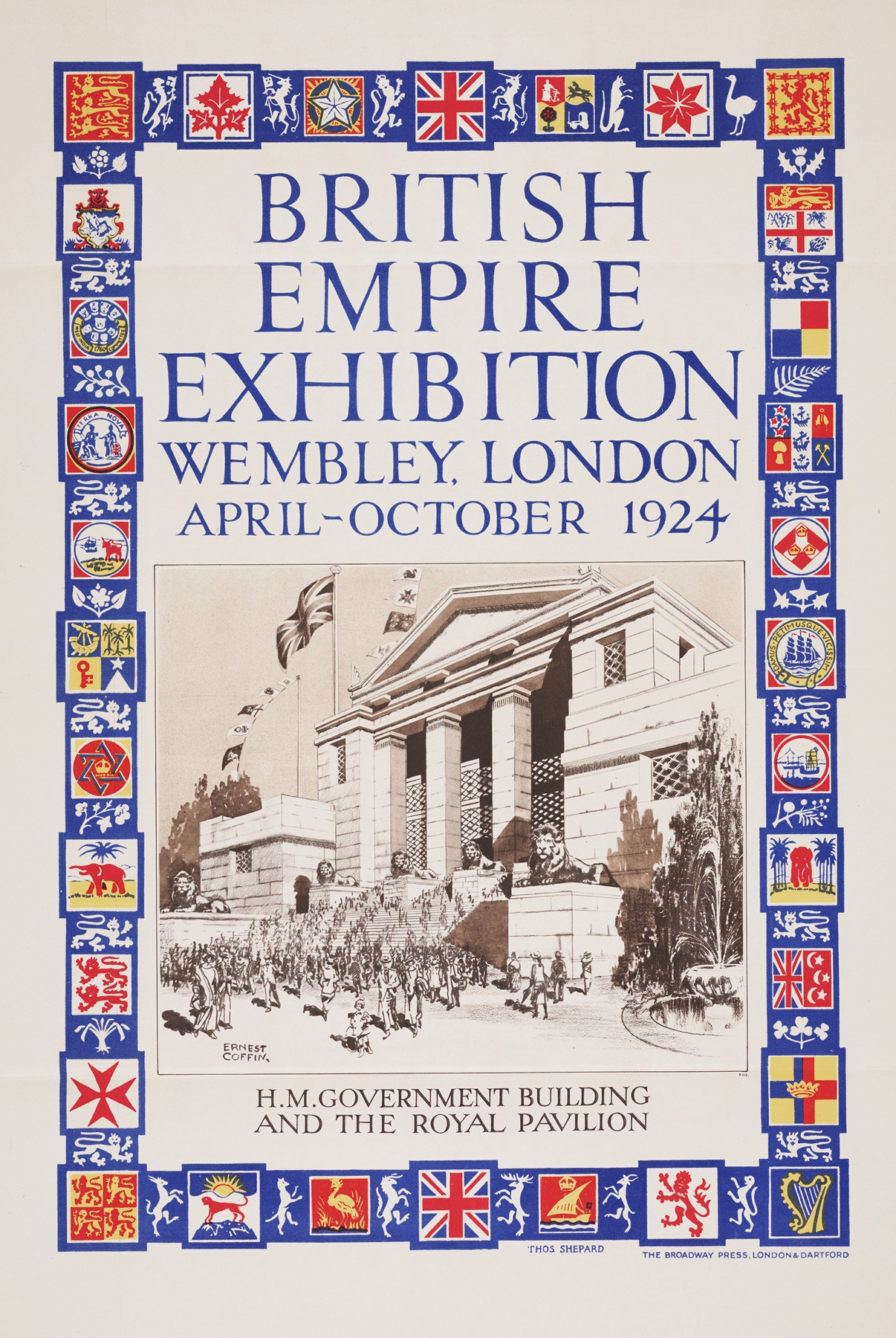
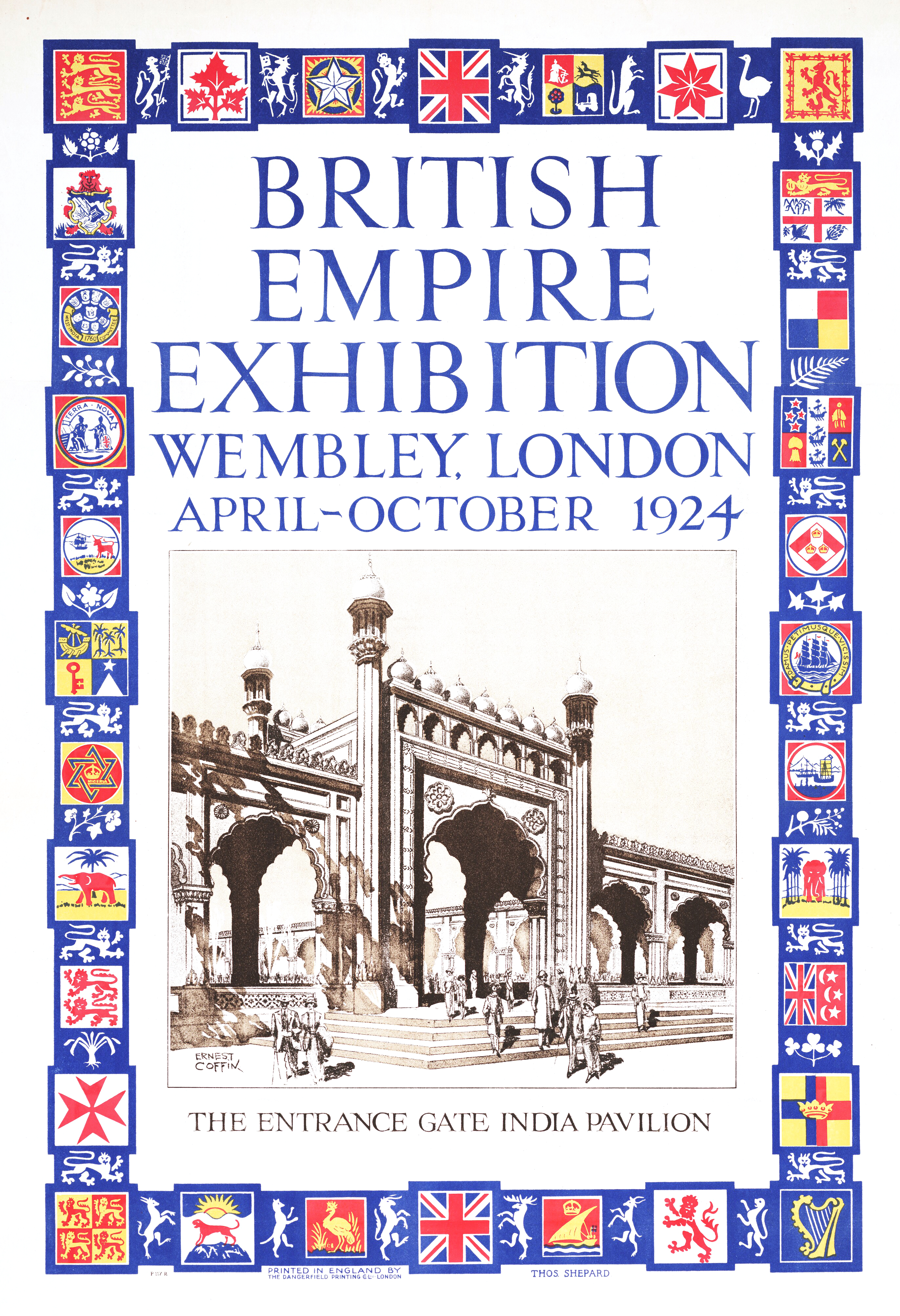
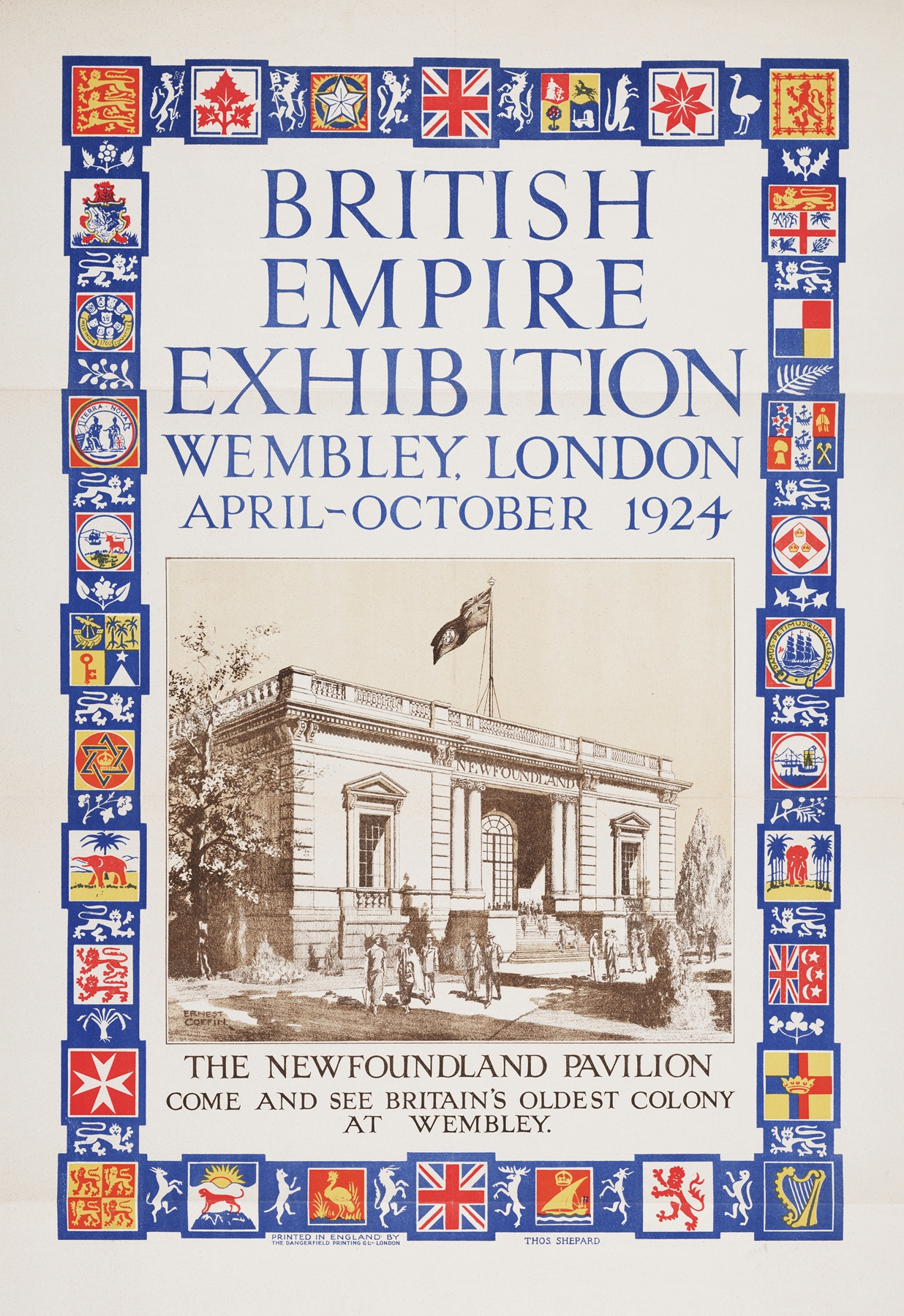
Exhibition posters

The British Empire Exhibition was a colonial exhibition held at Wembley Park, London England from 23 April to 1 November 1924 and from 9 May to 31 October 1925.

== Background ==
In 1920 the British Government decided to site the British Empire Exhibition at Wembley Park on the site of the pleasure gardens created by Edward Watkin in the 1890s. A British Empire Exhibition had first been proposed in 1902, by the British Empire League, and again in 1913. The Russo-Japanese War had prevented the first plan from being developed and World War I put an end to the second, though there had been a Festival of Empire in 1911, held in part at Crystal Palace.

One of the reasons for the suggestion was a sense that other powers were challenging Britain on the world stage. Despite victory in World War I, this was in some ways even truer in 1919. The country had economic problems and its naval supremacy was being challenged by two of its former allies, the United States and Japan. In 1917 Britain had committed itself eventually to leave India, which effectively signalled the end of the British Empires, while the Dominions had shown little interest in following British foreign policy since the war. It was hoped that the exhibition would strengthen the bonds within the Empire, stimulate trade and demonstrate British greatness both abroad and at home, where the public was believed to be increasingly uninterested in Empire.

Wembley Urban District Council was opposed to the idea, as was The Times, which considered Wembley too far from Central London.

A world tour headed by Major Ernest Belcher in 1922 that lasted ten months was mounted to promote participation in the exhibition, with Agatha Christie and her husband among the participants.

The British Empire Exhibition ran from April 1924 to October 1925, closing over the winter, and it made Wembley a household name. In 1919, the Prince of Wales (later Edward VIII) had become the president of the organising committee for the proposed exhibition at Wembley Park, north-west London, although the closing ceremony was presided over by his brother, the future George VI. The Prince wished for the exhibition to boast "a great national sports ground" and so exercised some influence on the creation of Wembley Stadium at Wembley Park in 1923.

== Empire Stadium ==
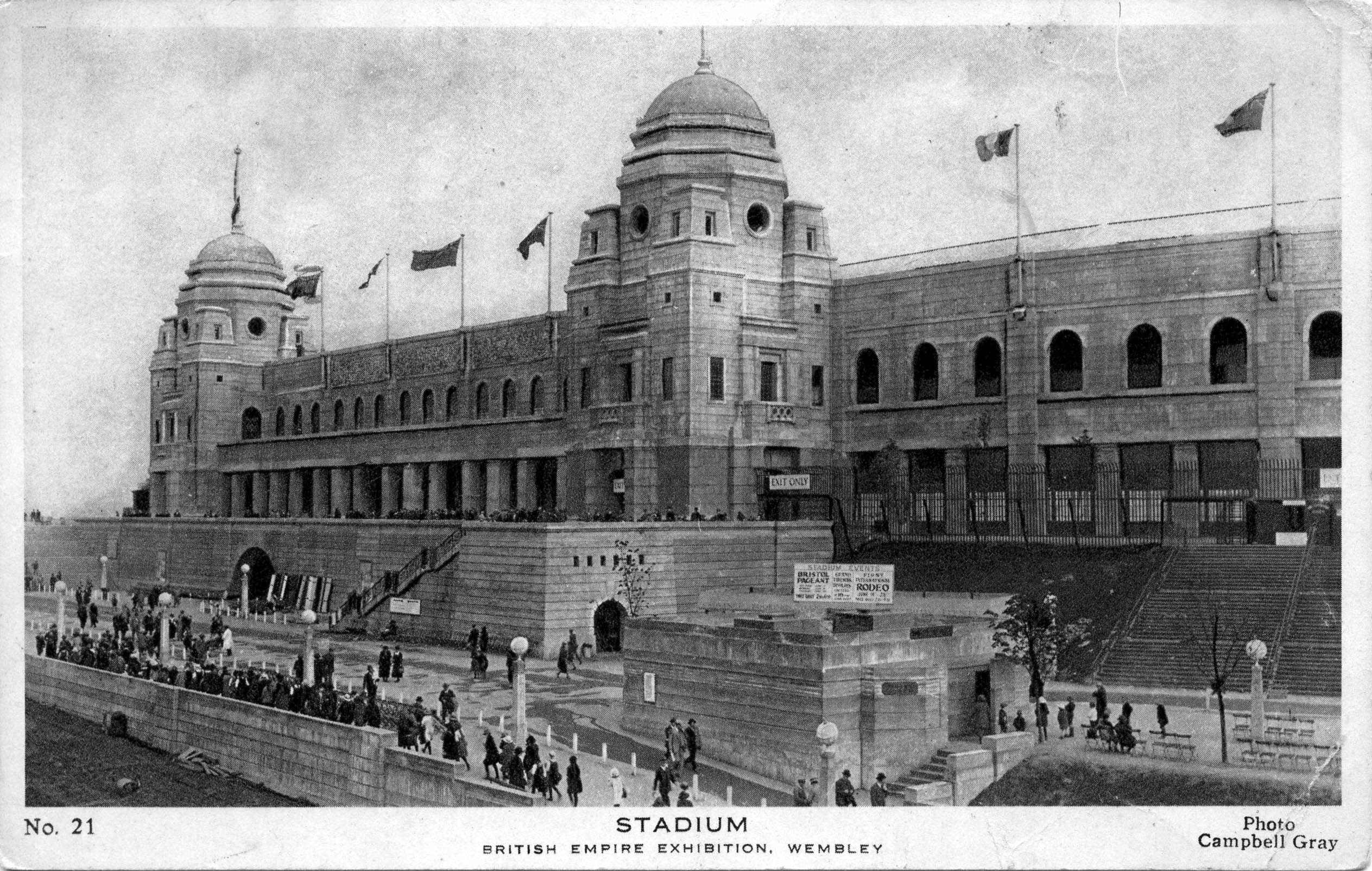
1924 Postcard showing the Empire Stadium, later Wembley Stadium, which would become England's national football stadium. The stadium's distinctive Twin Towers became its trademark.

A purpose-built "great national sports ground", called the Empire Stadium, was built for the exhibition. This became Wembley Stadium.

The first turf for this stadium was cut on the site of the old tower on 10 January 1922. 250,000 tons of earth were then removed, and the new structure constructed within ten months, opening well before the rest of the exhibition was ready. Designed by John William Simpson and Maxwell Ayrton, and built by Sir Robert McAlpine, it could hold 125,000 people, 30,000 of them seated. The building was an unusual mix of Roman imperial and Mughal architecture.

Although it incorporated a football pitch, it was not solely intended as a football stadium. Its quarter mile running track, incorporating a 220-yard (200 m) straight track (the longest in the country) was seen as being at least equally important.

The only standard gauge locomotive involved in the construction of the stadium has survived, and still runs on Sir William McAlpine's private Fawley Hill railway near Henley.

== Exhibition station ==
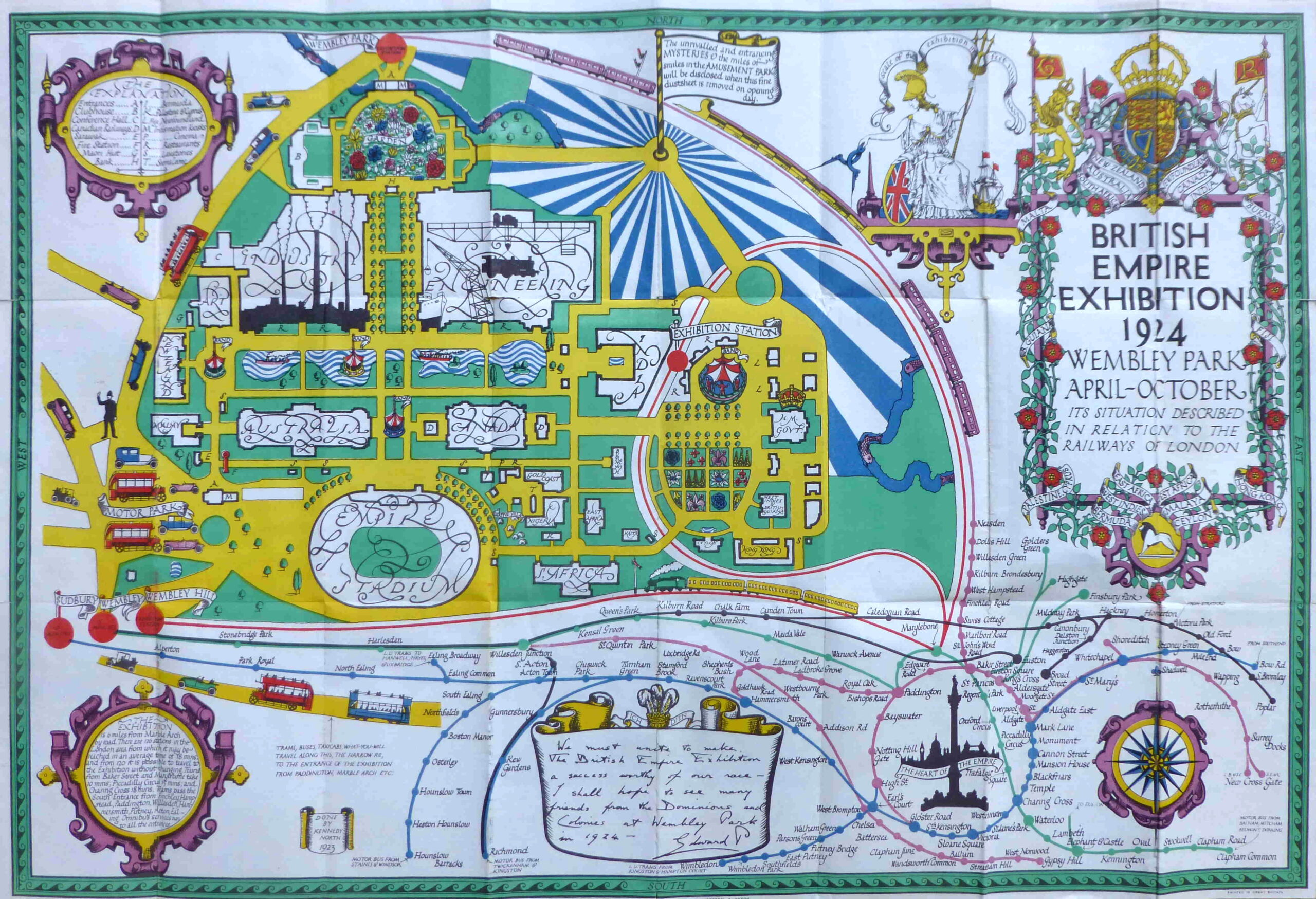
Plan of the exhibition by Stanley Kennedy North

Wembley Park station was rebuilt for the British Empire Exhibition and a new station, Exhibition Station (Wembley), was built on a spur to connect the station to Marylebone. Exhibition station opened on 28 April 1923, the day of Wembley Stadium's first FA cup final. It was later renamed Wembley Exhibition, and then, in February 1928, Wembley Stadium. It was only really used to transport spectators to Wembley events. It stopped carrying passengers in May 1968 and officially closed on 1 September 1969.

== Design and construction ==
The exhibition presented a creative challenge, in that its concept required a large number of buildings in a variety of styles. This offered the architects a unique opportunity to experiment. To simplify construction, the main building material used for the exhibition buildings was reinforced concrete, (then called "ferro-concrete"), selected for its speed of construction. Wembley Park thus earned the title of the first "concrete city" the world had ever seen. Like the stadium, the other exhibition buildings were designed by John William Simpson and Maxwell Ayrton, assisted by engineer Owen Williams. All three had considerable previous experience of using concrete.

Nearly 2,000 men were employed in constructing the exhibition buildings during 1923-1924.

The Indian pavilion had towers and domes, the West African pavilion looked like an Arab fort, the Burmese pavilion was a temple and the South African building reflected the Dutch style.

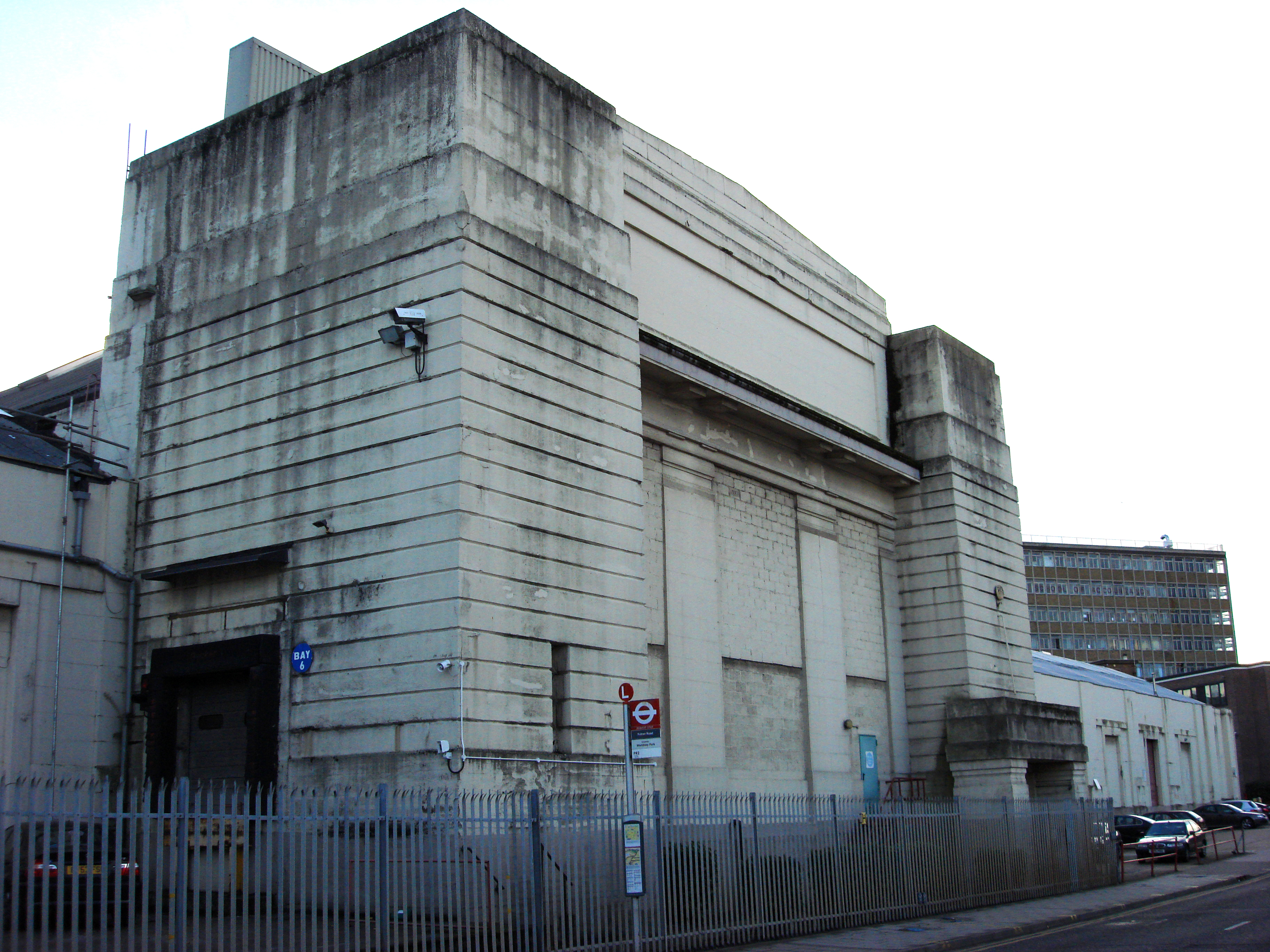
The Palace of Industry building being used as warehousing before it was partially demolished in 2006. The remainder of the building is used for warehousing and small industrial units.

Aside from the stadium and major pavilions to house the works of each dominion, colony or group of colonies, there were four other major structures. These were the palaces of engineering, industry and arts, and HM Government Building. All of these palaces can be seen to have had a Roman Imperial character as befitted their political symbolism. At the time, the Palaces of Industry and Engineering were world's largest reinforced concrete structures.

The exhibition's roads were named by Rudyard Kipling.

The site was also served by Britain's, and possibly the world's, first bus station, which could handle 100,000 passengers a day.

== Opening ceremony ==
The British Empire Exhibition was officially opened by King George V on 23 April 1924 – Saint George's Day. The opening ceremony was broadcast by BBC Radio, the first such broadcast by a British monarch. The King also sent a telegram that travelled around the world in 1 minute 20 seconds before being given back to him by a messenger boy.

== Exhibits ==
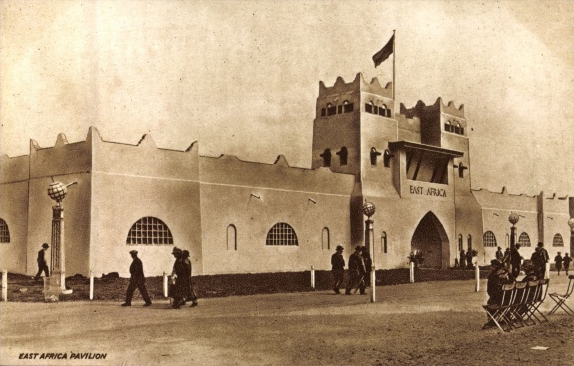
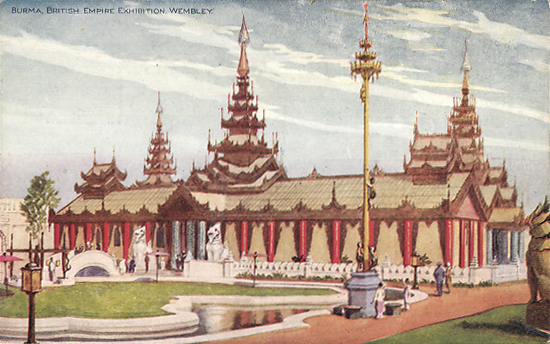
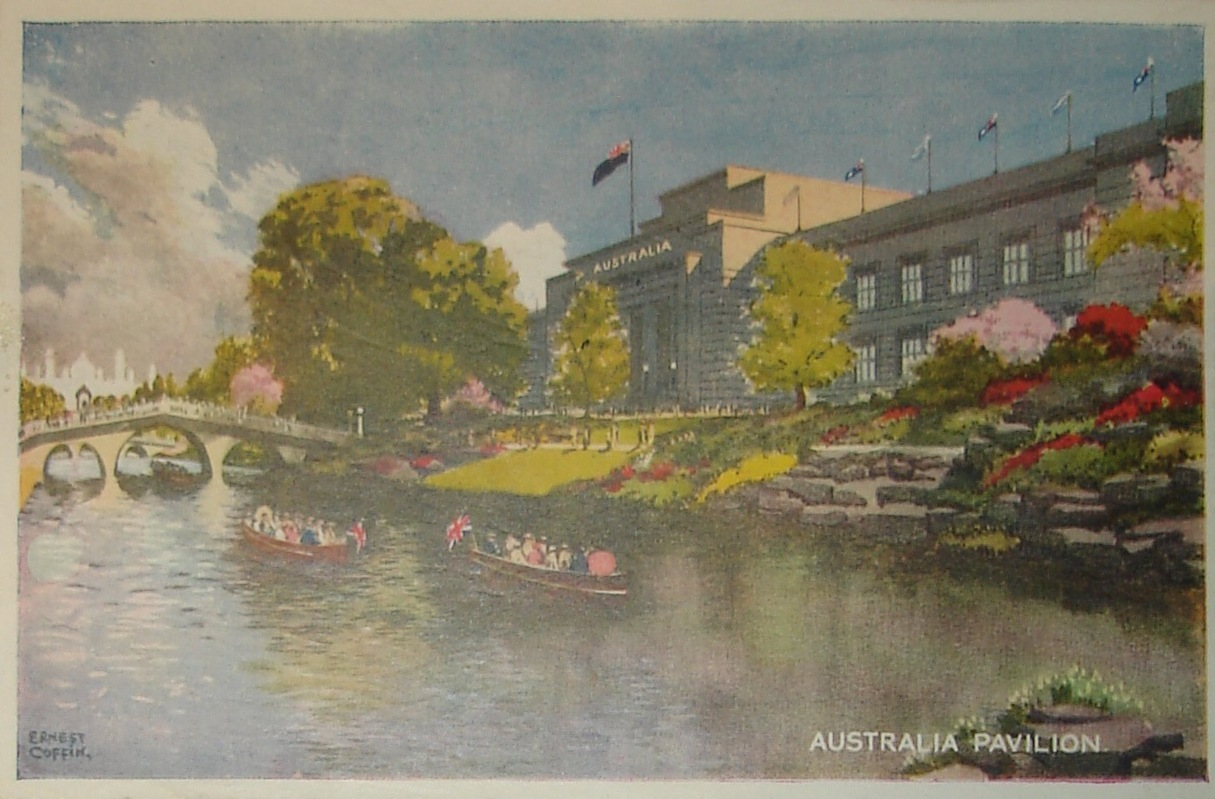
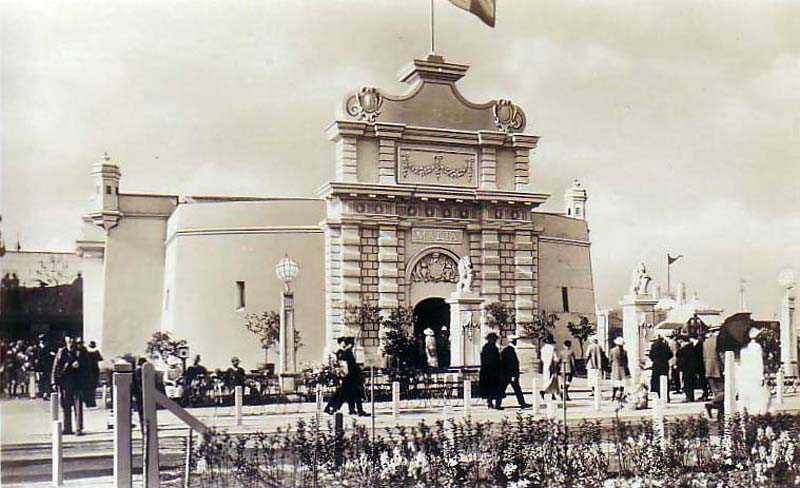
Collage of some of the Pavilions of the British Colonies present at the event. Clockwise starting top left: British East Africa, Burma, Malta and Australia.

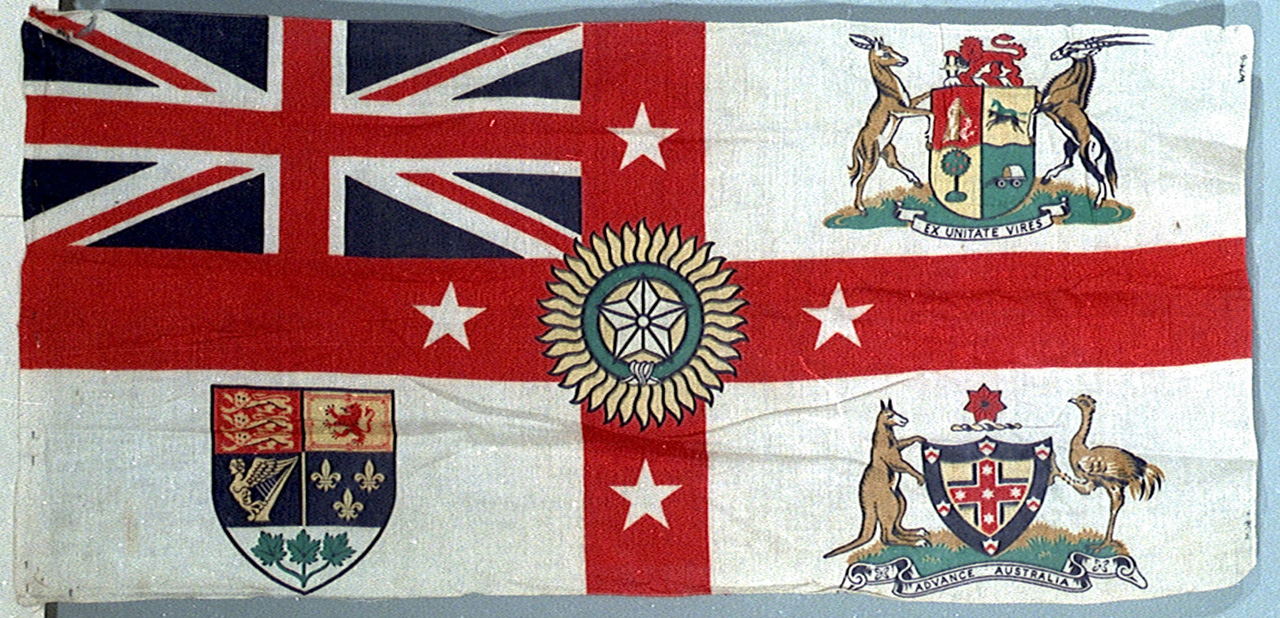
A British Empire flag that was distributed as a souvenir at the exhibition. It combines the symbols of the United Kingdom, Canada, Australia, New Zealand, Newfoundland, South Africa, and India to represent the empire as a whole.

Much of the empire went on display at Wembley Park, but it had to be, of necessity, reduced to a "taster-sized" version. Of the 58 territories which composed the empire at the time, 56 participated with displays and pavilions, the exceptions being The Gambia and Gibraltar. The Irish Free State did not participate either.

The exhibition's official aim was "to stimulate trade, strengthen bonds that bind mother country to her sister states and daughters, to bring into closer contact the one with each other, to enable all who owe allegiance to the British flag to meet on common ground and learn to know each other". It cost £12 million and was the largest exhibition ever staged anywhere in the world. It attracted 27 million visitors.

Admission cost 1s 6d (7 1/2p) for adults and 9d (3 3/4p) for children.

The Palace of Engineering (in 1925 the Palace of Housing & Transport) was the largest exhibition building. It contained a crane capable of moving 25 tons (a practical necessity, not an exhibit) and contained displays on engineering, shipbuilding, electric power, motor vehicles, railways (including locomotives, see below), metallurgy and telegraphs and wireless. In 1925 there seems to have been less emphasis on things that could also be classified as Industry, with instead more on housing and aircraft. The Palace of Industry was slightly smaller. It contained displays on the chemical industry, coal, metals, medicinal drugs, sewage disposal, food, drinks, tobacco, clothing, gramophones, gas and Nobel explosives. Surprisingly the Ulster Pavilion designed by Clough Williams-Ellis was located in the Palace of Industry.

Each colony and dominion was assigned its own distinctive pavilion to reflect local culture and architecture. The Canada Pavilion contained displays on minerals, farming, forestry, the paper industry, water power and Canada as a holiday destination, as well as, in the dairy industry section, a full sized figure of the Prince of Wales, the future Edward VIII, sculpted in butter and preserved in a refrigerated case. This pavilion was also flanked by smaller pavilions dedicated to the Canadian National and Canadian Pacific railways.

The Dominion of Newfoundland pavilion was located next to the HM Government building, and featured a bronze caribou, the emblem of the Royal Newfoundland Regiment. At the conclusion of the exhibition, the memorial was donated by Major William Howe Greene to the citizens of Newfoundland and displayed in Bowring Park.

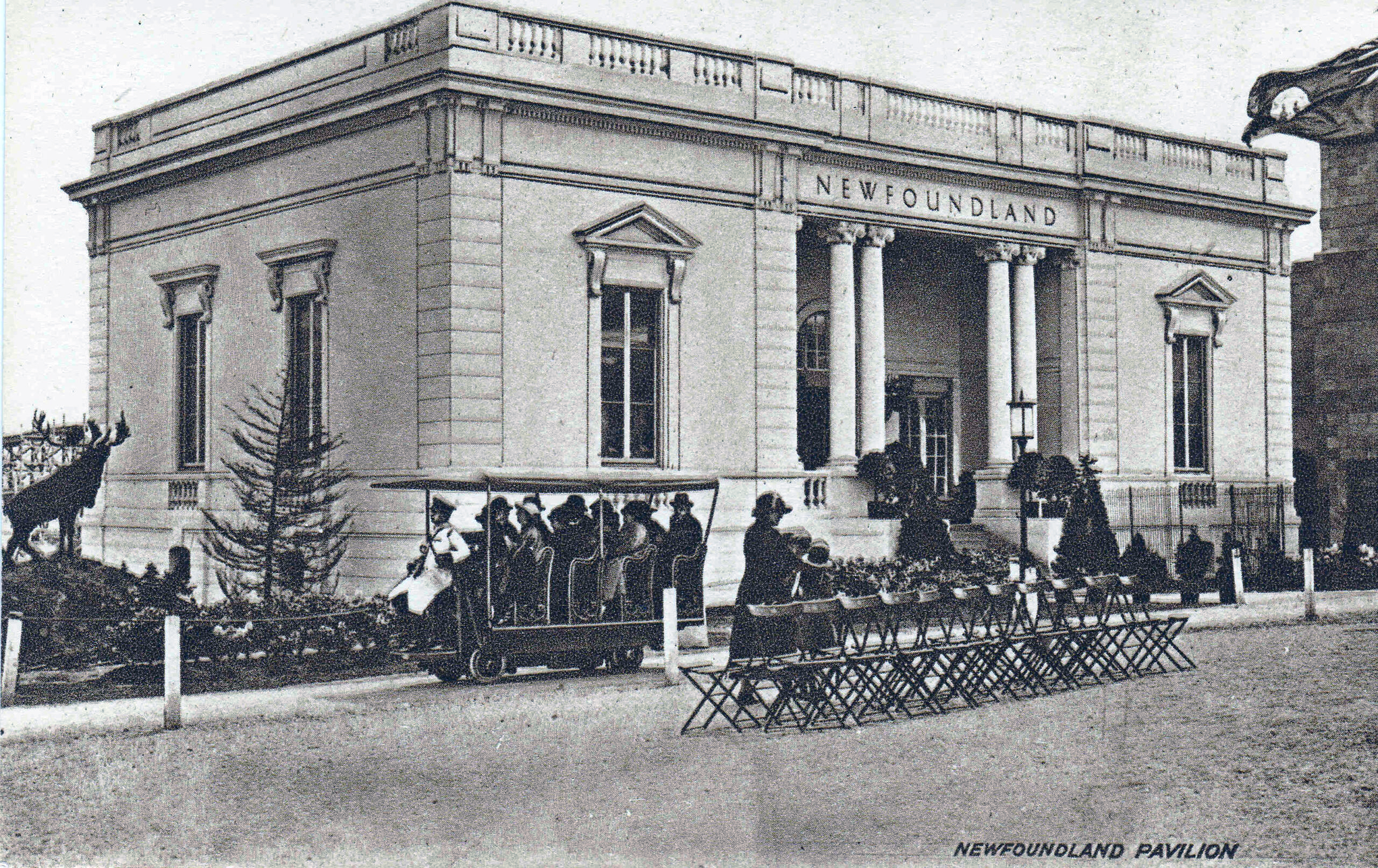
The Newfoundland Pavilion

The Australian Pavilion displayed sheep-shearing and boasted a 16-foot (4.9 m) diameter ball of Australian wool. It also featured a butter sculpture, of legendary England cricketer Jack Hobbs being bowled as England succumbed to the Baggy Greens in a Test match.

Rather smaller was the pavilion shared by the West Indies and British Guiana, south of the HM Government Pavilion. Each of the West Indian islands had a court in the pavilion, as did the Falkland Islands.

The Malta pavilion was modelled on a fortress with its front entrance looking like the Mdina Gate, and its rear like one of Birgu's gates. It was three stories high and had a garden. It was designed by Alberto La Ferla and Joseph Cachia Caruana.

The Palace of Arts, which was fire-proofed, contained historical room sets, as well as painting and sculpture since the eighteenth century. It also displayed Queen Mary's Dolls' House, now at Windsor Castle, which contained miniature bottles of Bass beer.

Kiosks, located both inside and outside the pavilions, represented individual companies within the empire, encouraging commercial opportunities. One such was the Pear's Palace of Beauty (see below). Since the exhibition was the first major event after the war, many firms produced a glut of commemorative items for sale.

The management of the exhibition asked the Imperial Studies Committee of the Royal Colonial Institute to assist them with the educational aspect of the exhibition, which resulted in a 12-volume book, The British Empire: A survey, with Hugh Gunn as the general editor, and which was published in London in 1924.

== Railway exhibits ==
Several railway companies had display stands at the exhibition; in some cases they exhibited their latest locomotives or coaches. Among the exhibits in the Palace of Engineering was the now famous railway locomotive, LNER 4472 Flying Scotsman; this was joined in 1925 by GWR 4079 Pendennis Castle. Several other railway locomotives were exhibited: in 1925, the Southern Railway exhibited no. 866 of their N class, which was brand new, not entering service until 28 November 1925. The 1924 exhibition included a Prince of Wales class 4-6-0 locomotive of London & North Western Railway (LNWR) design, which had been built for the exhibition by the Scottish manufacturer William Beardmore & Company. Beardmore's had previously built similar locomotives for the LNWR, which in 1923 had become a constituent of the newly formed London, Midland & Scottish Railway (LMS); when the exhibition closed in November 1924, the LMS bought the locomotive from Beardmore. A Lancashire & Yorkshire Railway-designed Baltic Tank 4-6-4T, number 11114, built by the LMS at Horwich Works new, was also on display and featured in postcards.

In 1924, the Metropolitan Railway displayed one of its latest Inner Circle cars, a first class driving trailer which had been built in 1923. In 1925, in the Palace of Housing and Transport, the Metropolitan displayed electric locomotive no. 15, with some of the panelling, doors and framework removed from one side, to allow the interior to be viewed; it had been built in 1922. A few years later, it was named Wembley 1924 in honour of the exhibition. Ernest Baguley exhibited their 0-4-0PM narrow-gauge locomotive No. 774.

== Amusement park ==
The American amusement park contractor Frank W. Darling supervised the construction of "the greatest pleasure park the world has ever seen." The thrilling park cost about £2 million. It included a scenic railway called the Great Racer. Another attraction Darling created featured a steep slope adventure called the Great Switchback which operated at speeds of 100 miles an hour.

== Pears' Palace of Beauty ==
The exhibition grounds contained commercial kiosks, run by newspapers, cigarette companies and other businesses. All these structures were designed by the architect Joseph Emberton and his team.

One of the largest kiosks was the Pears' Palace of Beauty, selling souvenir soaps. It was located in the amusement park. The Palace of Beauty was white with two curved staircases leading up to a domed gazebo supported by columns. It was also an exhibition space containing ten soundproofed, glass-fronted rooms, each containing an actress/model dressed as a beautiful woman from history, with accompanying reproduction furniture. The ten beauties were Helen of Troy, Cleopatra, Scheherazade, Dante's Beatrice, Elizabeth Woodville, Mary Queen of Scots, Nell Gwyn, Madame de Pompadour, the actress Sarah Siddons and 'Miss 1924'. There were also two soap-related characters, Bubbles and The Spirit of Purity.

The palace, which charged admission, was open 13 hours a day, so each beauty was depicted by two actresses/models working shifts. Fourteen of the performers were depicted on souvenir postcards. Nearly 750,000 people visited the palace.

== Other attractions ==
In addition to the pavilions and kiosks there was a lake, a funfair, a garden and a working replica coal mine. There were also numerous restaurants, the most expensive of which was the Lucullus restaurant (in 1925 the Wembley Garden Club restaurant) near the exhibition gardens. In 1924, J. Lyons held a monopoly of catering, but the restaurant in the Indian Pavilion used Indian cooks and was advised by Edward Palmer "of Messrs. Veeraswami [sic] & Co." to serve as "Indian Adviser at the restaurant." In 1925 Veeraswamy & Co ran the Indian restaurant, despite the fact that, for reasons both economic and political, the Indian Government did not take part in the 1925 season. Veeraswamy & Co later founded the first Indian restaurant aimed at a non-Anglo-Indian white clientele in England.

After admission, most of the attractions in the grounds were free. They could also be explored after dark. The various buildings of the site were linked by two 'light railways' of unusual construction, the screw-propelled "Never-Stop Railway". and the 'Roadrails' line on which trains were hauled by steam or petrol tractors guided by the rails but with driving wheels running on the ground outside the track. Visitors could also travel in electric "Railodok" buses (little more than basic railway station luggage trolleys fitted with open-sided bodywork, but exciting nonetheless).

== Events ==
The stadium itself was used extensively for performances by massed bands and choirs, military and historical displays, an Edinburgh-like tattoo, fireworks, the first Rugby Union match to be played at Wembley, a simulation of an air attack on London (London Defended, see below) and a genuine rodeo which caused some alarm to animal lovers. A highlight was the elaborate "Pageant of Empire" organised by pageant master Frank Lascelles. This involved thousands of actors and was held in the Empire Stadium from 21 July 1924. The newly appointed Master of the King's Musick, Sir Edward Elgar, composed an "Empire March" for it and the music for a series of songs with words by Alfred Noyes.

In August 1924, an Imperial Jamboree was held at Wembley, attended by 13,000 Boy Scouts from many parts of the empire, the largest Scout camp held anywhere at that time. The event included a series of public displays inside the stadium.

== London Defended ==
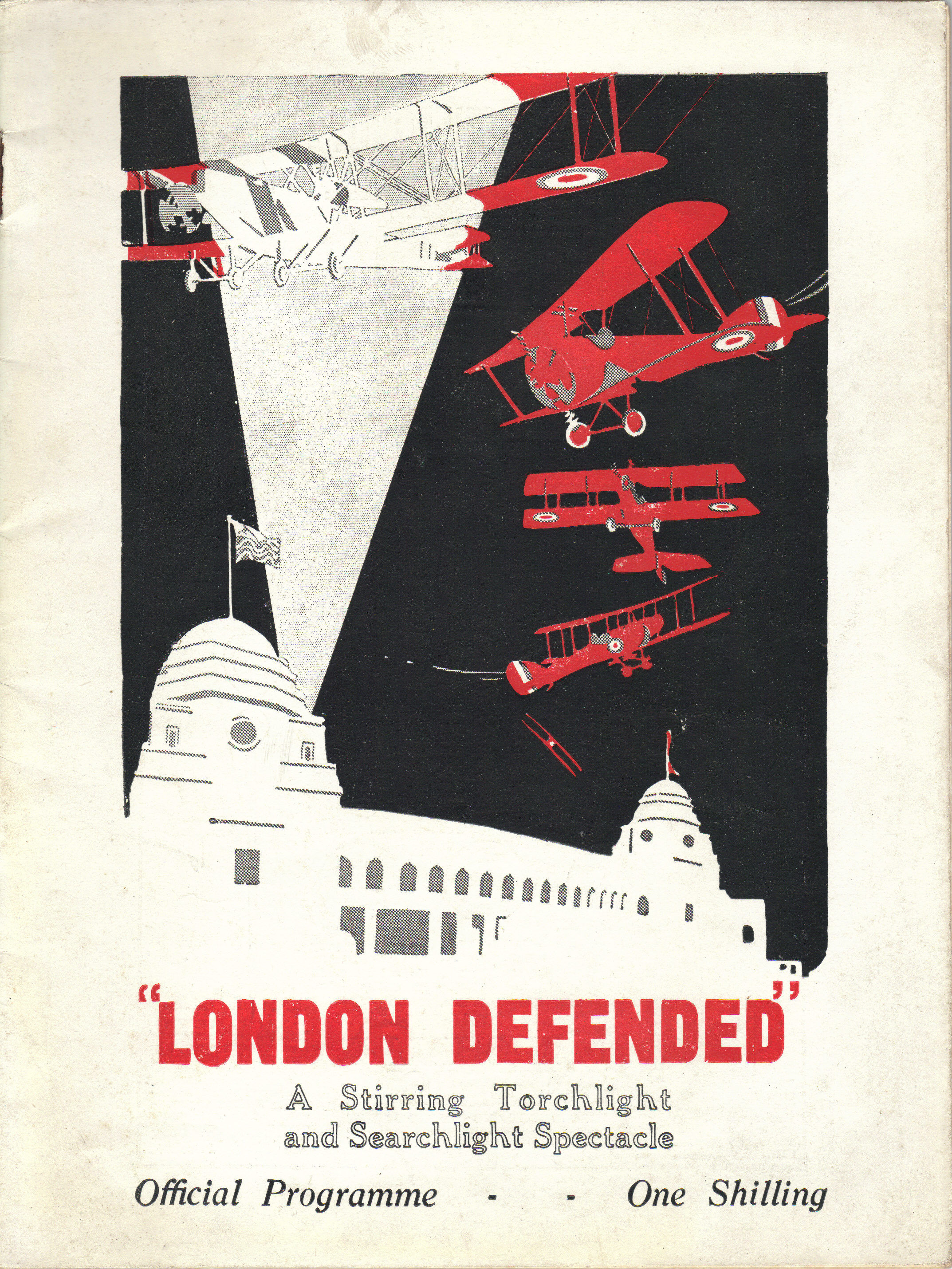
"London Defended" 1925 Official Programme

From 9 May to 1 June 1925, No. 32 Squadron RAF flew an air display six nights a week entitled "London Defended". Similar to the display they had done the previous year, when the aircraft were painted black, it consisted of a night time air display over the Wembley Exhibition flying RAF Sopwith Snipes which were painted red for the display and fitted with white lights on the wings, tail and fuselage. The display involved firing blank ammunition into the stadium crowds and dropping pyrotechnics from the aeroplanes to simulate shrapnel from guns on the ground, Explosions on the ground also produced the effect of bombs being dropped into the stadium by the aeroplanes. One of the pilots in the display was Flying officer C. W. A. Scott who later became famous for breaking three England-Australia solo flight records and winning the MacRobertson Air Race with co-pilot Tom Campbell Black in 1934.

== Philately and numismatics ==
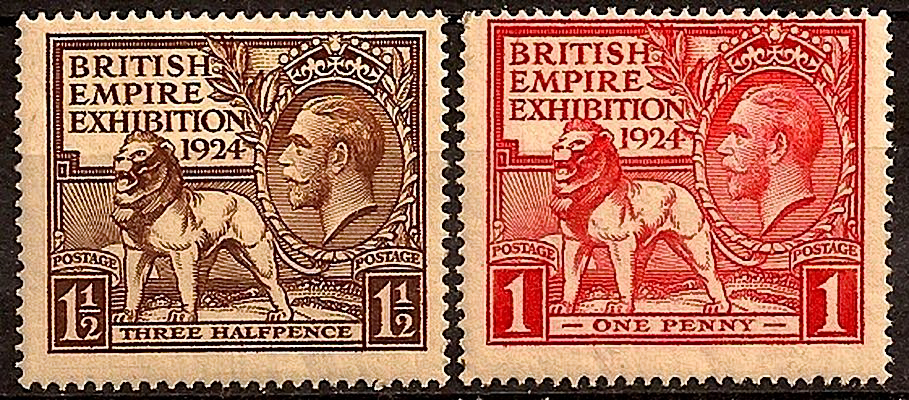
British Empire Exhibition postage stamps

The exhibition is of philatelic interest, as it was the first occasion for which the British Post Office issued commemorative postage stamps. Two stamps were issued on 23 April 1924: a 1d in scarlet, and a 1 1/2d in brown, both being inscribed "British Empire Exhibition 1924"; they were designed by H. Nelson. A second printing, identical to the first apart from the year being changed to 1925, was issued on 9 May 1925. A List of Great Britain commemorative stamps gives further details of British commemorative postage stamps. Envelopes, letter cards, postcards and many other souvenirs commemorating the event were produced as well.

A significant number of medals were struck for the exhibition, both by the organisers and by commercial organisations.

== Commercial outcome ==
Despite providing a wealth of entertainment, the exhibition was not a financial success. Despite 18 million visitors in 1924, the project ended that season without breaking even. In an attempt to raise enough money, the late decision was taken to reopen, with some variations, in 1925, but the exhibition did not do as well in its second season. It closed for good on 31 October 1925, having received 27 million visitors in two years. The final cost reached in excess of £6 million. Variety claimed that it was the world's biggest outdoor failure, costing the UK Government $90 million (over £20 million based on the exchange rates at the time).

Two of the most popular attractions were US dodgem cars and a copy of the tomb of Tutankhamen. Both of these were in the funfair, with the tomb there because the Kingdom of Egypt was no longer a British Protectorate, having been officially independent since 1922 (although in practice still in the British sphere of influence). Other popular attractions included the Queen's Dolls House, the Wild West Rodeo, the dance pavilions, and the amusement park, but had very little to do with the empire as a whole. P. G. Wodehouse's fictional Bertie Wooster may have reflected genuine reactions to the exhibition in preferring the Green Swizzles at the Planters Bar to anything more didactic.

== Survival of stadium ==
Most of the exhibition halls were intended to be temporary and demolished afterwards, but, partly because of the high cost of demolishing such huge concrete structures, the Palace of Engineering and the British Government Pavilion survived more-or-less intact until finally being demolished in late 1982. However, the Palace of Industry and the sacred art section of the Palace of Arts survived until the 2010s. At the suggestion of the chair of the exhibition committee, Scotsman Sir James Stevenson and owing to the intervention of Arthur Elvin, who had been contracted to clear the exhibition site, the Empire Stadium was retained. It became Wembley Stadium, the home of Football in England until 2003, when it was demolished to be replaced by a new stadium.

== Influence on development of Wembley ==
The British Empire Exhibition inevitably led to increased suburban development. An outfall sewer was built to serve the exhibition and a number of roads in the area were straightened and widened, and new road signs installed. In addition, new bus services were introduced to serve the exhibition. Visitors to the exhibition were introduced to Wembley and some were later encouraged to move to the area when houses had been built to accommodate them. Conversely, though the exhibition encouraged the development of Wembley as a typical inter-war suburb, the survival of the stadium ensured that the Empire Exhibition grounds in Wembley Park would remain a major London visitor destination.

== Reception ==
While the exhibition incurred substantial financial losses, this should not be interpreted as the Exhibition being a failure in terms of raw attendance. Eighteen million visitors attended in 1924 and 9 million attended in 1925: a substantial slice of the population of Great Britain in the era even accounting for repeat visitors. The exhibition also garnered huge coverage in the press, with over 2,000 articles in The Times of London about the event from 1923 to 1925. Over 6 million listeners tuned in to the radio broadcast of King George V speech at the opening ceremony. Middlebrow British culture continued to be receptive to the brand of imperial pride the exhibition sought to incubate.

That said, patience with such direct celebration of the British Empire was wearing thin among parts of the intelligentsia of the period, who were less impressed. Edward Elgar, who conducted some of his songs at the opening ceremony, remarked that the pomp and self-importance was "vulgar" and overdone. Virginia Woolf visited the exhibition but was unimpressed; she called it "an outmoded piece of antiquated fiction." Punch magazine lampooned the exhibit, the left-leaning New Statesman mostly ignored it, and the Daily Herald condemned it, writing "to this debased spirit we owe many unnecessary wars, the loss of much valuable blood."

== In popular culture ==
The exhibition is a key location in the P. G. Wodehouse short story, "The Rummy Affair of Old Biffy", in which Sir Roderick Glossop describes it as "the most supremely absorbing and educational collection of objects, both animate and inanimate, gathered from the four corners of the empire, that has ever been assembled in England's history." Bertie Wooster is somewhat less impressed, remarking that "millions of people, no doubt, are so constituted that they scream with joy and excitement at the spectacle of a stuffed porcupine-fish or a glass jar of seeds from Western Australia – but not Bertram".

The British Empire Exhibition features in David Lean's 1944 film This Happy Breed, starring Celia Johnson.

In the 31st episode of The Duchess of Duke Street (1977), a scene opens on Mrs Crocker holding up a large souvenir teatowel from the British Empire Exhibition 1925 as Mary and Starr discuss with other servants what they had enjoyed at the exhibition. The scene ends with old Merriman saying it could not compare with the Great Exhibition.

In Charlie Higson's Young Bond novel SilverFin (Puffin, 2005), the young James Bond is impressed by the height of the rollercoaster at the British Empire Exhibition in 1925.

== See also ==
- Colonial Exhibitions
- Colonialism

== Bibliography ==
- Barres-Baker, M.C., "Secret History Historical Beauties" in Brent Magazine, Issue 130 (February - March 2013), p. 27
- Cohen, S., "The Empire from the Street: Virginia Woolf, Wembley, and Imperial Monuments" in Modern Fiction Studies, Vol. 50, Number 1 (Spring 2004), pp. 85–109
- Davis, A., "A Study in Modernism: the Group of Seven as an Unexpectedly Typical Case" in Journal of Canadian Studies, Spring 1998
- Geppert, Alexander C.T., Fleeting Cities. Imperial Expositions in Fin-de-Siècle Europe, Basingstoke/New York: Palgrave Macmillan, 2010
- Geppert, Alexander C.T., 'True Copies. Time and Space Travels at British Imperial Exhibitions, 1880-1930', in The Making of Modern Tourism. The Cultural History of the British Experience, 1600-2000, eds. Hartmut Berghoff et al., Basingstoke/New York: Palgrave Macmillan, 2002, pp. 223–48
- Goswamy, B.M., Art and Soul: Exhibiting the Empire (The Tribune Online, 5 September 2004)
- Green, Oliver. Metroland : British Empire Exhibition Number, Southbank Publishing, 2015
- Harris, Trevor I., The medals and medallions of the British Empire Exhibition Wembley 1924 - 1925, T.I. Harris, 2003?
- Hewlett, Geoffrey, A History of Wembley, Wembley: Brent Library Service, 1979
- Hughes, D.L., 'Kenya, India and the British Empire Exhibition of 1924' in Race & Class, Vol. 47 No. 4 (2006) pp. 66–85
- Knight, Donald R. & Sabey, Alan D., The Lion Roars at Wembley, privately published by D.R. Knight, New Barnet, 1984. ISBN 0-9509251-0-1
- McKinnon, J.S., 'A Canadian's View of the Empire as Seen From London' in The Empire Club of Canada Speeches 1926 (The Empire Club of Canada, 1927) pp. 102–115
- Maxwell, Donald, Wembley in colour: being both an impression and a memento of the British Empire Exhibition of 1924 as seen by Donald Maxwell, Longmans, Green & Co., 1924
- Parsons, S.R., "The British Empire Exhibition: A Study in Geography, Resources, and Citizenship of the British Empire" in The Empire Club of Canada Speeches 1924 (The Empire Club of Canada, 1924) pp. 285–300
- Perkins, Mike & Tonkin, Bill, Postcards of the British Empire Exhibition Wembley 1924 and 1925, Exhibition Study Group, 1994 ISBN 0952406500
- Stephen, Daniel, 'Brothers of the Empire? India and the British Empire Exhibition of 1924-25' in Twentieth Century British History, Vol. 22, No. 2, 2011, pp. 164–188
- Stephen, Daniel, The Empire of Progress: West Africans, Indians, and Britons at the British Empire Exhibition, 1924–25, Palgrave Macmillan, 2013 ISBN 1137325119
- Stephen, Daniel, 'The White Man's Grave: the Gold Coast, Sierra Leone, and Nigeria at the British Empire Exhibition, 1924-1925' in Journal of British Studies 48 (1) (January 2009) pp. 102–128
- Walthew, K., 'The British Empire Exhibition of 1924' in History Today, Vol. 31 Issue 8 (August 1981) pp. 34–39
- Wembley History Society, The British Empire Exhibition, Wembley, 1924 : fiftieth anniversary, Wembley History Society, 1974
- Wembley History Society Journal: Special Edition 1974 - British Empire Exhibition 1924
- Woodham, J, "Images of Africa and Design at the British Empire Exhibitions between the Wars" in Journal of Design History, Vol. 2, No. 1 (1989), pp. 15–33
- Woolf, Virginia, "Thunder at Wembley" in The Captain's Death Bed and Other Essays (various editions)
