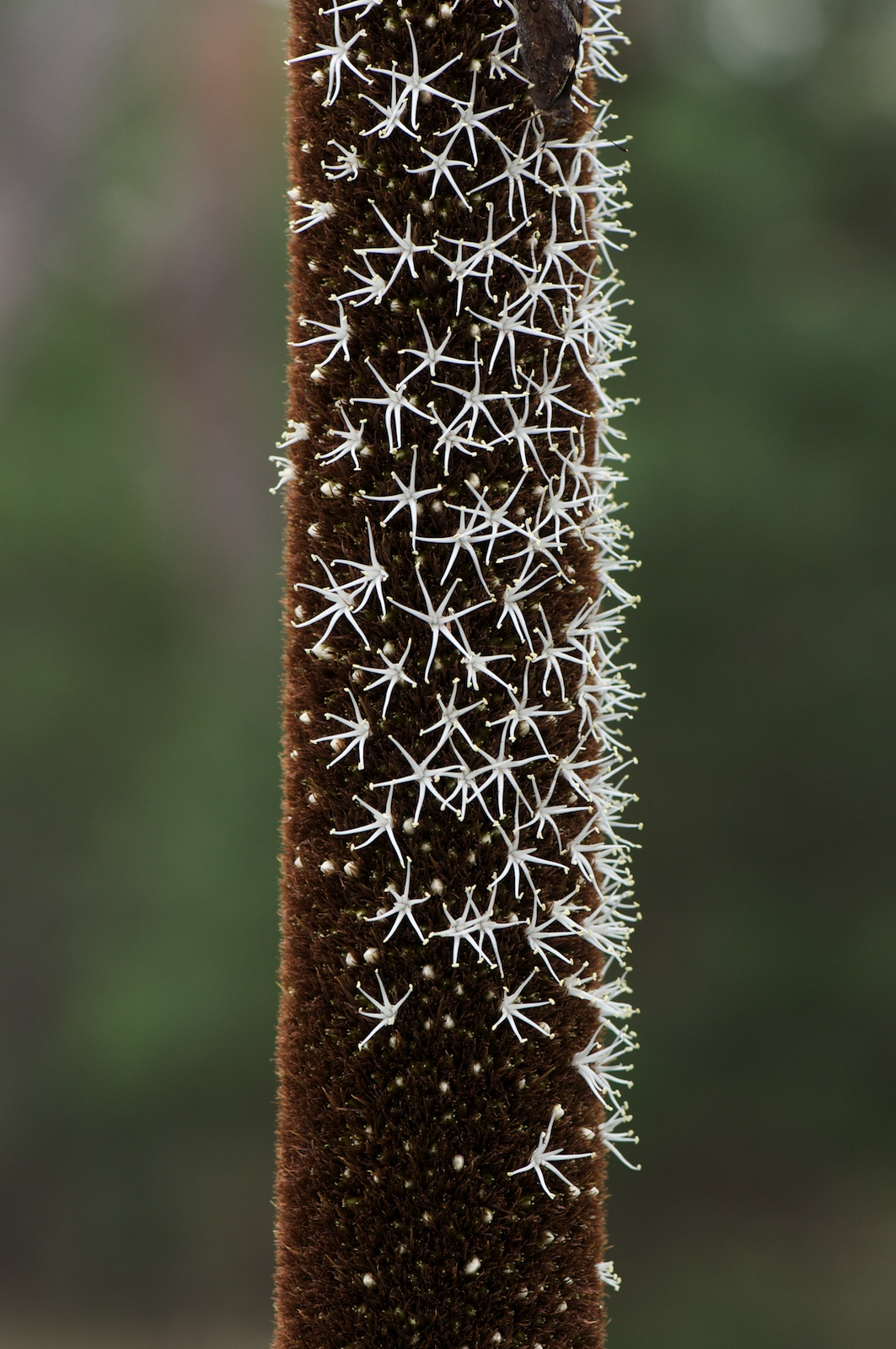
- The tree flowers after a fire in The Grampians, Victoria, Australia

Scientific classification
- Kingdom: Plantae
- Clade: Tracheophytes
- Clade: Angiosperms
- Clade: Monocots
- Order: Asparagales
- Family: Asphodelaceae
- Subfamily: Xanthorrhoeoideae
- Genus: Xanthorrhoea
- Species: X. australis

Binomial name
- Xanthorrhoea australis R.Br.

= Xanthorrhoea australis =

Species of plant

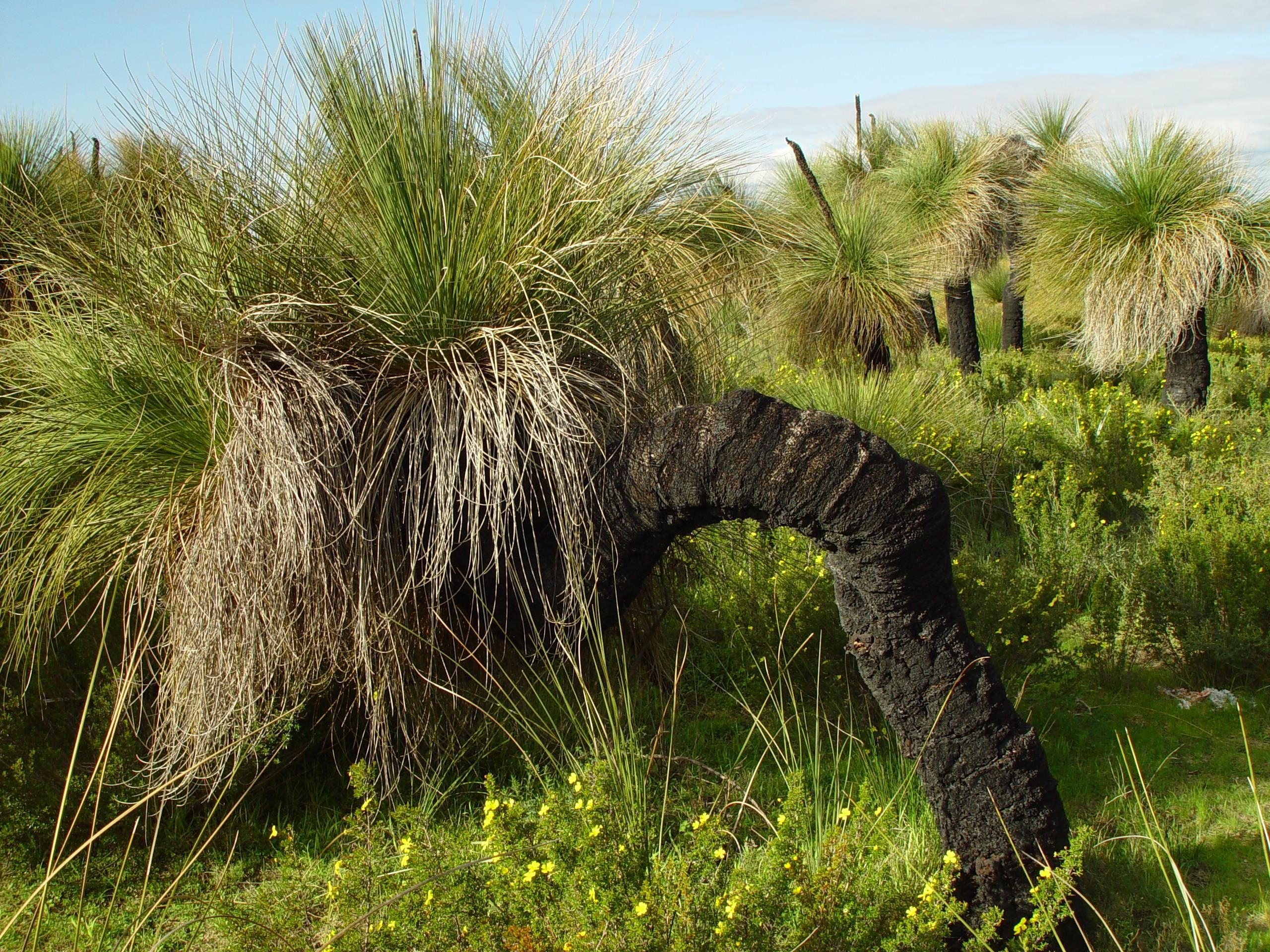

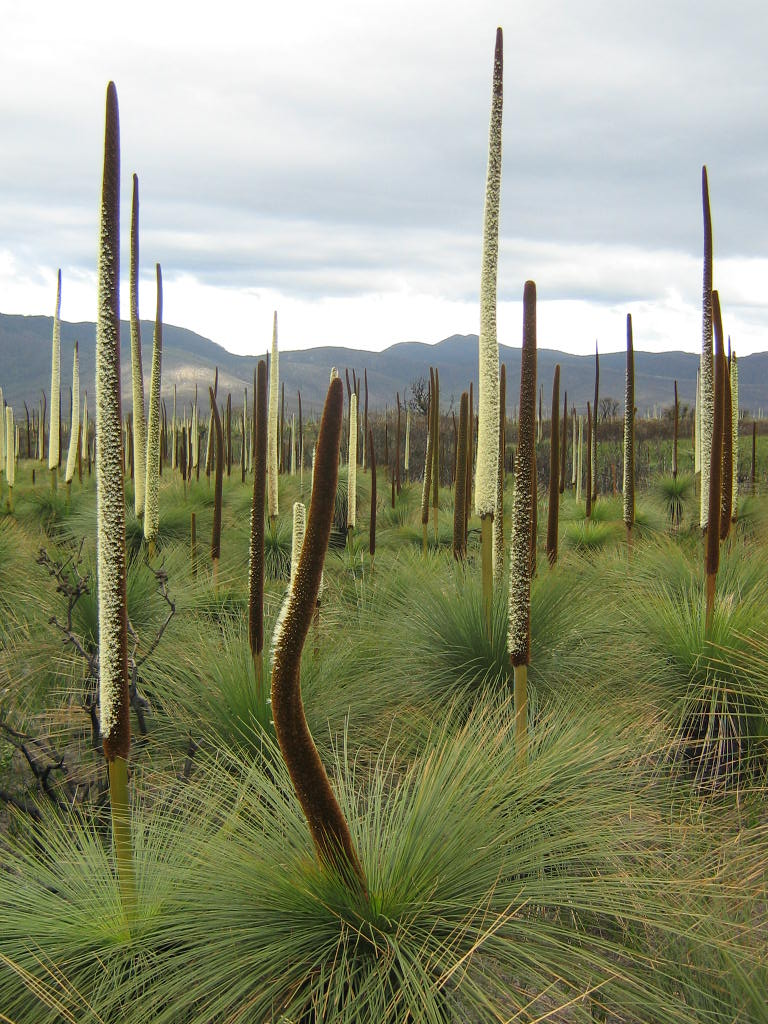
Grasstrees at Wilsons Promontory

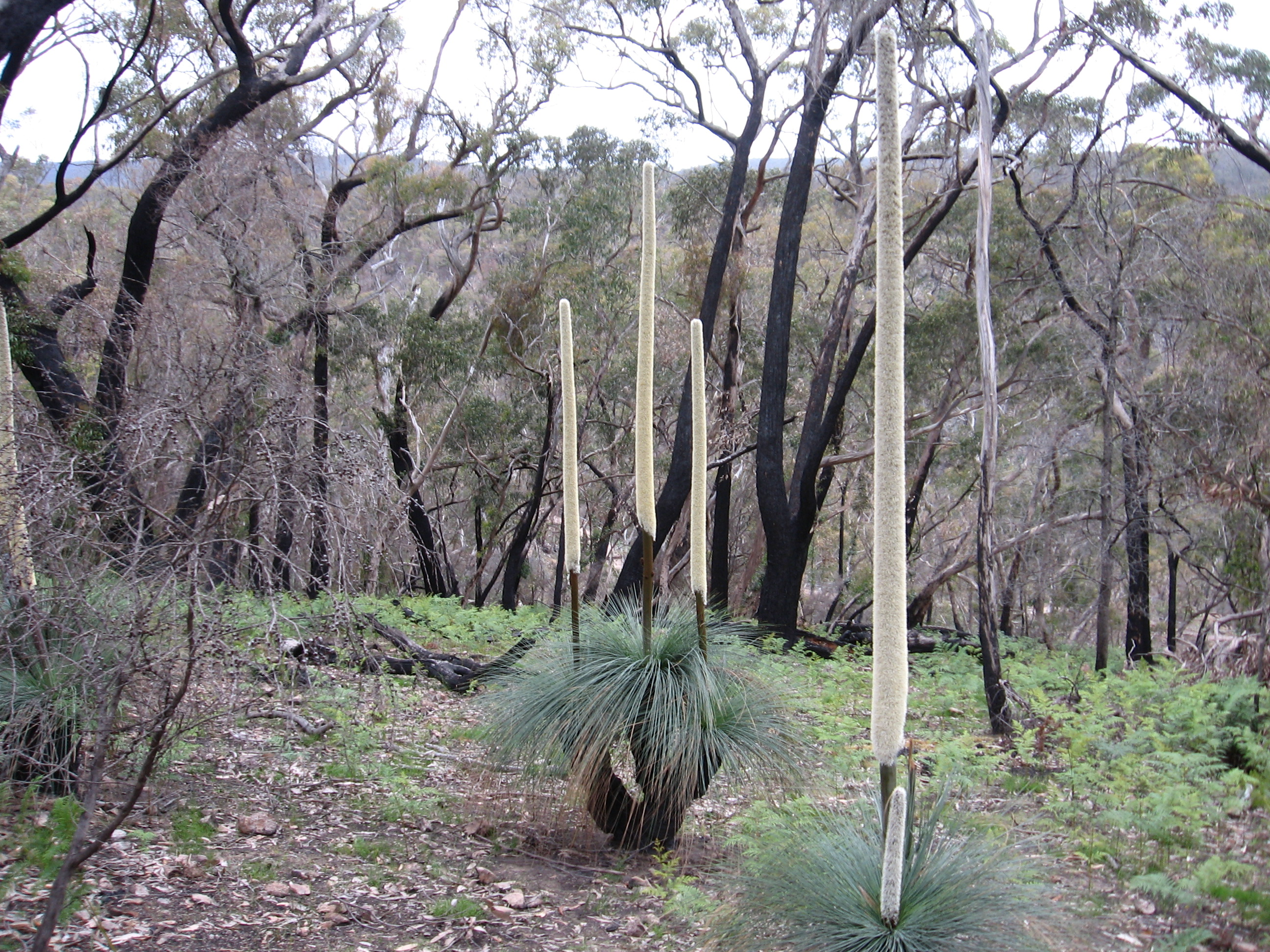

Xanthorrhoea australis, the grass tree or austral grasstree, is an Australian plant. It is the most commonly seen species of the genus Xanthorrhoea. Its trunk can grow up to several metres tall and is often branched. In certain Aboriginal languages, it is called bukkup, baggup or kawee.

== Description ==
The main way to identify Xanthorrhoea is by looking at the cross-section of the leaves. In the case of X. australis the cross-section is a rough diamond shape, and the colour of the leaves is a bluish-green.

The species usually develops a rough trunk which may be branched and coloured black, the result of bushfires. The trunk is able to grow up to over 3 metres (9.8 ft) in height with a width of up to 1 metre (3.3 ft) and may be branched. Three specimens at the Benvie Arboretum in KwaZulu Natal, South Africa are between 10.5–12 m (34–39 ft) in height. The bark is thick, rough and corky. The plant is very slow growing and trunks only start appearing after many years. The long, narrow leaves are crowded together at the tops of the trunks.

X. australis takes several years to flower, and it does not always flower annually, but in the season after a bushfire it flowers prolifically. The flowers appear on a spear-like spike which can grow up to 2 metres (6.6 ft) tall. The flowers, with 6 petals, usually cover 1/2–5/6 of the stem.

The crown of leaves is almost spherical in shape, the point of each leaf perfectly marking the shape of the imagined sphere. The leaves crown the trunk in a crowded whorl of long, wiry leaves. They are arranged in a spiral, forming an erect tuft when young and spreading as they mature, with the oldest leaves dying and forming a hanging skirt around the trunk. The blue-green needle-like leaves are typically 14 to 30 centimetres (5.5 to 11.8 in) long and have a waxy coating. The leaves are softer and generally less rigid than other Xanthorrhoeas. Old leaves hang down forming a distinctive skirt-like feature that partly covers the fire-blackened trunk. X. australis flowers from July to December, but younger plants may flower in June.

The common name grass tree is appropriate as the trunks and branches of the tree varieties are made out of the leaf bases, as upright grass branches are, not from wood.

Grass trees are often very long-lived with some estimated to be 350 to 450 years old.

== Taxonomy ==
The species was first formally described by the botanist Robert Brown in 1810 as part of the work Prodromus Florae Novae Hollandiae.

The genus name Xanthorrhoea is taken from the Greek words xanthos, meaning yellow, and rheo, meaning to flow, a reference to the resin that is obtained from these plants. The species epithet australis, meaning southern, refers to the distribution of the species.

== Distribution ==
This species can be found in the states of New South Wales, Australian Capital Territory, South Australia, Tasmania and Victoria. It is regarded as the most widely distributed species of the genus. It occurs on ancient, leached and nutrient-poor soils and is particularly sensitive to phosphorus, a common trait among Australian flora. It is also highly susceptible to the invasive soil-borne pathogen Phytophthora cinnamomi which causes dieback disease, or root rot.

== Uses ==
Indigenous Australians soaked the flowering spikes in water to produce a sweet drink. The soft, white leaf bases were eaten as well as the growing point of the stem. The flower spike exudes a resin which could be used as an adhesive in the manufacture of tools and the stem used for the lower portion of a spear. Stems were also used to make a base for a fire-drill to start a fire. The resin was also collected and sent to commercial processors where it was made into lacquer for furniture of cabinet makers. Dye maker and inventor Eady Hart was known to use grass trees to make fire starters as a way to supplement her pension.

In 1915 there was considerable consternation over the realisation that German agents had been buying “immense quantities of grass tree gum for the past quarter of a century”, presumably for the purpose of manufacturing explosives. The explosive containing grass tree resin was reported as more explosive than dynamite in experiments at the time.

== See also ==
- Grass Tree Conservation Park

== Bibliography ==
Australian Native Plants Society (Australia) (ANPSA)

Australian postage stamp featuring X. australis
