= Monumentalism =

Architectural tendency

Monumentalism is a term used in architectural and art history to describe a design approach or aesthetic style that emphasizes grandeur, colossal scale, durability, and potent symbolic significance. It is defined less by a specific historical period than by a recurring intention to evoke awe, project authority, and ensure the lasting memory of a culture, event, or political ideology. Characteristic features often include a simplified, austere aesthetic using strong symmetry, simple geometric volumes, and robust, permanent materials like stone or concrete, designed to create a powerful and unified visual impression that dominates the physical environment.

== Neo-Baroque ==
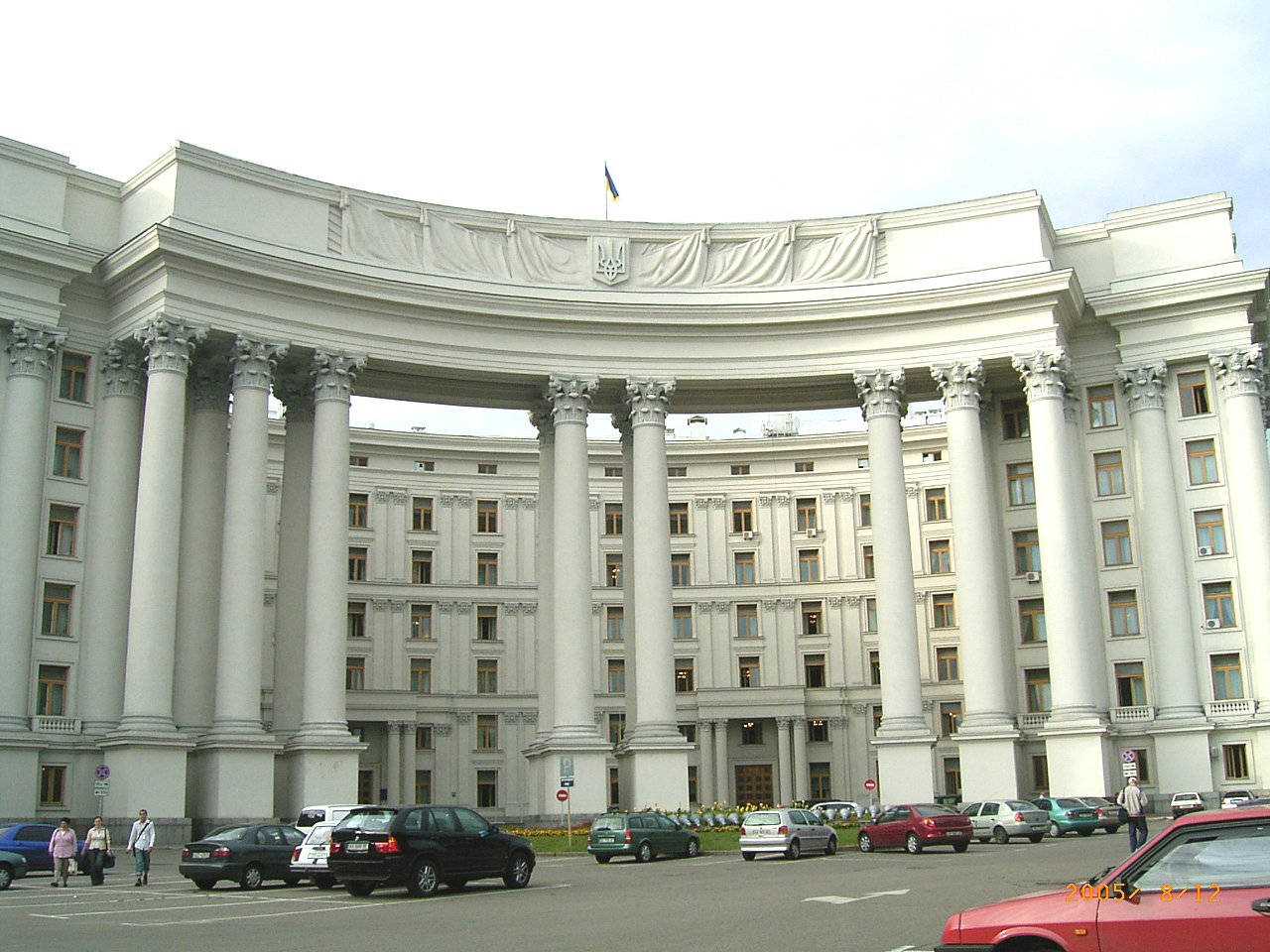
Former building of the Central Committee of the Communist Party in Kyiv

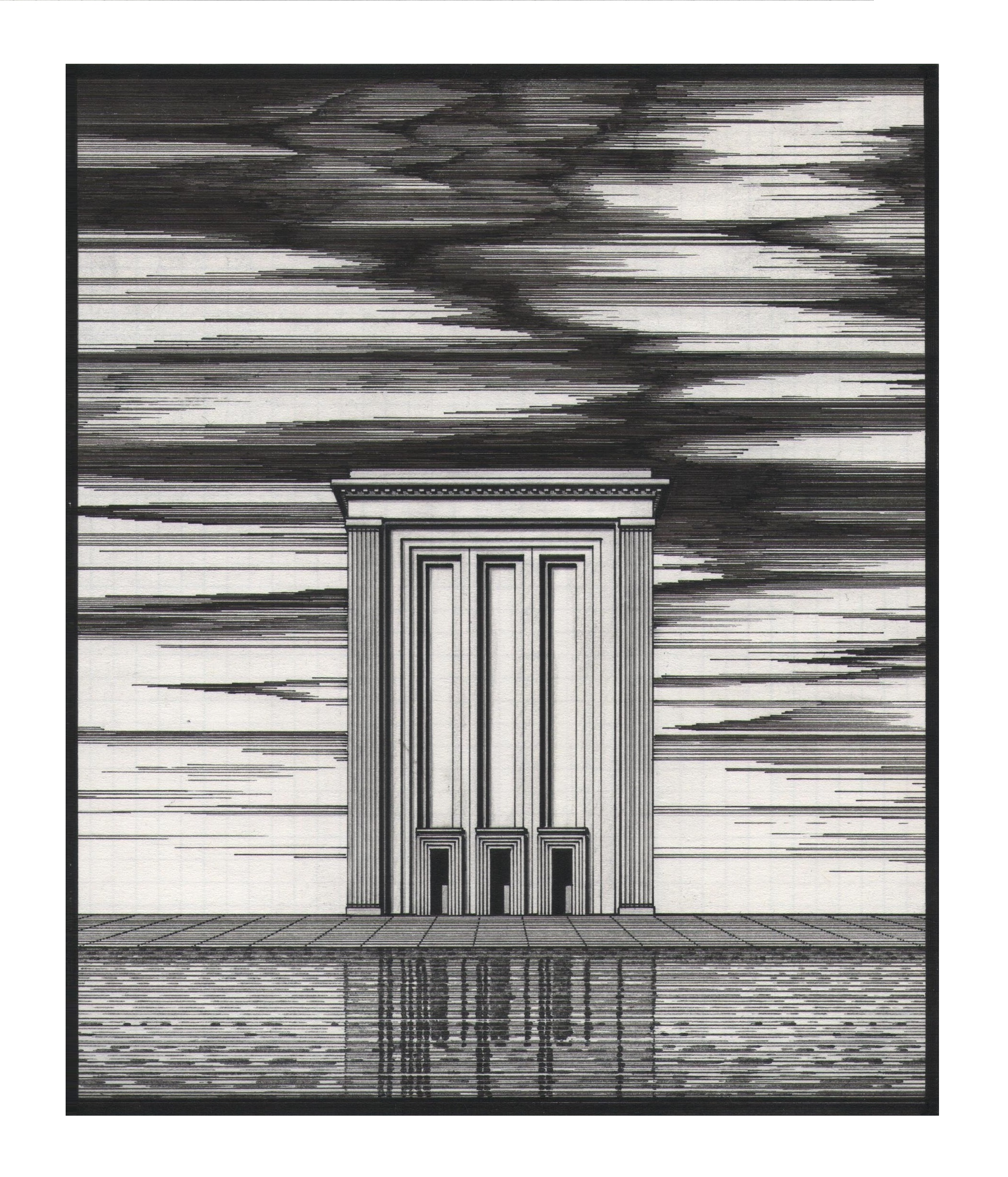
Arnaldo dell'Ira, Tempio degli Eroi

Neo-Baroque (Baroque Revival) shows a return to the eighteenth century with the proportion of orders becoming gigantic, enriched with ornamental friezes. It is the public architecture of the Soviet Union with the various buildings of the central party committees in Leningrad as in Kiev. The scenographic vision of the architectural space, which is to celebrate the regime, takes over on the planimetric composition of the buildings.

== Simplified Neoclassicism ==
Simplified Neoclassicism, also called Novecento Italiano style, is linked to the classical architectural culture, but lightens its elements and architectural details, removing or simplifying the decoration. This is the architecture preferred by totalitarian regimes for its celebratory efficacy in the built environment, with the exaltation of the Roman age in the Italian case. Its major theorist will be in Italy the architect Marcello Piacentini who dominates the fascist twenty years with his canons, crowding out the rationalists, who attempted to reconcile the themes of the Modern Movement within an authoritarian regime. This style also affected new urbanistic projects (university city of Rome, E42) and the demolition and reconstruction of historic centers (Via della Conciliazione, historic centers of Brescia and Livorno).

Piacentini will develop two essential canons: the exterior modernization of the style and the classic structure of the architectural design, with:

- the elementaryization of the architectural details; smooth walls, full balconies, flattened frames, lightened capitals, elementary arches, beveled columns, which must remind the Mediterranean Sea and past "Roman times", also adopting specific materials such as marble;
- an empty neoclassical architectural space with symmetrical and blocked plans, closed volumes, gigantism of proportions, exaltation of the overall scenographic vision.

== Links with the Modern Movement ==
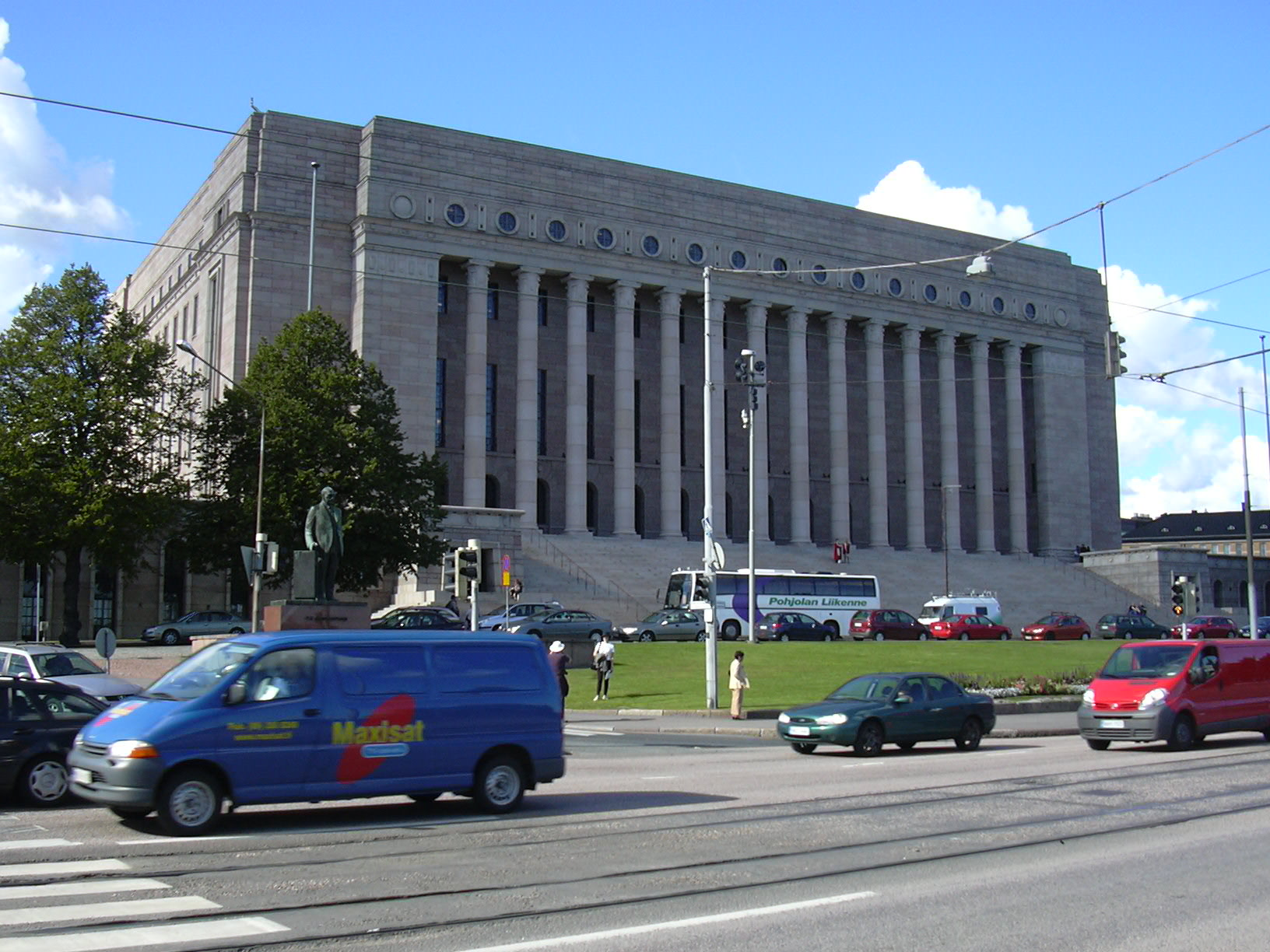
Eduskuntatalo building in Helsinki (1927–1931)

Some scholars identify traits that of the Novecento Italiano in architects who straddle the nineteenth-century language and the Modern Movement, as in the last works of Auguste Perret, where the features are however much more sober and somehow refer to the classical French tradition, as in the Public Works Museum of 1937. Other examples are found in the so-called Nordic Classicism and with some constructions by the Swedish architect Gunnar Asplund, who for some in the Stockholm Crematorium 1935–40 achieves a balance between modern forms and monumentalism in an ideal of synthesis with the languages of the past classical tradition.

Some include in monumentalism, even if in part, the so-called metaphysical architecture of interwar Italy, typical of which some fascist-era cities of foundation such as Portolago (on the Greek island of Leros) or Sabaudia. This, however, seems more related to the themes of the Modern Movement in its specification and Italian characteristic (Italian Rationalism), defining the two cities described above as rare examples, although unknown as regards the first, of the International Style.

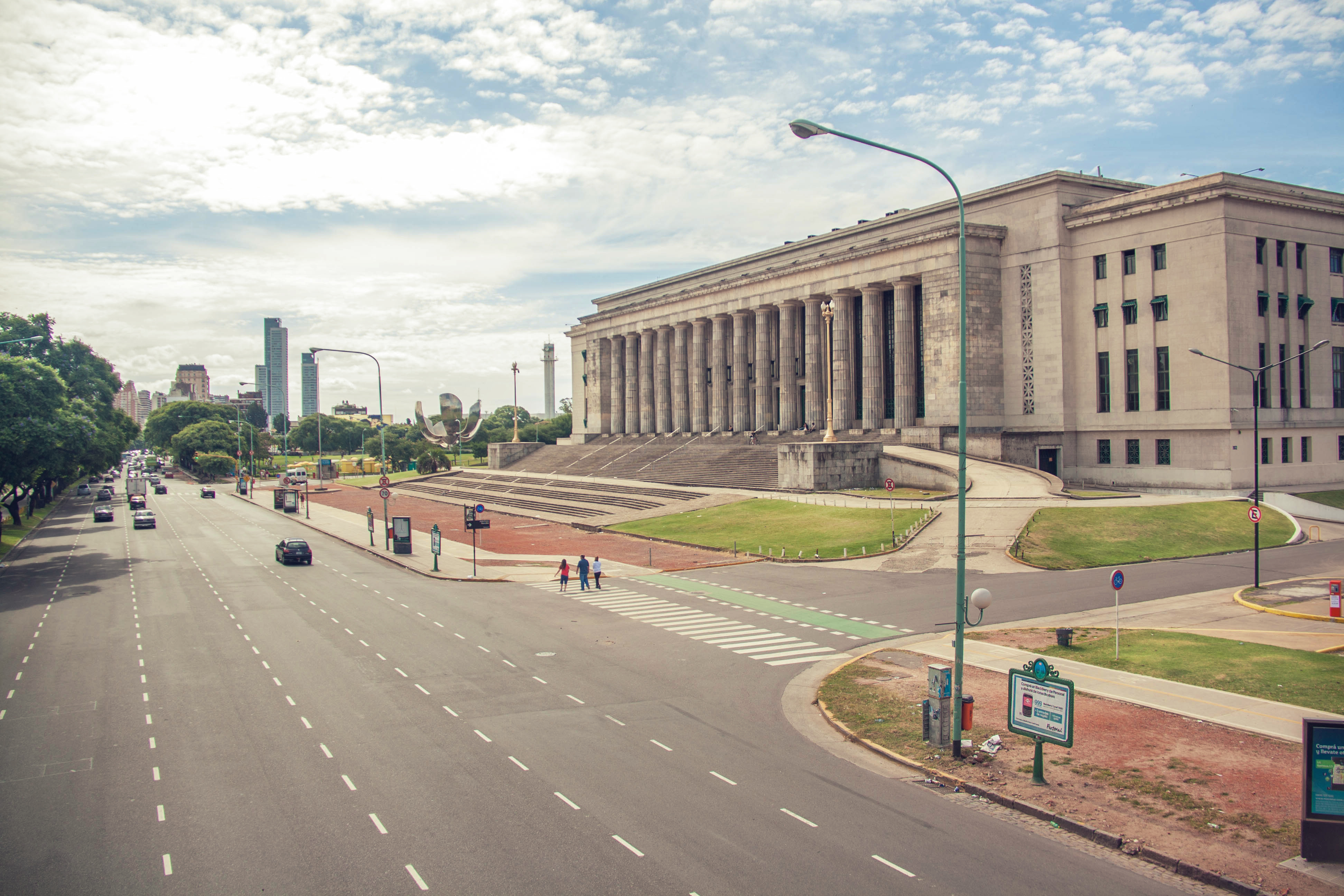
Faculty of Law of the University of Buenos Aires, Argentina

Some critics go even further, including in Monumentalism part of some architectural expressions of the Modern Movement, when they concerned a search for symmetry, perfect, repetitive and monumental rhythm, as in the works of Mies van der Rohe, of which the Seagram Building it is the most complete expression. Also in some works by Giuseppe Terragni the primordial forms of Monumentalism such as the cubic, monolithic and strongly symbolic volumes are found. Moreover, the Casa del Fascio of Como, one of the masterpieces of Italian Rationalism, is designed on the golden section and built on symmetrical balances. However, these buildings belonging to the Modern Movement have different articulations in plan in relation to the functional distribution, which is less found in decidedly monumental constructions; in them the architectural space is closely linked to the relationship between form and function, which is the first and essential characteristic of the rationalistic theme.

== Related pages ==
- Fascist architecture
- Stripped Classicism
