= LDO =

LDO may refer to:

- Limited duty officer, a US naval rôle
- Low-dropout regulator, in electronics
- London Designer Outlet, a shopping centre in London
