= Olympic Way =

Road between Wembley Park tube station and Wembley Stadium

Coordinates: 51°33′36″N 0°16′47″W

Olympic Way, often incorrectly known as Wembley Way, is the road that links Wembley Park tube station and Wembley Stadium in Wembley Park, London, England. Thousands of spectators walk along it to every event as the road leads directly into the stadium. The road is an easy access from the London Underground system at Wembley Park to the stadium, and travels in a north–south direction. The road also allows pedestrians an easy access to London Designer Outlet from the station.

The road was constructed for the 1948 Olympic Games, held at Wembley Stadium. Wembley's owners discussed plans for improved access to the site with London Transport, Wembley Council and the Ministry of Transport, and were willing to build and pay for a new £120,000 access road. Work started on the new road in mid 1947 and the 500 yard long and 45 feet wide carriageway was completed ahead of the 1948 summer games.

Olympic Way was constructed partially by German prisoners of war still in the United Kingdom. Originally they were intended to be used for picking up refuse during the 1948 Summer Olympics, but their duties were changed due to criticism in the press; one media outlet stated that "It is fair to assume that the Ministry of Labour will think very hard before intending for a slave squad to operate quite so publicly and before quite so many overseas visitors." As a result of a labour shortage, German prisoners of war were used in constructing Olympic Way instead.

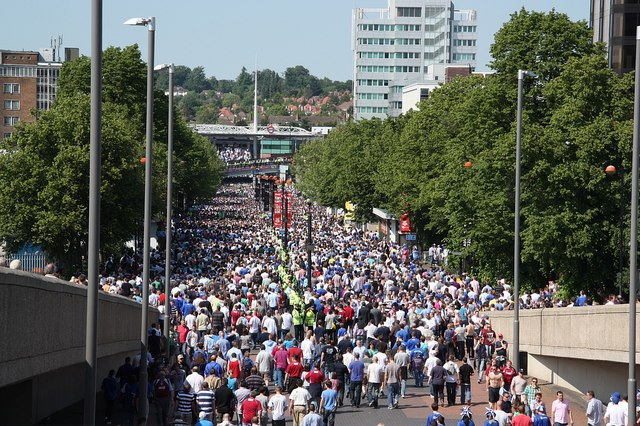
Olympic Way looking down from the Wembley Stadium

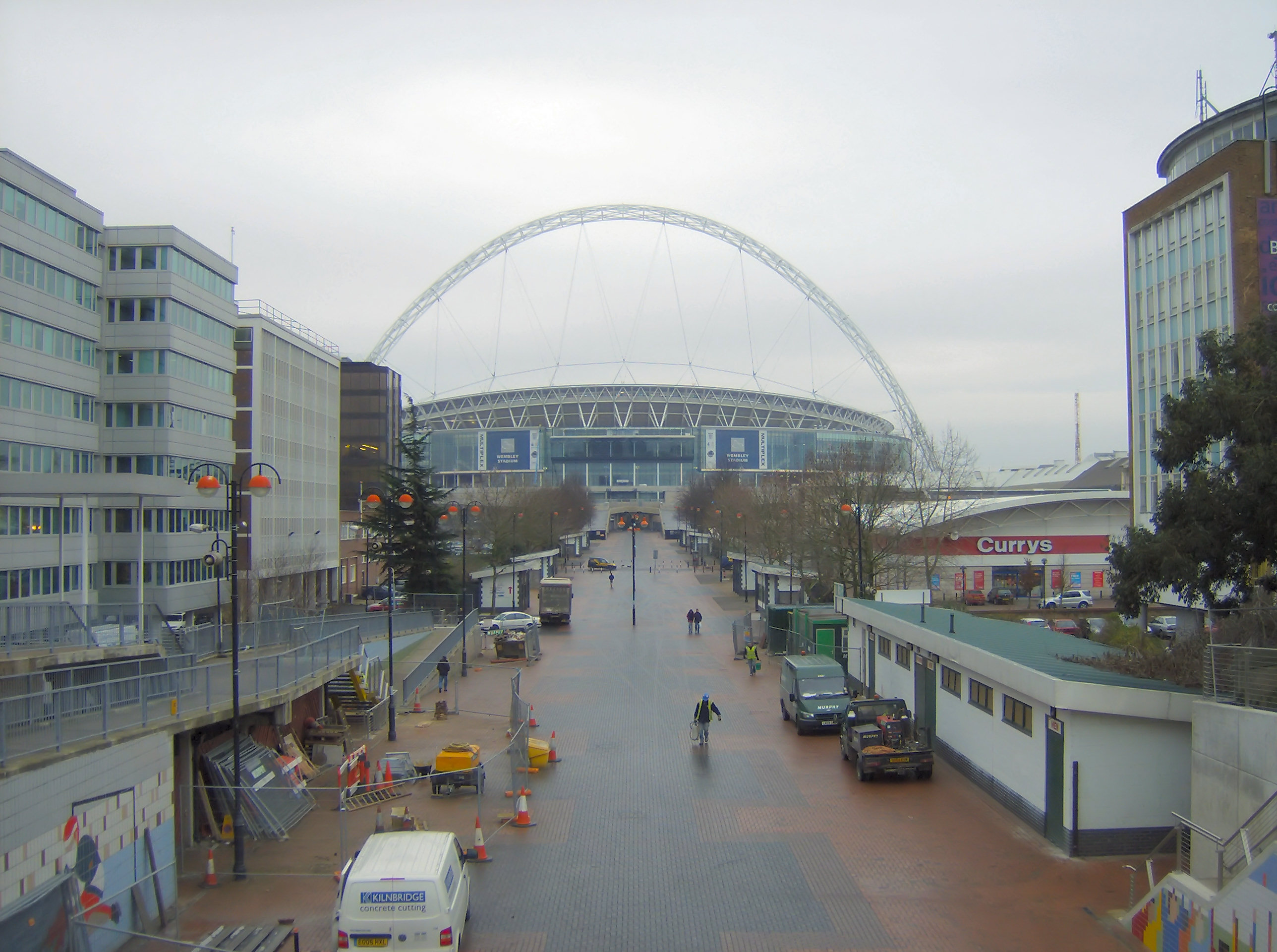
New Wembley Stadium looking south, down the new Olympic Way, January 2007

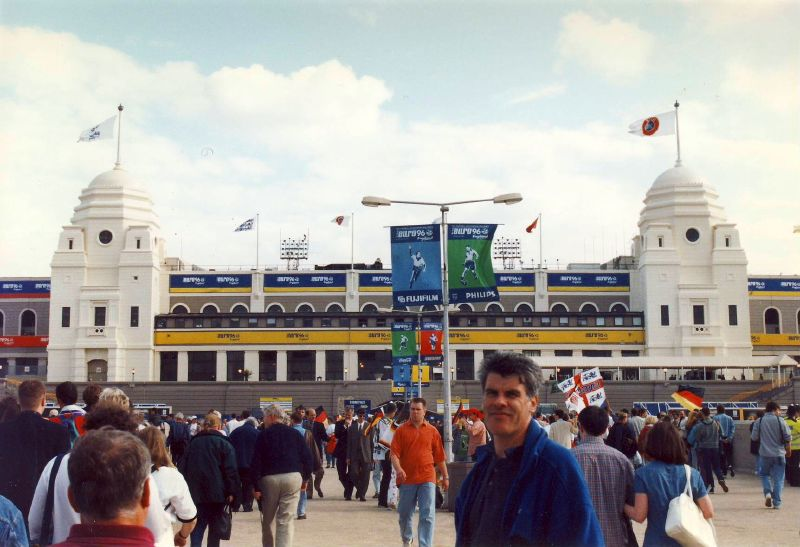
Olympic Way before the Germany v England semi-final at Euro 96

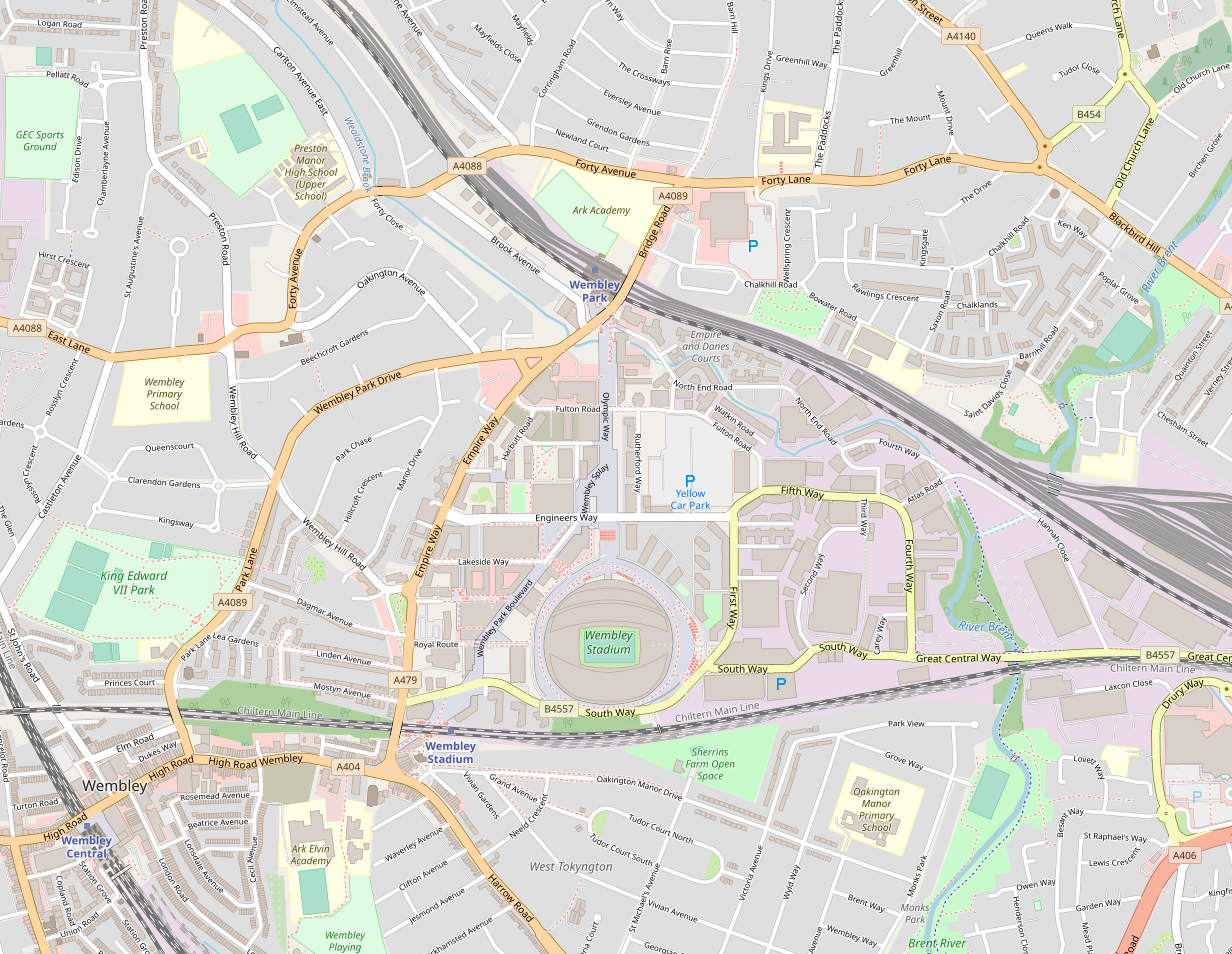
A map of Wembley Stadium in relation to Olympic Way

It was pedestrianised by Brent Council before the Euro 96 football tournament matches at Wembley.
