= White Horse Bridge =

Footbridge in Wembley Park, England

Coordinates: 51.554282°N 0.285577°W

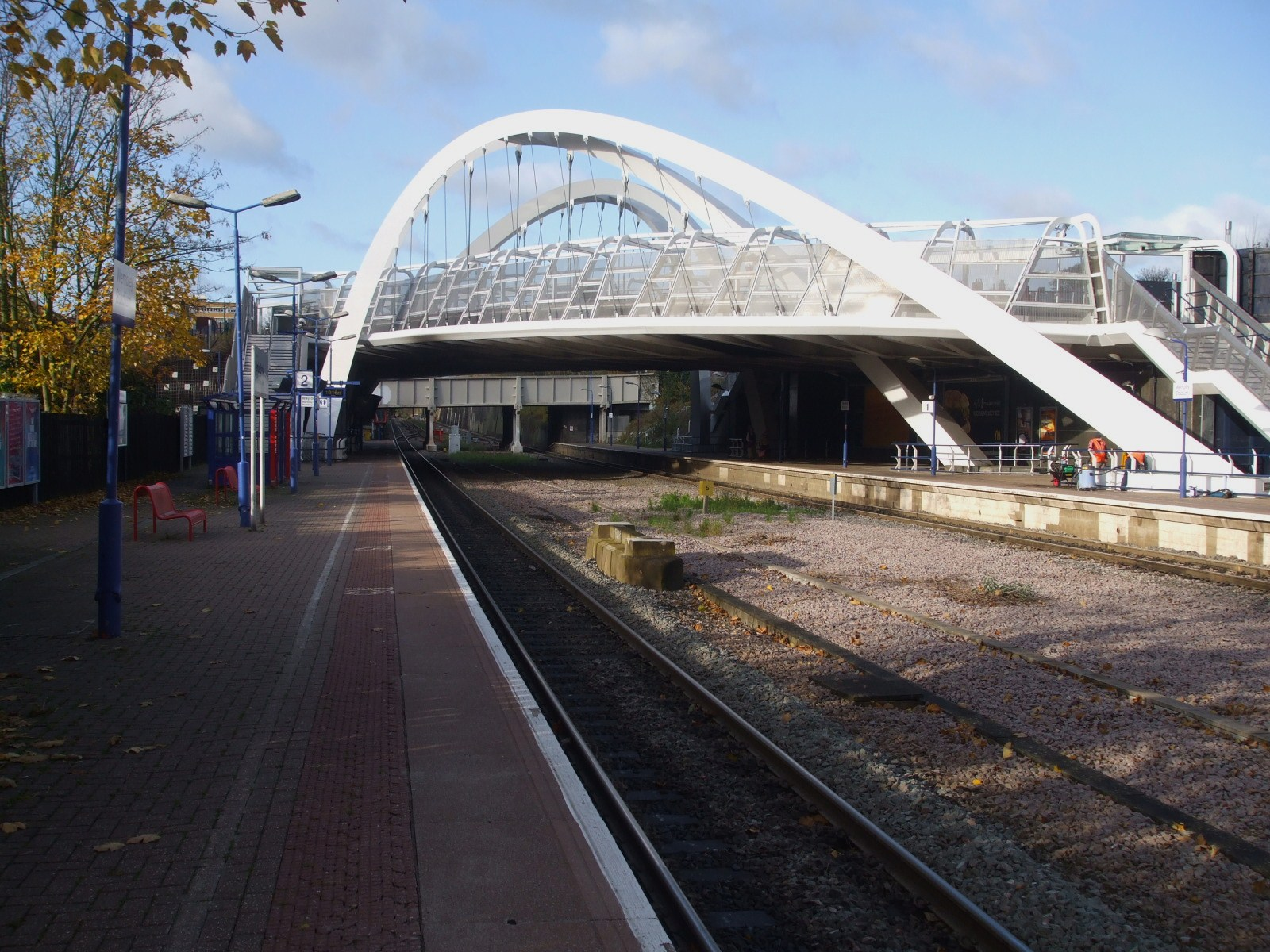
Wembley Stadium station with the White Horse Bridge built across it

The White Horse Bridge is a footbridge that crosses the tracks at Wembley Stadium railway station leading up to Wembley Stadium in Wembley Park, England. It was designed by Steve Chilton for architects Marks Barfield and engineered by Halcrow. It replaced an old concrete footbridge which was probably built for the British Empire Exhibition. The project also included the construction of a public square.

The bridge's name was chosen in May 2005 after a BBC Radio 5 Live poll. It is named after a Metropolitan Police horse named 'Billy', that was used to restore order after the huge numbers of spectators (estimated at between 200,000 and 300,000) who turned up to witness the 1923 FA Cup Final, the first to be held at the old Wembley Stadium, spilled onto the pitch before kick off. Although grey in colour, the horse appears as white in contemporary black-and-white photographs and films.

Unlike the old footbridge, the new structure was designed to cope with up to 12,000 people an hour, the estimated number of users during match days. The bridge and square opened in 2008. They now give easy access from the Chiltern Line to London Designer Outlet.

== Naming ==
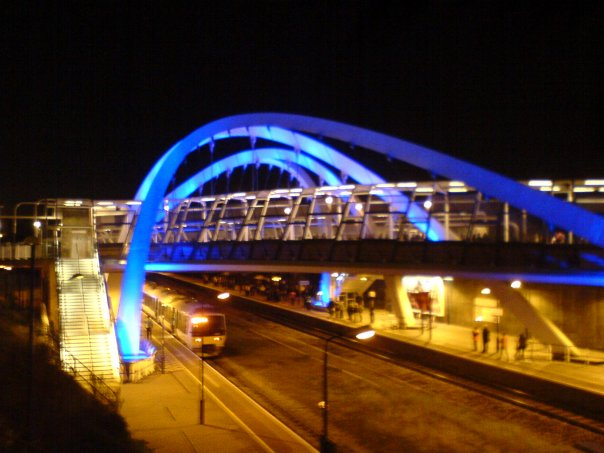
The White Horse Bridge at night

In May 2005, the name was decided in an online poll hosted by BBC Five Live in conjunction with the London Development Agency (who were building the bridge and who had conceived the idea of a public poll). It was the winning name from a shortlist of Live Aid (in memory of the 1985 concert held at the stadium), Alf Ramsey (England's 1966 World Cup-winning manager), Bobby Charlton and Geoff Hurst (two of Ramsey's team).

The LDA received over 670,000 nominations from all over the world. The name with the most nominations, however, mainly coming from Germany, was Dietmar Hamann, who scored the last goal at the old Wembley Stadium. This was a qualification game in October 2000 for the 2002 FIFA World Cup, with a German 1–0 win against England. The LDA decided to name the bridge White Horse Bridge instead.

== See also ==
- List of bridges in London
