= Brent Town Hall =

Municipal building in London, England

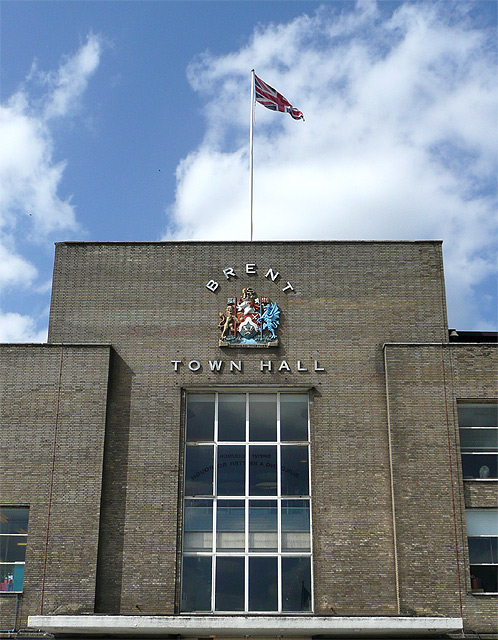
- Brent Town Hall in 2008, prior to being vacated by the council

- Shown in Brent
- 51°33′58″N 0°16′25″W
- Location: 54 Forty Lane, Wembley Park HA9 9HD, Brent

History
- Built: 1940; 86 years ago

Site notes
- Architect: Clifford Strange
- Architectural style: Modern style
- Website: lyceeinternational.london

Listed Building – Grade II
- Designated: 24 September 1990; 36 years ago
- Reference no.: 1262141

Brent Town Hall, formerly Wembley Town Hall, is a landmark building in Wembley Park in the London Borough of Brent, northwest London, England. The building is T-shaped, with a long façade on Forty Lane. The building was the seat of Brent London Borough Council until 2013 and is now occupied by the Lycée International de Londres Winston Churchill. It is a Grade II listed building.

== History ==
The building was commissioned by the Municipal Borough of Wembley to replace their aging council offices in High Road, Wembley. The site selected for the new building was some open land known as "The Paddocks".

The foundation stone for the new building was laid by Alderman Herbert Gauntlett on 9 October 1937. The new building was designed by Clifford Strange, a former student of Thomas S. Tait who had been influenced in his work by the Dutch architect Willem Marinus Dudok. The building, which was even fitted with a bomb-proof first-aid post, was opened as Wembley Town Hall in 1940. The main frontage featured a central tower with a doorway and canopy on the ground floor, a tall window on the first and second floors and the borough coat of arms above. Internally, the principal rooms were the assembly hall and the council chamber, both located on the first floor.

In September 1943, during the Second World War, a ceremony was held at the town hall, attended by the former Prime Minister of Canada, Viscount Bennett, to commemorate the borough's fund raising achievements during Wings for Victory Week. In 1951, Pevsner described the town hall as "the best of the modern town halls around London, neither fanciful nor drab". It has also been described as "an English interpretation of Modernism", using brick rather than concrete.

The building was the headquarters of the Municipal Borough of Wembley for much of the 20th century and it remained the local seat of government as "Brent Town Hall", after Wembley amalgamated with Willesden to form the London Borough of Brent in April 1965. The building continued to serve as an events and concert venue and performers included the band The Who, also in April 1965.

In 2009 the council tried unsuccessfully to have the building delisted to facilitate redevelopment of the site. After the council relocated to the new Brent Civic Centre in August 2013, the town hall was sold to The French Education Property Trust which transformed it into an international French school called the Lycée International de Londres Winston Churchill, which opened in September 2015.
