= Arthur Elvin =

British businessman

Sir Arthur Elvin MBE (5 July 1899 – 4 February 1957) was a British businessman who was best known as the owner and operator of Wembley Stadium, London, and supporter of the 1948 Olympic Games. He is credited with saving Wembley Stadium from closure and demolition by introducing greyhound racing to the stadium in 1927, which paid off his loans.

== Life ==
The son of a Norwich policeman, he was born in Magpie Road, Norwich. Elvin left school at the age of fourteen. After a few different jobs, including as a soap salesman in Aldgate, he joined the Royal Flying Corps (RFC) during the First World War, aged 17.

Arthur Elvin (center) in POW camp 1918

Flying as an observer, Elvin was shot down over France and was held as a prisoner of war for six months, despite at least one escape attempt. He later said that one of the reasons for his recapture was that he could not swim, and that this had made him determined to construct a public swimming pool. After the war Elvin was employed by the Ministry of Munitions to salvage the metal in artillery shells in France, supervising, in his words, "hundreds of workmen of all nationalities."

Back in England, Elvin ran out of money and in 1924 was offered a job working in a cigarette kiosk at the British Empire Exhibition at Wembley Park, Wembley, by a charity for distressed ex-officers. Working at the Exhibition changed Elvin's life.

Elvin died at sea in 1957 whilst on a trip to South Africa and was buried at sea. Despite his success he never lost his Norwich accent.

Between 1976 and 2006, his name was commemorated through the naming of Elvin House, a futuristic triangular office block in Wembley.

== Wembley Stadium ==
After working in a British Empire Exhibition cigarette kiosk in 1924, in 1925 Elvin decided to buy his own shops within the grounds. He procured eight for a total of £100. By the end of the Exhibition he had made over £1000 profit from his shops. He also met his future wife at the Exhibition. She was Jennie Harding, who was managing the jewellery section of the Palace of Industry.

No one had planned what to do with the Exhibition buildings after the Exhibition was over. After it closed a buildings entrepreneur and gambler called James White bought the buildings as a job lot for £300,000 and contracted Elvin to clear the site. Elvin bought the derelict buildings one by one and sold off the scrap. He also sold and moved entire structures elsewhere (for example, the Sierra Leone pavilion became a restaurant in Tranmore, County Waterford, and the New Zealand pavilion became a dance hall in London).

Most importantly, Elvin saw potential in the Empire Stadium. The Stadium went into liquidation at the end of the Exhibition after it was pronounced "financially unviable". The original plan was to demolish the stadium at the end of the Exhibition, but it was saved at the suggestion of Sir James Stevenson, a Scot who was chairman of the organising committee for the Empire Exhibition.

In 1927 Elvin offered White £122,500 for the Stadium, using a £12,000 downpayment and the balance plus interest payable over ten years. White accepted, taking payment in ten yearly instalments, but he was on the verge of bankruptcy and committed suicide on 29 June. Elvin had to raise £150,000 within two weeks for the sale to go ahead. To do this he relied on greyhound racing, a recent import from the United States that was doing well in Manchester and at the White City. Elvin asked Owen Williams if the stadium could be adapted for the new sport. On being told it could, he formed the Wembley Stadium and Greyhound Racecourse Company, which later became Wembley Stadium Limited. Elvin held the largest stake in the company, and became chairman.

Elvin retained the stadium's connection with the Football Association, giving English football a permanent home. The FA Cup Final was played every year, and home internationals (the first had been England v. Scotland on 12 April 1924, a 1 – 1 draw as well. England would not play a true international at Wembley until 1945, when they drew 2 – 2 with France.

The saving of the Stadium by Elvin ensured that Wembley Park would remain a visitor attraction, as it had been since Sir Edward Watkin had set up a pleasure ground there in the 1890s. Had the Stadium been demolished there is no certainty that the district would not have become permanently light industrial, or become wholly residential.

== Wembley Arena ==
Elvin claimed that he wanted to build a public swimming pool because his inability to swim having hindered his escape while a prisoner of war. In addition, in 1932 Elvin watched an England-Canada ice hockey match, probably at the Grosvenor House Hotel. He immediately saw the possibilities of the sport and resolved to build a new indoor Olympic-sized swimming pool that could be converted into an ice rink as well as being used for other indoor activities. These influences, along with the need for a new indoor multipurpose sports arena for the 1934 British Empire Games, inspired the construction of the Empire Pool.

The new building was designed by the engineer Sir Owen Williams, without the employment of an architect. Williams built a unique structure, with cantilevers meeting in the middle, thus avoiding the need for internal pillars. He also used high quality concrete, meaning that it has aged far better than many more recent concrete buildings.

Work on the Empire Pool began in November 1933, and it opened on 25 July 1934. At the time it had the largest span of any similar structure in the world. As with the Stadium, construction was supervised by R.J. Fowler, Wembley's chief building inspector.

The Empire Pool could hold 4,500 spectators, with the possibility of up to 12,500 using temporary seating. Elvin's aim was for it to become "London's greatest pleasure resort," hosting a wide variety of events. It also provided two year-round covered public swimming pools (the main pool and a 40-foot paddling pool), making it, as one publication called it, "The World's Largest Covered Bath." During the day natural light poured into the building through enormous windows at the east and west ends and in the roof.

Elvin introduced ice hockey to the new Empire Pool in October 1934.

On 1 February 1978 the Empire Pool was renamed Wembley Arena. In 2013 the US live music company AEG took over Wembley Arena and a year later they signed a 10-year naming-rights and sponsorship deal with the energy company SSE (formerly Scottish Southern Electric) to help fund this. Wembley Arena was renamed The SSE Arena, Wembley, on 1 June 2014.

== Greyhound racing ==
The first sport Elvin introduced to the stadium was greyhound racing. Elvin had noted the popularity and success of greyhound racing at the Bellevue race track in Manchester and recognised the sport as a good business proposition. The opening meeting was in 1927 and 50,000 people attended to watch the first race won by a greyhound named Spin. The dog racing provided the stadium with its main source of regular income, especially in the early days, and continued to attract crowds of several thousand up until the early 1960s.

== Speedway ==
In 1929 Elvin decided he wanted to operate a speedway team from the stadium. With the help of speedway promoter Johnnie Hoskins, he constructed a speedway track at a cost of £250,000. The first speedway race at Wembley took place on 16 May 1929. Elvin announced that the Wembley Lions would enter the new Southern League.

The ashes for the speedway track were supplied by Richard Biffa Ltd, whose operating base at the time was in Wembley Hill Road. Richard Biffa later became Biffa Waste Services.

The Wembley Lions speedway team became one of the most successful in the country, with large attendances and some 60,000 fans in their supporters' club.

The Speedway World Championship was held at Wembley Stadium from 1936 until 1960 and then seven times more afterwards. Training events occurred in the Stadium car park, and indoor events were held in the Empire Pool.

In 1957, the Lions withdrew from the league before the season started due to Elvin's death, only to return in 1970.

The stadium saw a crowd of 85,000 for the first World Final in 1936 while the largest crowd was for the 1981 World Final on 5 September 1981, when some 92,500 saw the last final held at the great stadium. For many years after the war it was said that without the huge speedway crowds the stadium itself would have gone under. Speedway was Elvin's sporting love, and for one Lions' league meeting in 1948, against the West Ham Hammers, it witnessed a crowd of 85,000 inside and another 20,000 outside unable to get in.

== Ice hockey ==
Elvin introduced ice hockey to the new Empire Pool in October 1934. There were two teams, the new Wembley Lions and the Wembley Canadians (later the Wembley Monarchs), who had previously, as the Grosvenor House Canadians, been connected with the rink at the Grosvenor House Hotel.

The success of ice hockey at Wembley may have been helped by the fact that the season began just as the speedway season ended, encouraging speedway supporters to follow the new sport over the winter. Matches were played on Thursdays and Saturdays. 343,530 people watched ice hockey at Wembley in 1936. The Wembley Canadians became the Wembley Monarchs in 1936 and played until 1950. The Wembley Lions continued to exist until 1968.

In 1990 Elvin was inducted into the British Ice Hockey Hall of Fame.

== Rugby League ==
From 1929, Elvin began hosting the Rugby League Challenge Cup Final at Wembley. It had previously been played in the North. It continues to be played in the new stadium today.

== Second World War ==
During the Second World War, Elvin offered free admission to servicemen and servicewomen, and helped war charities. He also encouraged mass PT events in the Empire Pool on Thursday evenings, Saturday afternoons and Sunday mornings, and opened a gymnasium for cadets of the Middlesex Regiment.

== 1948 London Olympics ==
Arthur Elvin supplied the Wembley site free of charge for the 1948 London Olympics. Some of the old British Empire Exhibition buildings were used, notably the Palace of Engineering, so no new venues were needed, though Olympic Way was built at a cost of £120,000.

== Honours ==
Arthur Elvin was made a Member of the Order of the British Empire in 1945 and received his knighthood from King George VI in 1947.
