= Walturdaw Company Limited =

Early 20th century British manufacturer of film and cameras and maker of films

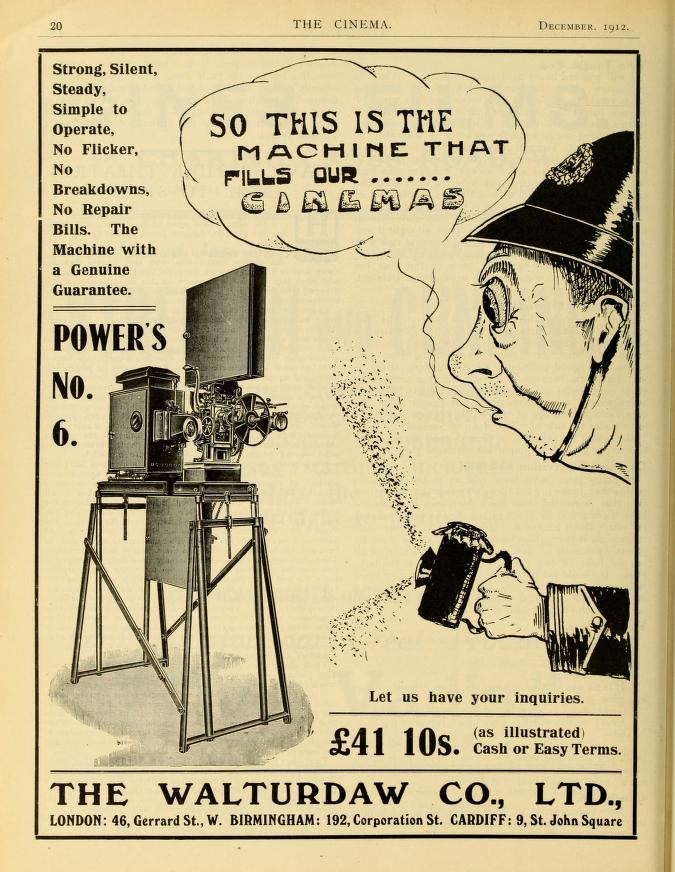
A film projector advertisement (1912)

The Walturdaw Company Limited was a British film company in the early 20th century. They manufactured film cameras and projectors, as well as published their own films, some 189 films were made.

== History ==
The name comes from a conflation of the surnames of the company's founders, J.D. Walker, Edward George Turner, and G.H. Dawson.

The company manufactured film cameras and projectors, as well as dealing in a wide variety of equipment relevant to the "kinematograph industry" and distributing and producing films.

According to IMDb, Walturdaw started making films in 1901, their first being The Life and Death of Queen Victoria. However, the BFI suggests they only started making films in 1903. It appears that the company began trading in 1904. According to the Colonial Film: Moving Images of the British Empire website Walturdaw was considered to be one of the leading British firms before 1914. Walturdaw was the sales agent for a number of continental film companies, including German, Hungarian, Italian and Russian ones. At various times they had offices at 3 Dean Street and at various addresses in Gerrard Street, both in Soho.

In 1907 the company introduced their own synchronised sound film system, the Cinematophone.

In total Walturdaw made some 189 films. A number of these films were made in a studio in Sir Edward Watkin's pleasure grounds at Wembley Park, north-west London, after Walturdaw took over and adapted the old Variety Hall, a large wooden variety theatre, there in 1907. Others, such as The Lusitania at Liverpool (1907), were presumably filmed outdoors.

E.G. Turner later wrote “we were buyers and sellers of everything in the kinematograph Industry, new or secondhand. There was one member, however, whose inclinations were photographically inclined, and so we took lease of Wembley Park and erected there something novel in the way of outdoor studios – a revolving platform, which allowed us to put up three sets of scenery at a time, when the wind allowed it, and each could be brought to the camera as required. Further, it was so constructed that we could always get the best of the light and sunshine. Ernest Howard took charge of this department – his lieutenants being J.B. McDowell and E. Bloomfield – these latter were our cameramen.”

The company made a net profit of £1,160/0/8d in 1911 to 1912, but although profits continued in the first years of the First World War it made a net loss in 1916.

There were various legal problems about Walturdaw’s licence, but they kept the studio until January 1911, when it was seriously damaged in a fire. Walturdaw stopped making films in the same year, but they continued as a distributor under the Walturdaw name until 1924.

The company was wound up on 17 June 1925.
