= Brent Civic Centre =

Municipal building in London, England

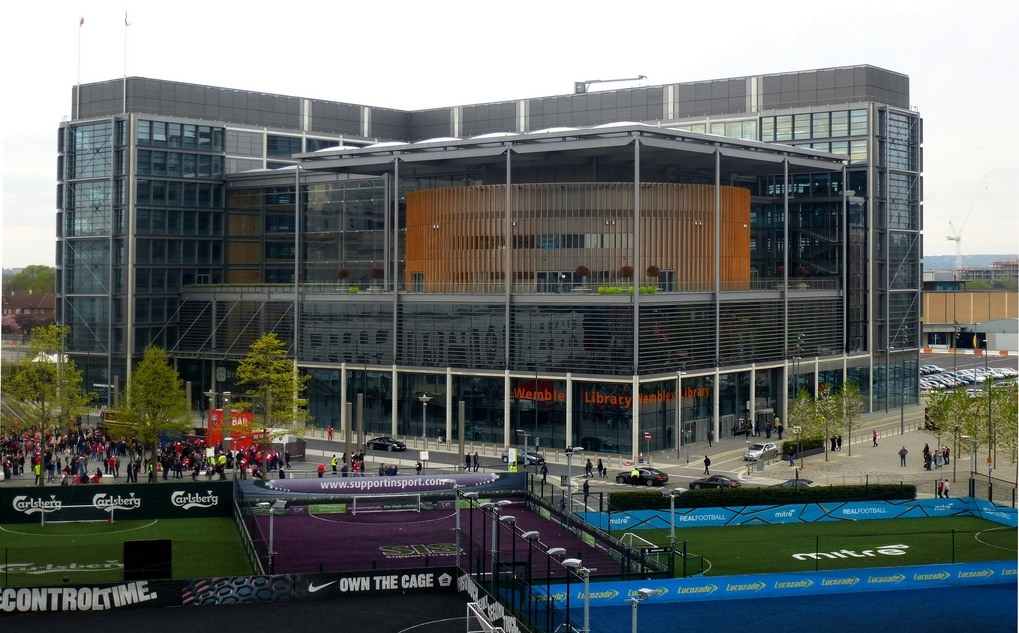
- Brent Civic Centre and Wembley Library in 2014

- Location within London Borough of Brent

General information
- Type: Municipal headquarters
- Location: Engineers Way, Wembley Park, London, United Kingdom
- Coordinates: 51.5590°N 0.2815°W
- Opened: 2013
- Owner: Brent London Borough Council

Design and construction
- Architect: Hopkins Architects
- Main contractor: Skanska

Brent Civic Centre is the headquarters of Brent London Borough Council, situated on Engineers Way in the Wembley Park area of the London Borough of Brent. It was opened in 2013, replacing the former headquarters at Brent Town Hall located a mile north on Forty Lane.

== History ==
The building was commissioned to replace the aging Brent Town Hall. The site selected for the new building had previously been occupied by the former Palace of Industry which had been built for the British Empire Exhibition in 1924.

The construction work started on site in November 2010. The new building, which was designed by Hopkins Architects and built by Skanska at a cost of £75 million, was officially opened to the public on 6 October 2013.

Key aspects of the internal design for the nine-storey glass structure included a large atrium and a feature looking like a circular drum. The atrium, which at 30 metres (98 ft) high, was also intended to double as an events venue, featured a wide staircase which was fitted with seating in the central section so allowing it to function as a grandstand. The circular drum, which was clad in timber, was partitioned inside to create a council chamber, community hall and library. The design also allowed the building to act as a community hub, with two cafés, entertainment spaces, meeting rooms and a wedding garden. When it opened, the civic centre was described by a journalist at the Guardian as "like ...the parliament of a small nation state".

The scheme allowed some 2,000 council staff carrying out civic and administrative functions, who had previously been based at various locations around the borough, to be co-located in one place. The intention was to provide most of the Council's services in the new building, which is roughly in the centre of the borough, other than its archives department which was to remain at The Library at Willesden Green. Brent Civic Centre was awarded a BREEAM 'Outstanding' rating. The design reduced carbon emissions by a third thanks to solar shading, natural ventilation and a combined cooling, heating and power using waste fish oil.

In May 2015 the building had to be evacuated when an unexploded 50 kilograms (110 lb) Luftwaffe bomb dating from the Second World War was uncovered by construction workers operating in Empire Way.

== In popular culture ==
Brent Civic Centre features in Avengers: Age of Ultron, doubling for Johannesburg.
