= Elite Cinema, Wembley Park =

Former cinema in Wembley, Middlesex, England

Coordinates: 51.5587°N 0.2850°W

The Elite Cinema was a cinema in Wembley Park, Middlesex that opened on 21 March 1928 and closed in the 1940s. It was situated in the former conference hall of the British Empire Exhibition on Raglan Gardens (today Empire Way). The large 1,500-seat new cinema also incorporated a dance hall, a restaurant and a dance school.

The Elite was soon renovated and renamed, reopening as the Capitol Cinema in 1930. It now boasted 1,637 seats. By 1937 its owners had been taken over by Odeon, but the two companies remained separate and Capitol retained its name.

Although some trade publications list it as operating until 1947, it appears that the Capitol was converted into temporary wartime accommodation in 1943 and never reopened. The building was later demolished.
