= Edward George Turner =

Edward George Turner (27 March 1872 – 17 April 1962) was a British entrepreneur who operated the first company in Britain to rent films and he invented one of the earliest sound synchronization systems.

== Biography ==
He was born in 1872 and began showing films in 1896. Below is a quote from Turner's writing for Kinematograph Weekly, a publication he wrote for in 1926:

"For our first display we hired the hall adjoining the Constitutional Club, Guildford, from Monday, November 16, 1896, our takings that night being £8 1s 1d. the intervening days up to Friday, November 20, were used in posting our bills and distributing handbills from door to door at Godalming, ready for the show to be given there on that night."

He founded the film studio Walturdaw on 25 August 1904 in Britain with George Harry John Dawson and John Dewhurst Walker. A number of these films were made in a studio in Sir Edward Watkin's pleasure grounds at Wembley Park, north-west London, after Walturdaw took over and adapted the old Variety Hall, a large wooden variety theatre, there in 1907. Turner developed one of the first sound and image synchronization systems, Cinematophone in 1907. He worked as managing director of Walturdaw, and its successor The Cinema Supply Company, until the 1930s. He was chairman of the Kinematograph Renter's Society and the Kinematograph Manufacturer's Association, and president of the Cinema Veterans Society. He died in 1962.
