= Clifford Strange =

English architect

Clifford Strange (born c.1906) was an English architect.

He started out as an assistant of Thomas Tait in 1928 before setting up in practice himself.

== Works ==
- 1935-40 Wembley Town Hall, Wembley Park

This was a competition winning scheme. The submissions being judged by Stanley Hemp. The completed building was subsequently covered in the architectural press,
