= Lycée International de Londres Winston Churchill =

Lycée International Winston Churchill
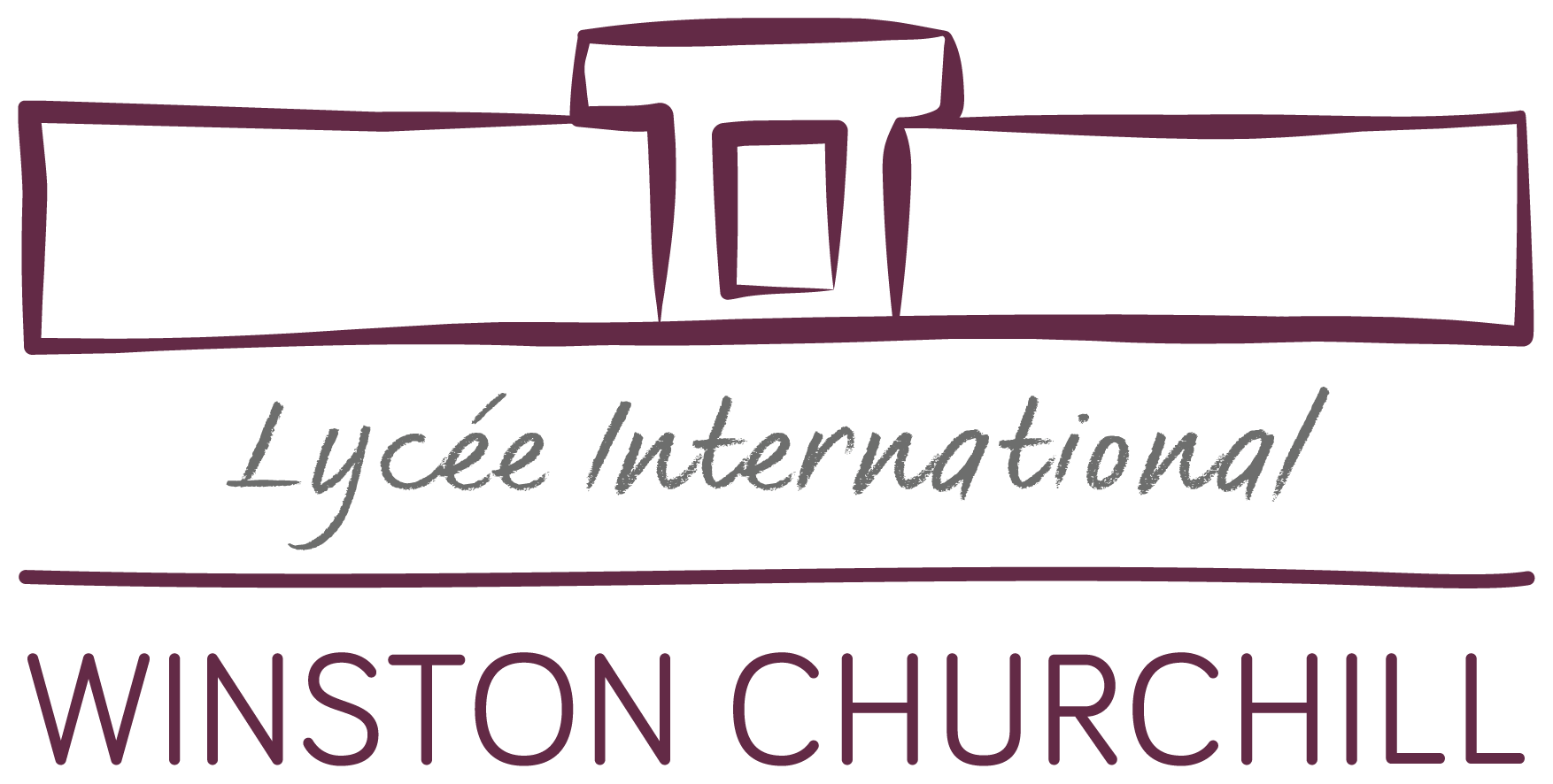

Location
- 54 Forty Lane; Wembley Park; London, HA9 9LY; England; 51.5660°N 0.2741°W

Information
- Type: International School French lycee Bilingual International School Primary School Secondary School
- Motto: Excellence Through Care.
- Established: 2015
- Department for Education URN: 142329 Tables
- Ofsted: Reports
- Chairman: Arnaud Vaissié
- Head of School: Mireille Rabaté
- Gender: Mixed
- Age: 3 to 18
- Language: English and French
- Colours: Burgundy, navy, and black
- Website: lyceeinternational.london

Lycée International Winston Churchill is a bilingual international school for pupils aged three to 18, located in Wembley, London, England. The school occupies the former Brent Town Hall, a Grade II listed civic building, and delivers both English and French national curricula within an international educational framework. Founded in 2015, the school serves a highly diverse student body representing dozens of nationalities and cultural backgrounds.

== Overview ==
Lycée International Winston Churchill offers a dual-curriculum education designed to prepare students for higher education in the United Kingdom, France, and internationally. Pupils may enrol in either an English International Programme, leading to International General Certificate of Secondary Education (IGCSE) qualifications and the International Baccalaureate Diploma Programme (IBDP), or the French National Programme, culminating in the French baccalauréat.

The school places strong emphasis on bilingualism, academic excellence, international-mindedness, and personal development, aligning its educational philosophy with the values associated with its namesake, Sir Winston Churchill.

== History ==
The school was established in 2015 in response to growing demand in London for high-quality bilingual and international education. Its location in the former Brent Town Hall provides a distinctive setting that combines historical architectural significance with modern educational facilities.

Since opening, Lycée International Winston Churchill has expanded across all age groups from early years through sixth form, building a reputation for strong academic outcomes and international university progression.

== Campus and Facilities ==
Lycée International Winston Churchill is housed in the former Brent Town Hall in Wembley, a landmark building originally constructed in the 1930s. The campus has been adapted to support contemporary teaching and learning while preserving its historic character. Facilities include science laboratories, specialist classrooms, a library, creative and performance spaces, and areas dedicated to early years education.

The school’s location in north-west London provides strong transport links and accessibility for families across the capital and surrounding areas.

== Curriculum ==
=== English International Programme ===
The English International Programme follows a British-based curriculum adapted for an international context. Students typically complete IGCSEs before progressing to the International Baccalaureate Diploma Programme in the sixth form. The programme emphasises critical thinking, inquiry-based learning, and global perspectives.

=== French National Programme ===
The French National Programme follows the curriculum prescribed by the French Ministry of Education. Instruction is primarily in French and leads to the French baccalauréat, a qualification widely recognised by universities worldwide.

=== Bilingual Education ===
Across both programmes, bilingualism is a central pillar of the school’s identity. Students are encouraged to develop high levels of proficiency in both English and French, with additional language learning opportunities supporting the school’s international ethos.

== Student body ==
Lycée International Winston Churchill educates students from early years (age three) through to age 18. The school is characterised by a highly international community; as of 2019, students represented approximately 40 different nationalities. This diversity is reflected in the school’s curriculum, extracurricular activities, and community life.

== Academic Performance and University Progression ==
Lycée International Winston Churchill reports consistently strong academic outcomes across both its English International and French National programmes. Students following the English International Programme complete IGCSE examinations before progressing to the International Baccalaureate Diploma Programme (IBDP) in the sixth form.[4]

For its early graduating cohorts, the school reported high levels of success in university admissions. Among the first cohort of graduating students, 92% of those who chose to pursue higher education secured places at Russell Group universities in the United Kingdom.[3] Subsequent cohorts have continued to progress to selective universities in the UK, France, Europe, and North America, reflecting the school’s dual-curriculum model and international orientation.

IB Diploma results at the school are supported by a structured academic and pastoral framework, with emphasis on independent research, extended writing, and critical inquiry through the Extended Essay, Theory of Knowledge, and Creativity, Activity, Service (CAS) components.[4]

The school maintains a dedicated higher education and careers guidance programme, providing tailored support for applications via UCAS, Parcoursup (France), and international admissions systems. Graduates have gone on to study disciplines including medicine, engineering, economics, humanities, international relations, and the arts at research-intensive and internationally ranked institutions.

== Inspection and Accreditation ==
In January 2020, Lycée International Winston Churchill was inspected by Ofsted and received a rating of "Good". The inspection recognised the school’s academic standards, leadership, and commitment to pupil development.

== Ethos and Values ==
The school promotes values of academic rigour, resilience, respect, and international understanding. Inspired by its namesake, Lycée International Winston Churchill encourages students to become confident, principled, and globally engaged citizens.
