= Municipal Borough of Wembley =

Former municipal borough in Middlesex, England

Coordinates: 51.5661°N 0.2741°W

Wembley
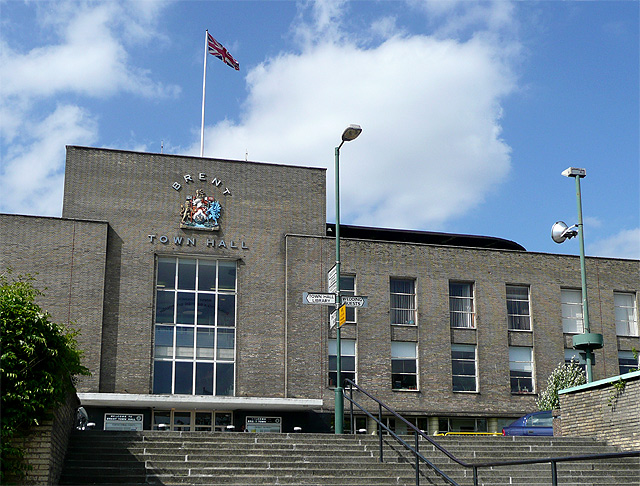
- Former Wembley Town Hall

- Wembley within Middlesex in 1961
- History
  - Created: 1894
  - Abolished: 1965
  - Succeeded by: London Borough of Brent
- Status: Urban district (until 1937); Municipal borough (from 1937)
- Government
  - HQ: Wembley Town Hall
  - Motto: Tempori Parendum (We must move with the times)
- Coat of Arms

Wembley was an urban district and later a municipal borough in Middlesex, England from 1894 to 1965.

== History ==
Wembley Urban District was created by the Local Government Act 1894 from part of the existing Hendon Rural Sanitary District, and originally consisted of two civil parishes: Kingsbury and Wembley (formed from the Alperton, south Kenton, Preston, Sudbury, North Wembley, and Wembley areas of the parish of Harrow on the Hill). The urban district council had twelve councillors: nine elected for Wembley parish and three for Kingsbury.

In 1900 Kingsbury was constituted a separate urban district, and Wembley UD was reduced to nine councillors. In 1927 the urban district was divided into six wards: Alperton, Sudbury, Kenton, Wembley Central, Wembley Hill, and Wembley Park. The number of councillors was increased to 21.

In 1934 a county review order reorganised the county districts of Middlesex, and Kingsbury Urban District was absorbed by Wembley UD. The enlarged Wembley Urban District had 12 wards. Of these, eight came from the area of the former Wembley UD (Alperton, Kenton, Tokyngton, Preston, Sudbury, Sudbury Court, Wembley Central, Wembley Park), and four from that of Kingsbury UD (Chalkhill, Fryent, The Hyde, and Roe Green).

In 1937 the urban district was granted a charter of incorporation and became a municipal borough. A corporation consisting of a mayor, 12 aldermen and 36 councillors replaced the urban district council. A coat of arms was granted on 25 January 1938. It was composed of a green shield, representing the greenery of the borough, flanked by two lions, representing John Lyon, founder of Harrow School, whose home was at Preston Manor in Wembley. Each of the lions bears a flag; one depicts a balance and the other a cornucopia, or horn of plenty. Atop the shield is a crown, and beneath is a banner with the Latin words "Tempori Parendvm".

The borough was abolished in 1965 by the London Government Act 1963 and its former area was merged with that of the neighbouring Municipal Borough of Willesden to form the London Borough of Brent. Brent Town Hall was originally built for the newly incorporated Municipal Borough of Wembley in the late 1930s.
