= London Designer Outlet =

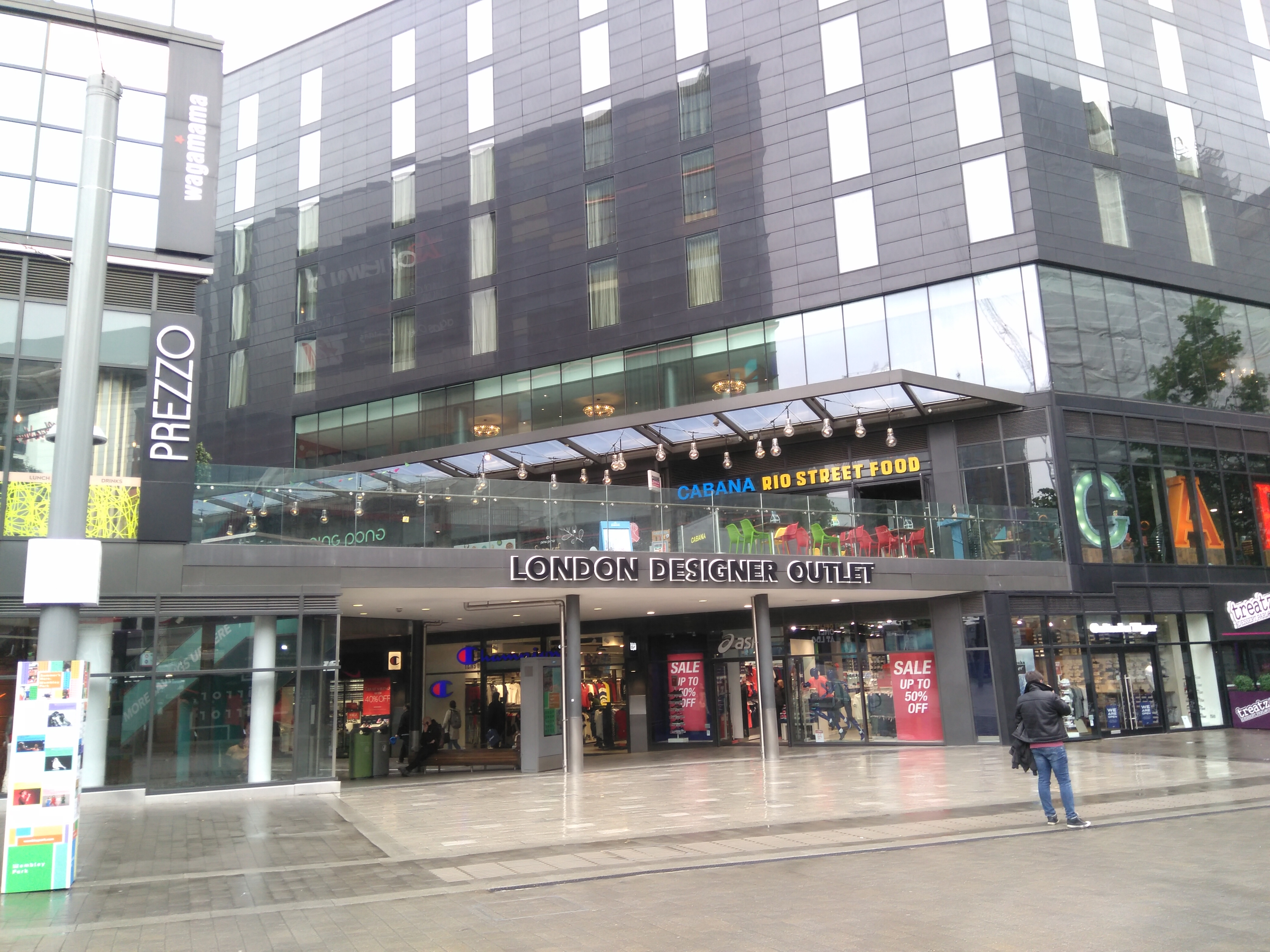
- Eastern entrance on Wembley Park Boulevard
- Location: Wembley, England
- Coordinates: 51.5565958°N 0.2851395°W
- Opened: 24 October 2013; 13 years ago
- Owner: Quintain
- Num. of stores: 81
- Floor area: 350,000 sq ft (33,000 m^{2})
- Floors: 3
- Parking: 2,400
- Public transit: Wembley Park; Wembley Central; Wembley Stadium
- Website: www.londondesigneroutlet.com

London Designer Outlet (abbreviated LDO) is a semi-outdoor shopping centre in Wembley in the London Borough of Brent. Located on Wembley Park Boulevard adjacent to both Wembley Stadium and Wembley Arena, it opened in 2013 as the first outlet centre in Greater London.

== History ==
It officially opened on 24 October 2013, London's first outlet exclusive centre, as part of the 87 acres (35 ha) Wembley Park Redevelopment project by owners Quintain. The development cost £65 million. The total retail space of the shopping centre is 350,000 sq ft (33,000 m^{2}).

As of late 2018, total revenues at London Designer Outlet have risen 97% since its opening, and it attracts 7 million visitors a year.

== Retail area ==
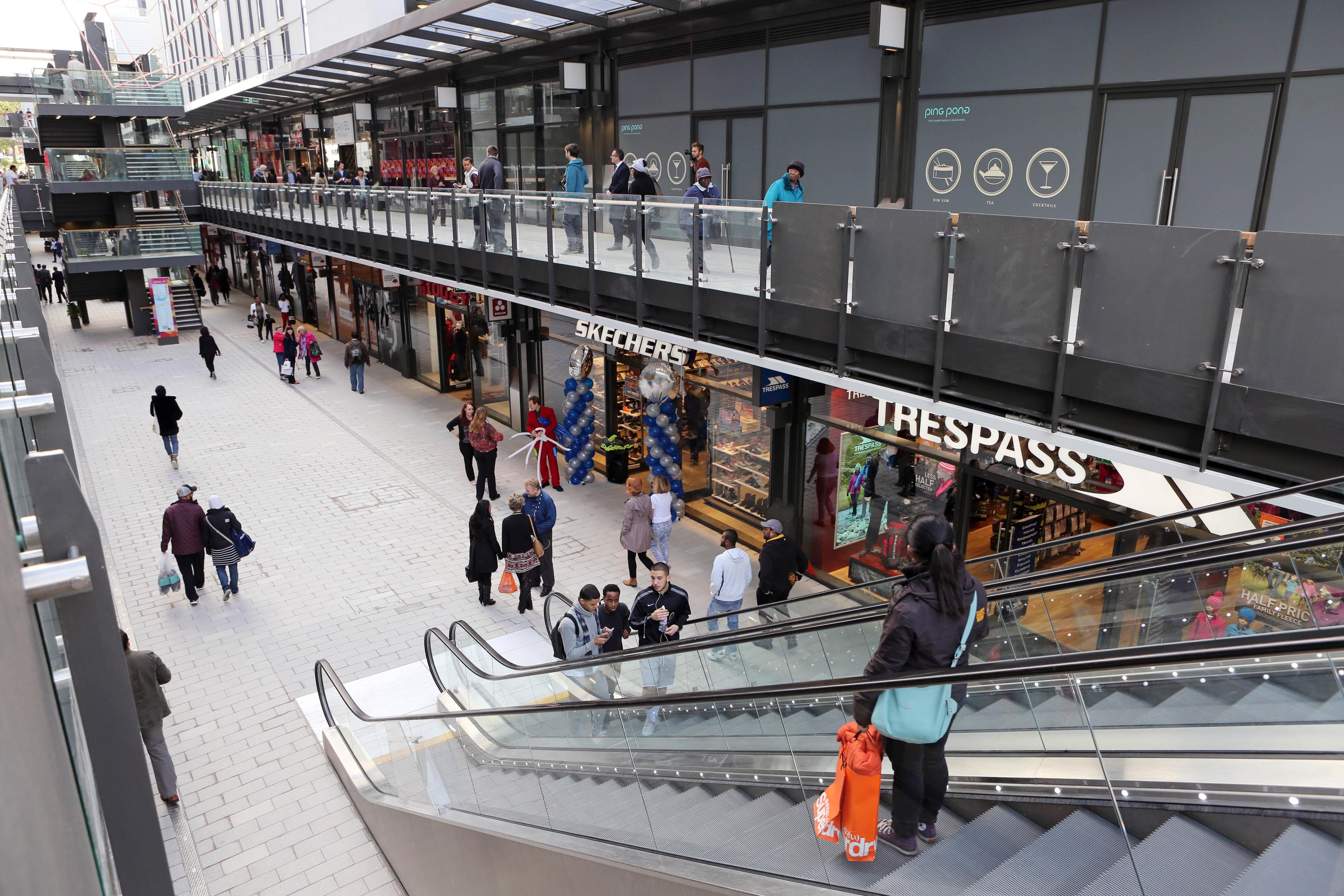
Interior of London Designer Outlet, viewed from the 2nd floor

The Outlet centre consists of some 350,000 sq ft (33,000 m^{2}) which houses over 70 stores and restaurants across three floors, of which around 50 are outlet shops selling goods at a minimum discount of 30% off RRP, though with many outlet stores offering savings of up to 70% off RRP year-round. Along with this the outlet centre also has space for events which is used during seasonal time periods, most recently to screen the Royal Wedding, Wimbledon and the World Cup, though it is also used for music and cultural events as well. LDO's 20 coffee shops and restaurants provide 2,000 covers and there is also a nine-screen, 1,800 seat Cineworld cinema. BREEAM Retail gave it a ‘Very Good’ rating as well as a ‘Very Positive’ on Brent's Sustainable Development Checklist.

With its location next to Wembley Stadium and its line-up of well-known brands, LDO is becoming famous for its 'athleisure' stores, though its top performers reflect its greater diversity and include one of the top Gap outlet stores in Europe, one of the top Nike outlet stores in Europe and the top Guess outlet store in Europe. It opened UK 'firsts' for outlet stores from H&M, Converse, and Haribo.

London Designer Outlet became the first shopping centre in the UK to offer 'store to door' delivery via DropIt with delivery within 24 hours to any postal code in mainland Britain, for a flat rate of £10.50 for an unlimited number of LDO shopping bags condensed into one delivery.

== Transport ==
=== Trains ===
Wembley Stadium station for Chiltern Railways is located some 300 yards (270 m) from London Designer Outlet, while Wembley Park tube station for the London Underground is one-half mile (0.80 km) away, accessed through Wembley Park Boulevard and Olympic Way. In addition, Wembley Central station for Southern Railways, London Overground, and London Underground, is also less than one mile (1.6 km) from the centre.

=== Buses ===
The centre is served by London Buses routes 83, 92, 182, 206, 223, 297 and 483.

=== Parking ===
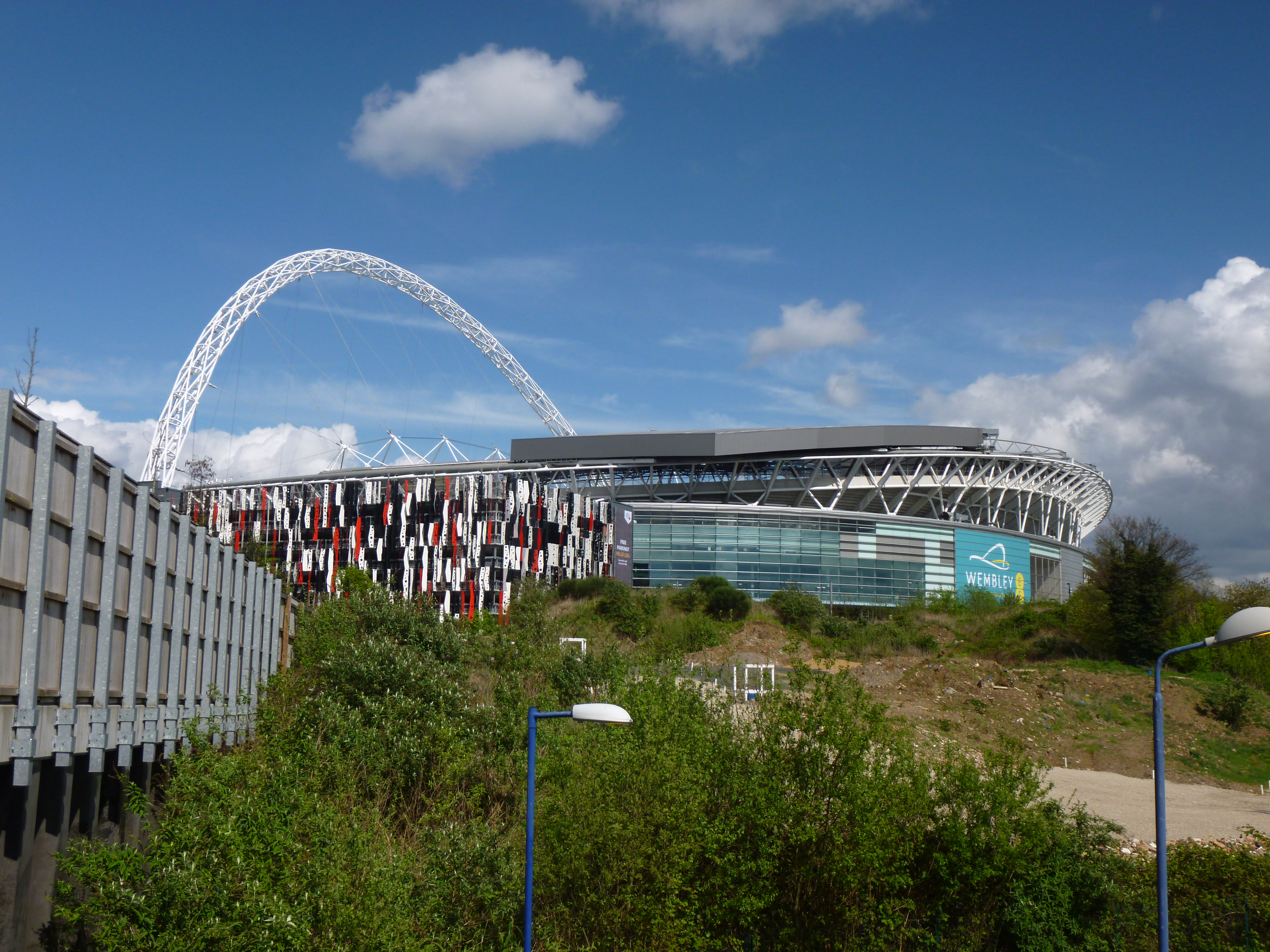
The red-white building here is the LDO car park

LDO has a 1,000-space multi-storey "Red" Car Park, located opposite its main entrance. This car park is also used by Wembley Stadium and Wembley Arena on event days.

== In popular culture ==
In November 2015, British Rapper Tion Wayne filmed a music video for his single Be Like That at the outlet centre.
