= William Henry Perkin =

English chemist and entrepreneur (1838–1907)

Sir William Henry Perkin FRS
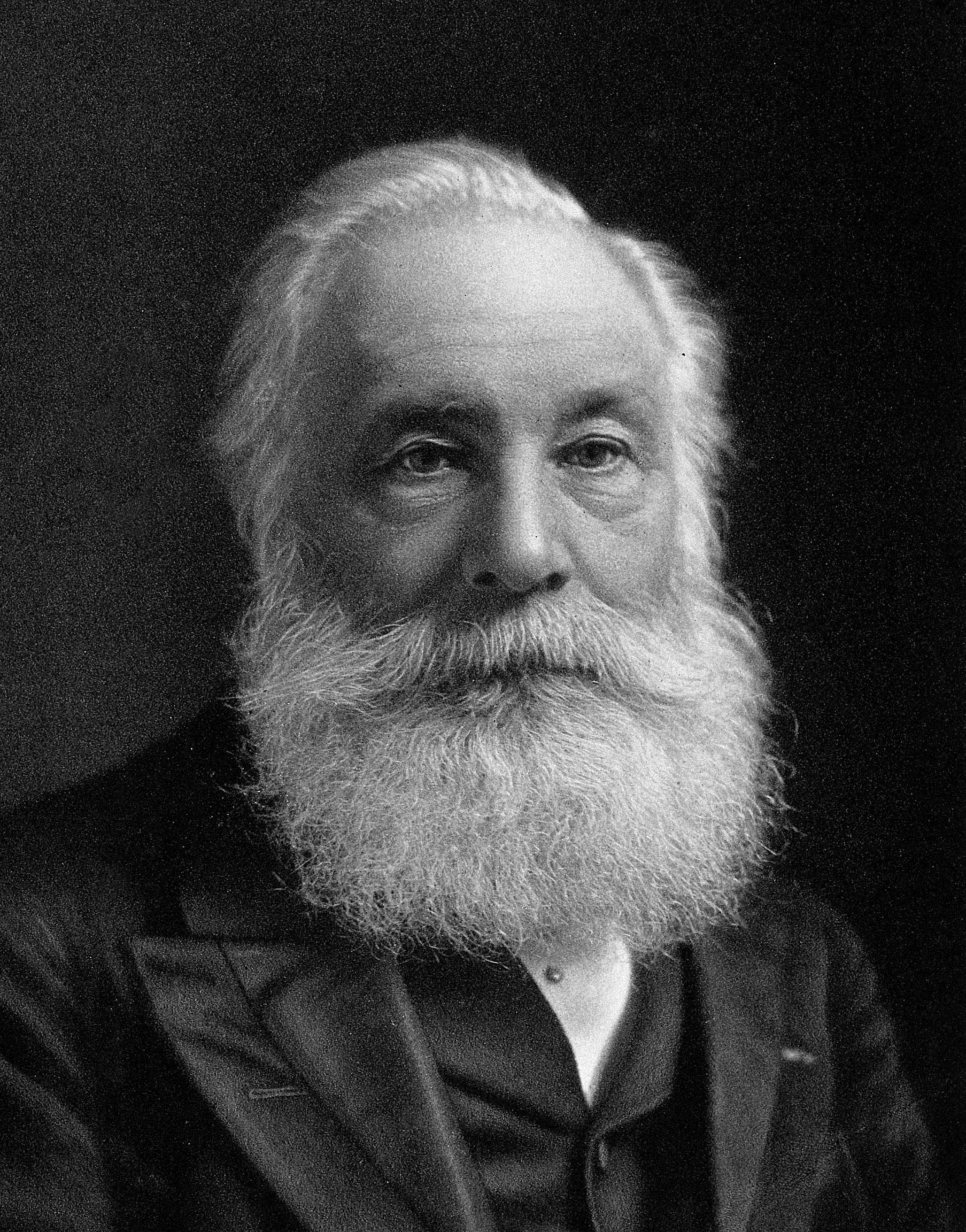
- Perkin in 1906
- Born: 12 March 1838; London, England
- Died: 14 July 1907 (aged 69); London, England
- Education: Royal College of Chemistry
- Known for: Aniline dye Perkin's mauve Perkin reaction Perkin rearrangement
- Awards: Royal Medal (1879); Longstaff Prize (1888); Davy Medal (1889); Albert Medal (1890); Perkin Medal (1906)
- Scientific career
- Fields: Chemistry

Signature
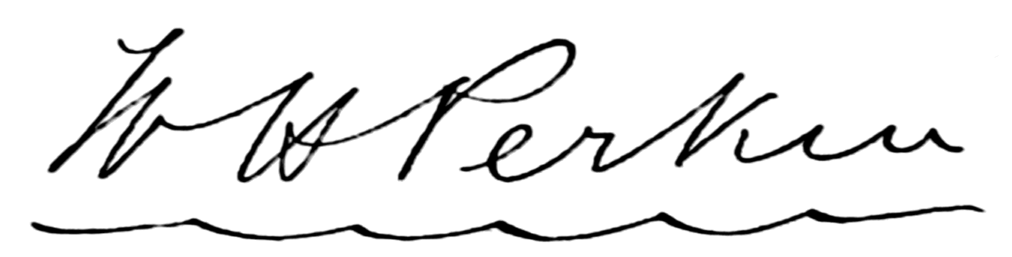

Sir William Henry Perkin (12 March 1838 – 14 July 1907) was an English chemist and entrepreneur best known for his serendipitous discovery of the first commercial synthetic organic dye, mauveine, made from aniline. Though he failed in trying to synthesise quinine for the treatment of malaria, he became successful in the field of dyes after his first discovery at the age of 18.

Perkin set up a factory to produce the dye industrially. Regina Lee Blaszczyk, professor of business history at the University of Leeds, states, "By laying the foundation for the synthetic organic chemicals industry, Perkin helped to revolutionize the world of fashion."

== Early years ==
William Perkin was born in the East End of London, the youngest of the seven children of George Perkin, a successful carpenter. His mother, Sarah, was of Scottish descent and moved to East London as a child. He was baptized in the Anglican parish church of St Paul's, Shadwell, which had been connected to James Cook, Jane Randolph Jefferson (mother of Thomas Jefferson) and John Wesley.

At the age of 14, Perkin attended the City of London School, where he was taught by Thomas Hall, who fostered his scientific talent and encouraged him to pursue a career in chemistry.

== Accidental discovery of mauveine ==
In 1853, at the age of 15, Perkin entered the Royal College of Chemistry, now part of Imperial College London, where he began his studies under August Wilhelm von Hofmann. At this time, chemistry was still primitive: although the major elements had been discovered and techniques to analyze the proportions of the elements in many compounds were in place, it was still a difficult proposition to determine the arrangement of the elements in compounds. Hofmann had published a hypothesis on how it might be possible to synthesise quinine, an expensive natural substance much in demand for the treatment of malaria. Having become one of Hofmann's assistants, Perkin embarked on a series of experiments to try to achieve this end.

During the Easter vacation in 1856, Perkin performed some further experiments in the crude laboratory in his apartment on the top floor of his home on Cable Street in east London. It was here that he made his great accidental discovery: that aniline could be partly transformed into a crude mixture which, when extracted with alcohol, produced a substance with an intense purple colour. Perkin, who had an interest in painting and photography, immediately became enthusiastic about this result and carried out further trials with his friend Arthur Church and his brother Thomas. Since these experiments were not part of the work on quinine which had been assigned to Perkin, the trio carried them out in a hut in Perkin's garden to keep them secret from Hofmann.

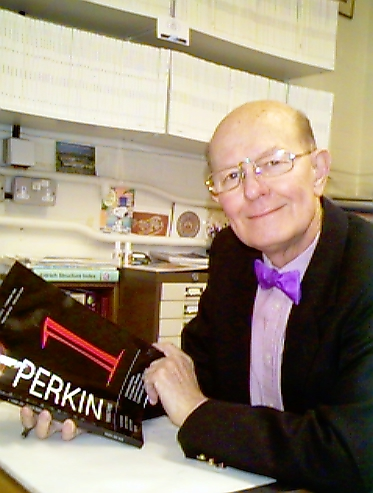
Professor Charles Rees wearing a bow tie dyed with an original sample of mauveine while holding a Royal Society of Chemistry journal named after Perkin

They satisfied themselves that they might be able to scale up production of the purple substance and commercialise it as a dye, which they called mauveine. Their initial experiments indicated that it dyed silk in a way which was stable when washed or exposed to light. They sent some samples to a dye works in Perth, Scotland, and received a very promising reply from the general manager of the company, Robert Pullar. Perkin filed for a patent in August 1856, when he was still only 18.

At the time, all dyes used for colouring cloth were natural substances, many of which were expensive and labour-intensive to extract—and many lacked stability, or fastness. The colour purple, which had been a mark of aristocracy and prestige since ancient times, was especially expensive and difficult to produce. Its extraction was variable and complicated, and so Perkin and his brother realised that they had discovered a possible substitute whose production could be commercially successful.

Perkin could not have chosen a better time or place for his discovery: England was the cradle of the Industrial Revolution, largely driven by advances in the production of textiles; the science of chemistry had advanced to the point where it could have a major impact on industrial processes; and coal tar, the major source of his raw material, was an abundant by-product of the process for making coal gas and coke.

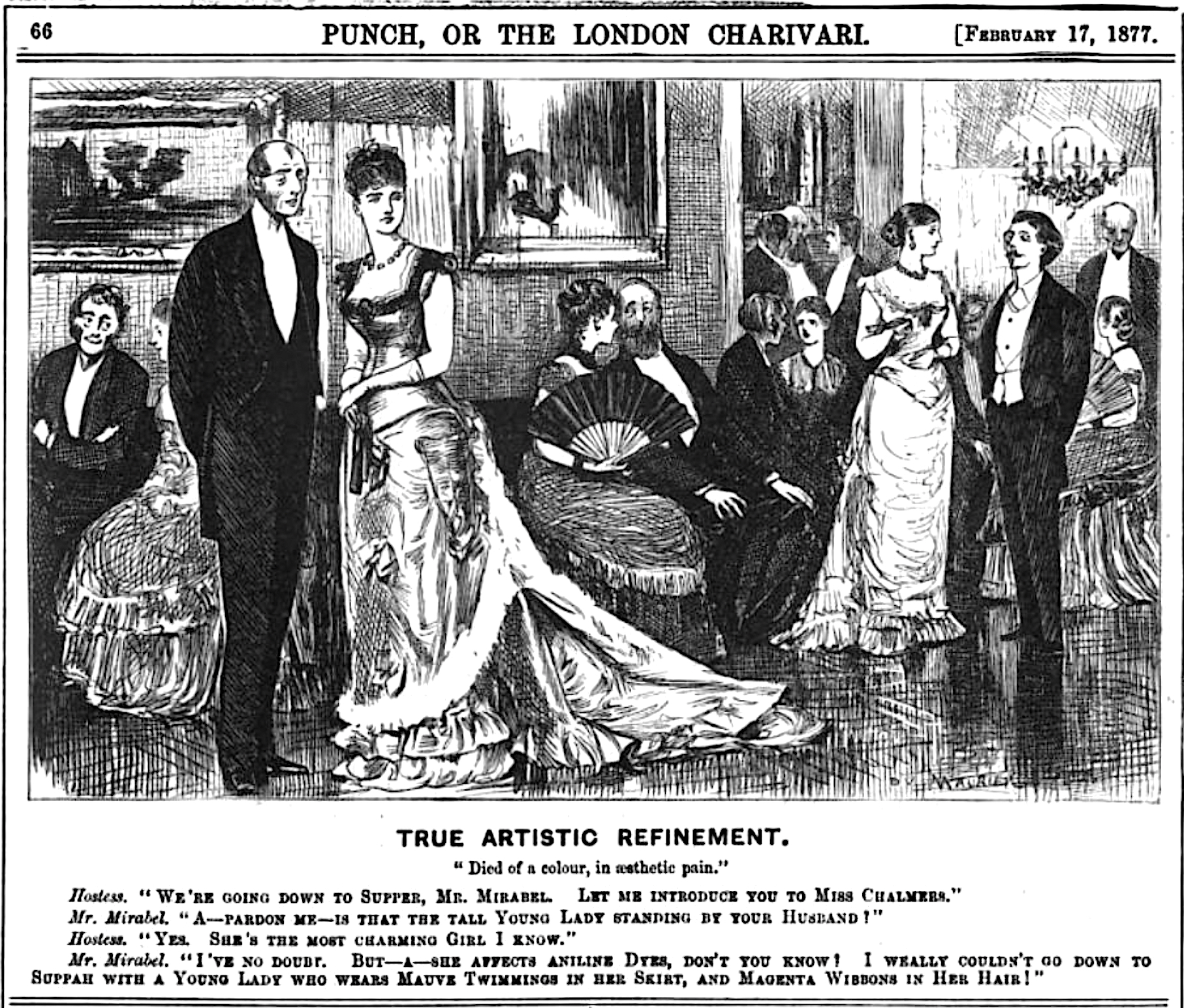
The craze for aniline dyes, satirised in this George du Maurier cartoon

Having invented the dye, Perkin was still faced with the problems of raising the capital for producing it, manufacturing it cheaply, adapting it for use in dyeing cotton, gaining acceptance for it among commercial dyers, and creating public demand for it. He was active in all of these areas: he persuaded his father to put up the capital, and his brothers to partner with him to build a factory; he invented a mordant for cotton; he gave technical advice to the dyeing industry; and he publicised his invention of the dye.

Public demand was increased when a similar colour was adopted by Queen Victoria in Britain and by Empress Eugénie, wife of Napoleon III, in France, and when the crinoline or hooped-skirt, whose manufacture used a large quantity of cloth, became fashionable. Perkin’s mauve was cheaper than traditional, natural purple dyes and became so popular that English humourists joked about the 'mauve measles'. Everything fell into place: with hard work and lucky timing, Perkin became rich. After the discovery of mauveine, many new aniline dyes appeared (some discovered by Perkin himself), and factories producing them were constructed across Europe.

== Later years ==
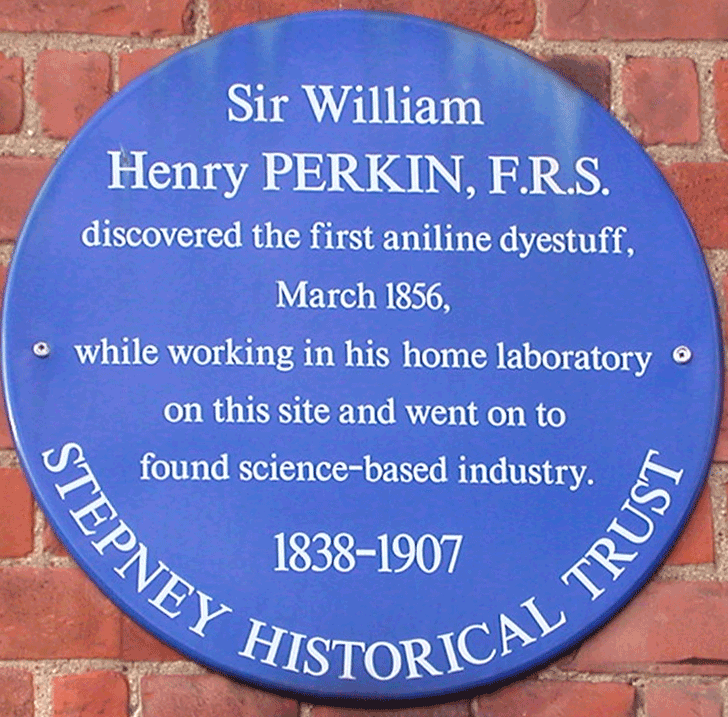
Blue plaque in Cable Street

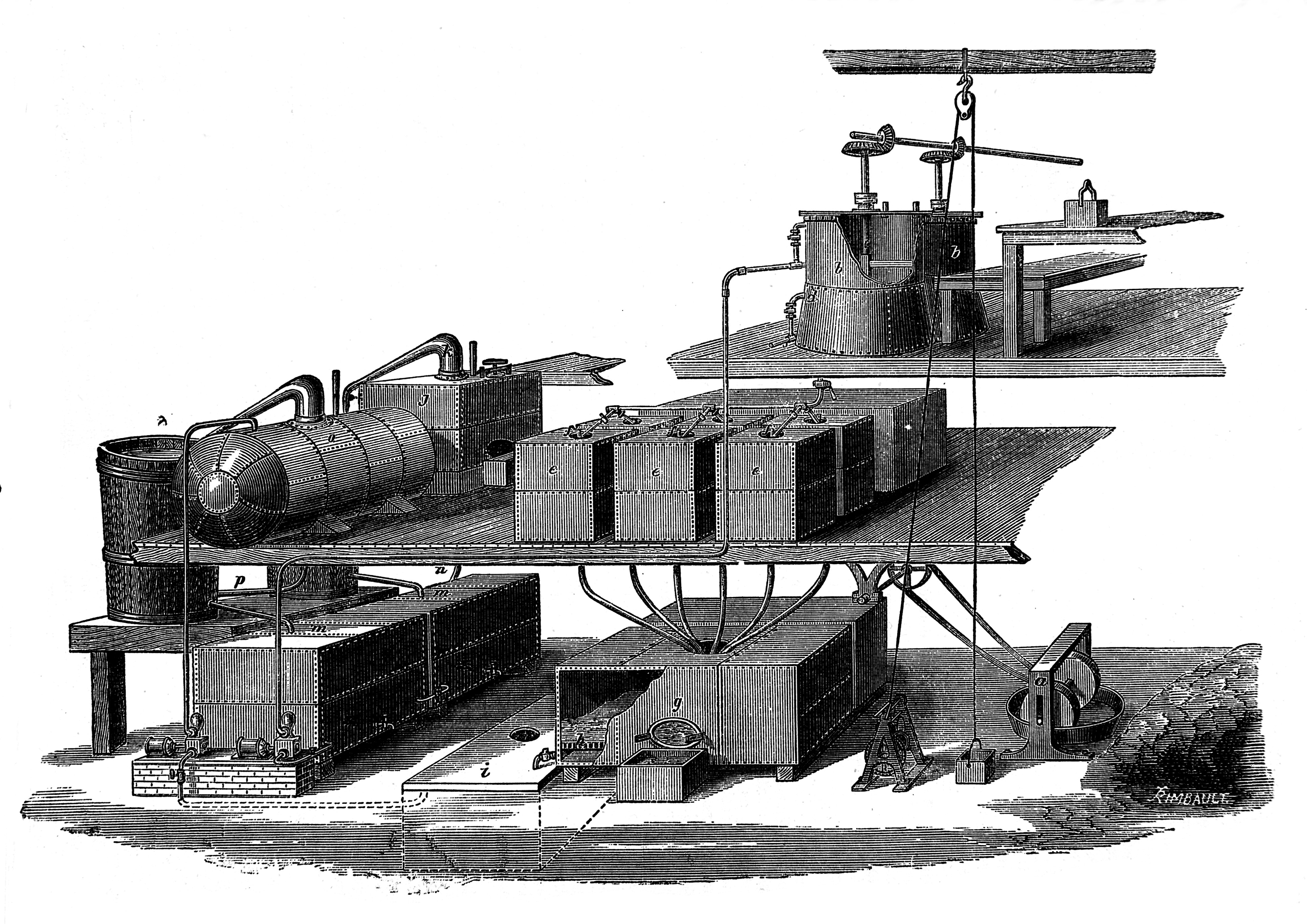
Section of Coal Tar Colour Works at Greenford

William Perkin continued active research in organic chemistry for the rest of his life: he discovered and marketed other synthetic dyes, including Britannia Violet and Perkin's Green; he discovered ways to make coumarin, one of the first synthetic raw materials of perfume, and cinnamic acid. (The reaction used to make the last became known as the Perkin reaction.) Local lore has it that the colour of the nearby Grand Union Canal changed from week to week depending on the activity at Perkin's Greenford dyeworks.

In 1869, Perkin found a method for the commercial production from anthracene of the brilliant red dye alizarin, which had been isolated and identified from madder root some forty years earlier in 1826 by the French chemist Pierre Robiquet, simultaneously with purpurin, another red dye of lesser industrial interest, but the German chemical company BASF patented the same process one day before he did.

During the next decade, the new German Empire was rapidly eclipsing Britain as the centre of Europe's chemical industry. By the 1890s, Germany had a near-monopoly on the business and Perkin was compelled to sell off his holdings and retire. He was a member of the Manchester Literary and Philosophical Society, elected on 26 April 1892, followed by his son, William Henry Perkin Jr., on 15 November 1892.

== Personal life and demise ==
Perkin married Jemima Harriet, the daughter of John Lissett, in 1859, which resulted in two sons, (William Henry Perkin Jr. and Arthur George Perkin). Perkin's second marriage was in 1866, to Alexandrine Caroline, daughter of Helman Mollwo. They had one son (Frederick Mollwo Perkin) and four daughters. All three sons became chemists.

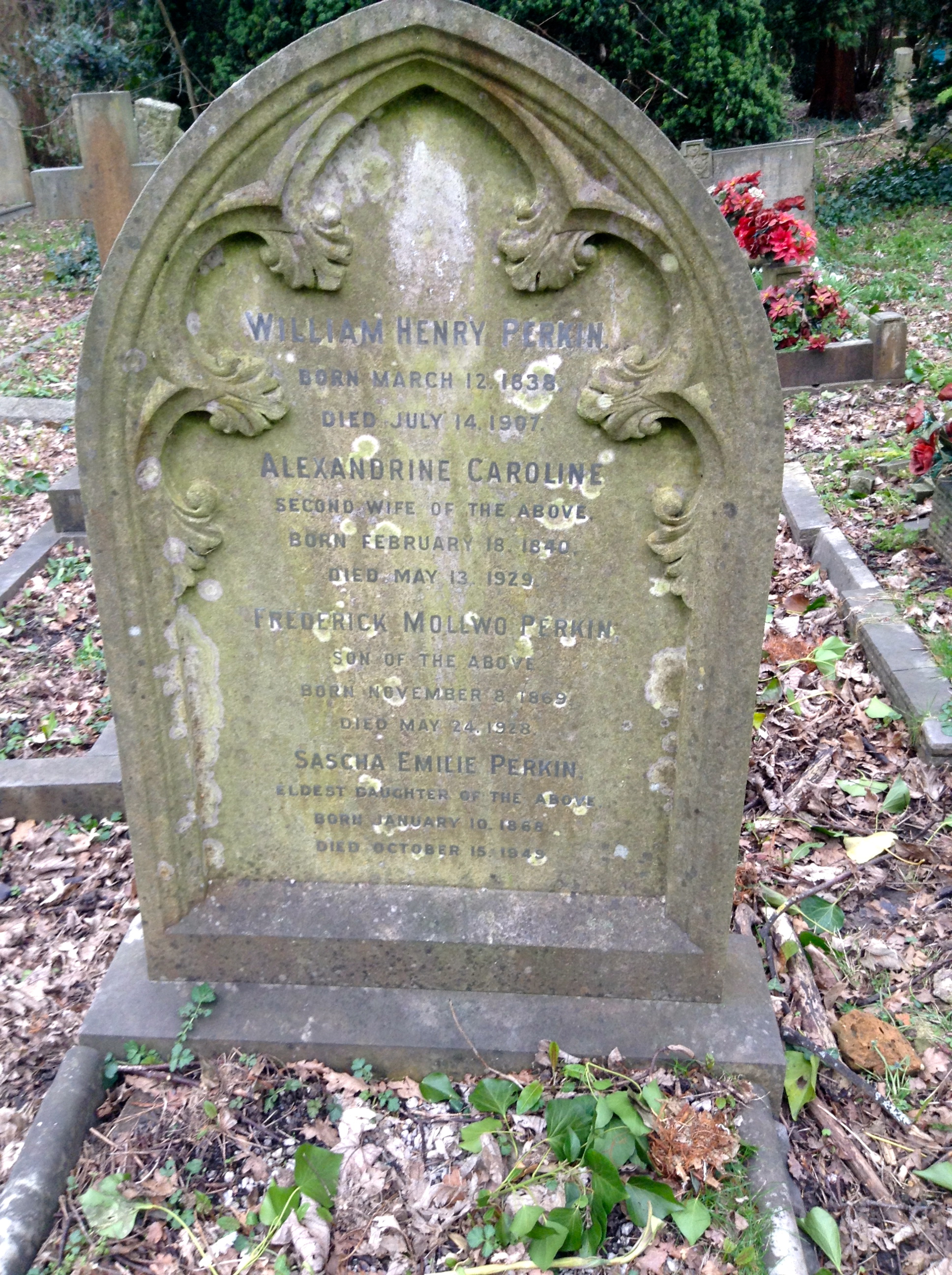
Perkin's gravestone

Perkin died in 1907 of pneumonia and other complications resulting from a burst appendix. He is buried in the grounds of Christchurch, Harrow, Middlesex. His will was proved on 28 August 1907 at £86,231 4s. 11d. (roughly equivalent to £8,968,788 in 2025).

== Honours, awards and commemorations ==
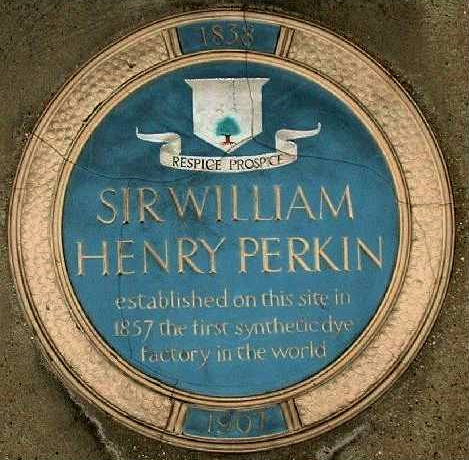
Blue plaque in Greenford, England, near the Grand Union Canal

Perkin received many honours in his lifetime. In June 1866, he was elected a Fellow of the Royal Society. In 1879, received their Royal Medal and, in 1889, their Davy Medal. He was knighted in 1906, and in the same year was awarded the first Perkin Medal, established to commemorate the fiftieth anniversary of his discovery of mauveine. Today, the Perkin Medal is widely acknowledged as the highest honour in the U.S. industrial chemistry and has been awarded annually by the American section of the Society of Chemical Industry. He was President of the Society of Chemical Industry from 1884-85.

Perkin was a Liveryman of the Leathersellers' Company for 46 years and was elected Master of the Company for the year 1896–97.

Blue plaques mark the sites of Perkin's home on Cable Street (by the junction with King David Lane)_ and the Perkin factory in Greenford, Middlesex.

A portrait of Perkin by Edward Railton Catterns (1838–1909) is owned by the University of Strathclyde.

On 12 March 2018, search engine Google showed a Google Doodle to mark Perkin's 180th birthday.

=== William Perkin High School ===
In 2013, the William Perkin Church of England High School opened in Greenford, Middlesex. The school is operated by the Twyford Church of England Academies Trust (which also operates Twyford Church of England High School). The school is named after William Perkin, and has adopted a mauve uniform and colour scheme, in tribute to his discovery of mauveine.

=== Imperial College London ===
Since 2007, when Imperial College London gained its own Royal Charter, the Academic dress of Imperial College London features purple across the range of garments to celebrate the work of Perkin. In 2015, Professor Alice Gast, President of the College, stated: "The colour purple symbolises the spirit of endeavour and discovery, and the risk-taking nature that characterises those with an Imperial education and training."
