= List of schools in the London Borough of Brent =

This is a list of schools in the London Borough of Brent, England.

== State-funded schools ==
=== Primary schools ===
Source. (CE indicates Church of England, RC Roman Catholic, J Jewish, I Islamic).

- Anson Primary School
- Ark Academy
- Ark Franklin Primary Academy
- Avigdor Hirsch Torah Temimah Primary School (J)
- Barham Primary School
- Braintcroft E-Act Primary Academy
- Brentfield Primary School
- Carlton Vale Infant School
- Chalkhill Primary School
- Christ Church Primary School (CE)
- Convent of Jesus & Mary Infant School (RC)
- Donnington Primary School
- East Lane Primary School
- Elsley Primary School
- Fryent Primary School
- Furness Primary School
- Gladstone Park Primary School
- Harlesden Primary School
- Harris Primary Academy South Kenton
- Islamia Primary School (I)
- John Keble Primary School (CE)
- Kilburn Grange School
- The Kilburn Park School
- Kingsbury Green Primary School
- Leopold Primary School
- Lyon Park Primary School
- Malorees Infant School
- Malorees Junior School
- Michael Sobell Sinai School (J)
- Mitchell Brook Primary School
- Mora Primary School
- Mount Stewart Infant School
- Mount Stewart Junior School
- Newfield Primary School
- North West London Jewish Day School (J)
- Northview Junior and Infant School
- Oakington Manor Primary School
- Oliver Goldsmith Primary School
- Our Lady of Grace Infant School (RC)
- Our Lady of Grace Junior School (RC)
- Our Lady of Lourdes Primary School (RC)
- Park Lane Primary School
- Preston Manor School
- Preston Park Primary School
- Princess Frederica Primary School (CE)
- Roe Green Infant School
- Roe Green Junior School
- St Andrew & St Francis Primary School (CE)
- St Joseph's Infant School (RC)
- St Joseph's Junior School (RC)
- St Joseph's Primary School (RC)
- St Margaret Clitherow Primary School (RC)
- St Mary Magdalen's Junior School (RC)
- St Mary's Primary School (CE)
- St Mary's Primary School (RC)
- St Robert Southwell Primary School (RC)
- Salusbury Primary School
- Sinai Jewish Primary School
- The Stonebridge School
- Sudbury Primary School
- Uxendon Manor Primary School
- Wembley Primary School
- Wykeham Primary School

=== Secondary schools ===
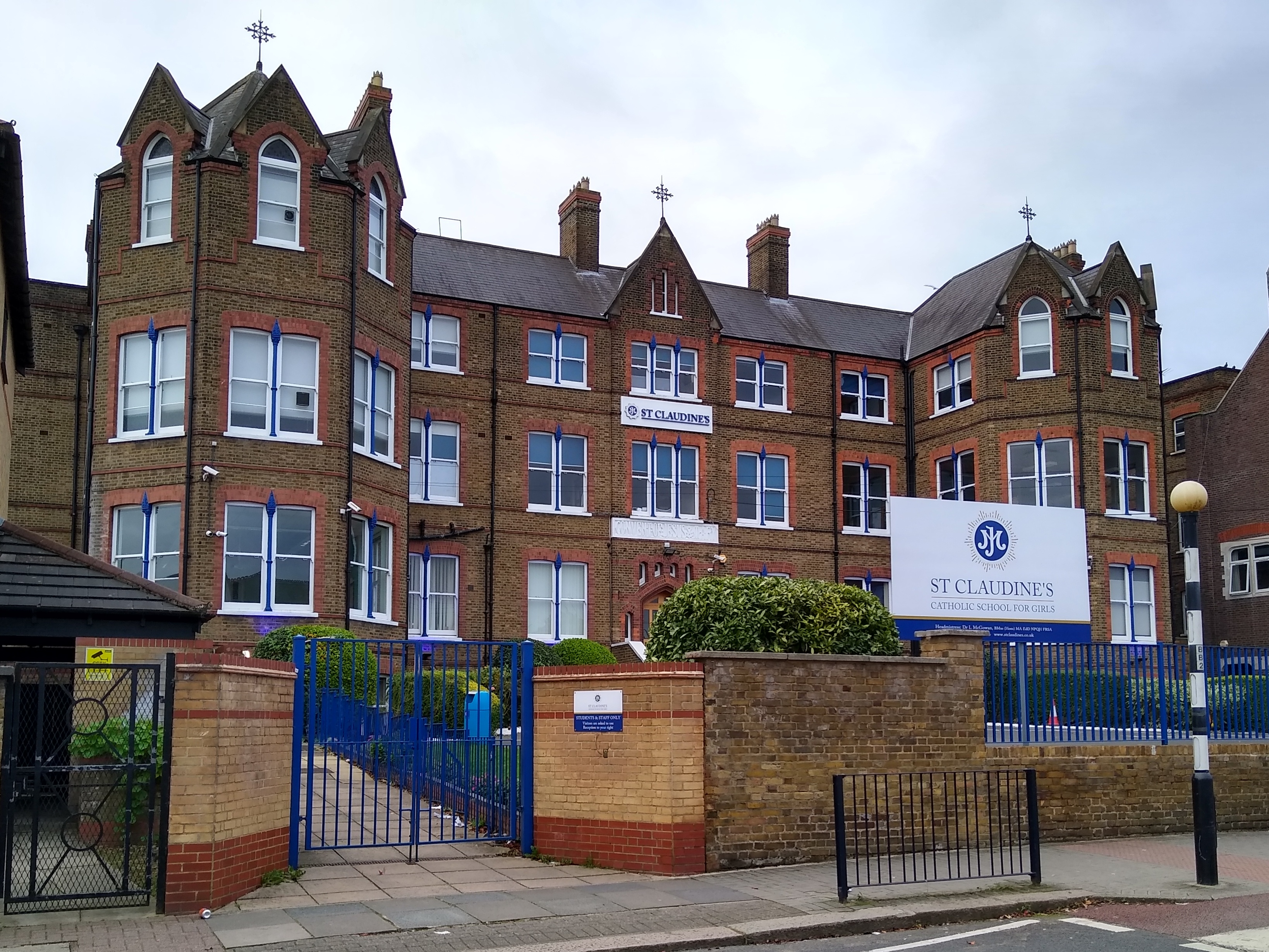
St Claudine's Catholic School for Girls

Source.

- Alperton Community School
- Ark Academy
- Ark Elvin Academy
- Capital City Academy
- Claremont High School
- E-ACT Crest Academy
- JFS
- Kingsbury High School
- Michaela Community School
- Newman Catholic College
- North Brent School
- Preston Manor School
- Queens Park Community School
- St Claudine's Catholic School for Girls
- St Gregory's RC Science College*
- Wembley High Technology College

*This school is located within The London Borough of Harrow but accepts pupils from Brent

=== Special and alternative schools ===
- The Avenue
- Ashley College
- Brent River College
- Manor School
- Phoenix Arch School
- Roundwood School
- The Village School
- Woodfield School

=== Further education ===
- College of North West London

== Independent schools ==
=== Primary and preparatory schools ===
- Advance Education
- Bnos Beis Yaakov Primary School
- Maple Walk School
- St Christopher's School

=== Senior and all-through schools ===
- Al-Sadiq School
- Al-Zahra School
- Brondesbury College
- Islamia School for Girls
- Lycée International de Londres Winston Churchill
- Menorah High School
- The School of the Islamic Republic of Iran

=== Special and alternative schools ===
- The Corner School
- Edith Kay Independent School
- Gesher School
- New Level Academy
- Southover Partnership School
