= Jewface =

Stereotypical portrayals of Jewish people

Jewface is a term that negatively characterizes stereotypical or inauthentic portrayals of Jewish people. The term has existed since the late 1800s, and most generally refers to performative Jewishness, regardless of the performer's identity.

Typical elements of performative "Jewface" include affecting a Yiddish accent and wearing facial prosthetics to imitate stereotypically Jewish features, hence the term is derived from the analogous term "blackface". More recently, the term has also been used to describe inequality in casting of Jewish performers as Jewish characters. Whether "Jewface" is appropriate to refer to inauthentic casting, when Judaism is a mix of cultural, religious, and ethnic identities, has been debated, as has the focal point of these criticisms.

== Vaudeville ==
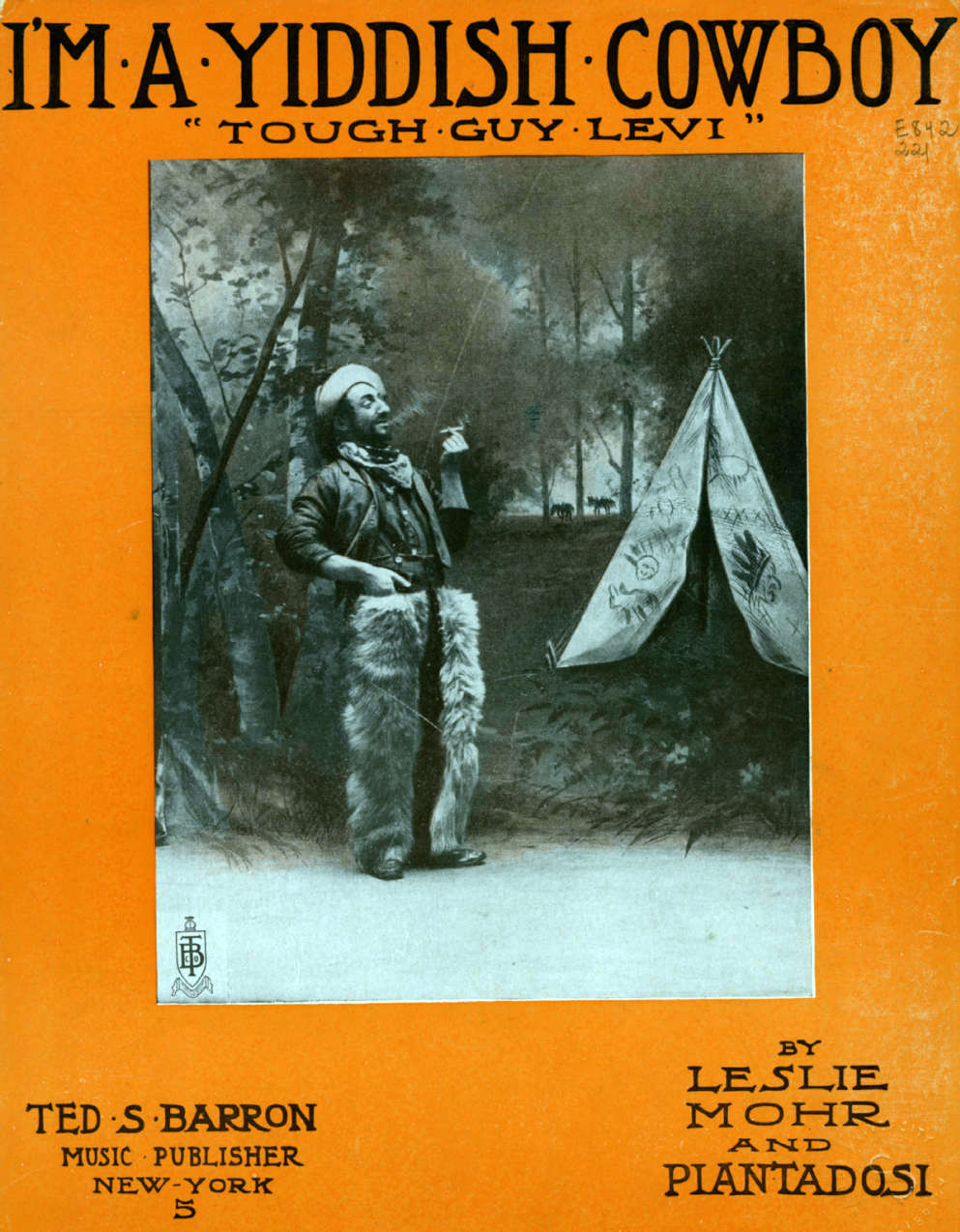
I'm a Yiddish Cowboy (1908)

In the 19th century, "Jewface" was a vaudeville act that became popular among Eastern European Jews who immigrated to the United States in the 1880s. The name plays off the term "blackface," and the act featured performers enacting Jewish stereotypes, wearing large putty noses, long beards, and tattered clothing, and speaking with thick Yiddish accent. Early portrayals were done by non-Jews, but Jews soon began to produce their own "Jewface" acts. By the early 20th century, almost all the "Jewface" actors, managers, agents, and audience members were Jewish. "Jewface" featured Jewish dialect music, written by Tin Pan Alley songwriters. These vaudeville acts were controversial at the time. In 1909 a prominent Reform rabbi said that comedy like this was "the cause of greater prejudice against the Jews as a class than all other causes combined," and that same year the Central Conference of American Rabbis denounced this type of comedy.

The exhibit Jewface: "Yiddish" Dialect Songs of Tin Pan Alley at the YIVO Institute for Jewish Research (November 2015 to June 2016, curated by Eddy Portnoy) was focused on the sheet music of this type of comedy and used Jody Rosen's sheet music collection.

== Casting ==
=== Culture and religion ===
Jewish American comedienne and actress Sarah Silverman has vocally criticized "Jewface", focusing on what she described as a pattern of gentiles playing Jewish characters whose Jewishness "is their whole being". Silverman described the pattern, using the example of Kathryn Hahn being cast to play Joan Rivers, as "Jewface", and defined this as "when a non-Jew portrays a Jew with the Jewishness front and centre", which can include changing features and using a New York or Yiddish accent. Jewish culture magazine Forward wrote that Jewish character casting is "a perennial debate in the world of casting", but, while agreeing with Silverman, admonished her for using the word "Jewface", saying that the practice should not be compared to "blackface", as "white Jews have benefited" from racism.

Jewish creatives and entertainers from Israel, the United States, and the United Kingdom, have voiced differing opinions on whether intrinsically Jewish characters should be played by Jewish actors. Time magazine and Welsh film professor Nathan Abrams have suggested that it would be difficult to address or quantify casting disparity as the definition of "Jewish" is not always simple; Abrams said that "one of the issues in "authentically" casting Jews is that Jewishness comes via a number of routes: religion, culture and ethnicity."

Screenwriter and journalist Malina Saval wrote in 2021 that Jewish culture on-screen is watered-down, saying that where Jewish characters exist, they are often entirely assimilated into a prevailing culture or self-hating, and that "being Jewish is not about a wig or an accent or talking really loud. It's not about bagels. Being Jewish is about a shared history, a soul, a spirit — in Hebrew we call it a neshama."

=== Ethnicity ===
==== Jews as a race or ethnoreligious group ====
In 2009, the majority of Jewish Americans "found it extremely difficult to position themselves on the racial binary […] in which White is located on one side and "persons of color" on the other", but, by 2020, the majority identified "as racially white". In both studies, the majority also identified as Ashkenazi. Still, in 2020, Daniel Ian Rubin proposed adding a "HebCrit" field of study, focusing on Jews as an ethnoreligious group, to critical race theory. Time noted that the supposed white privilege experienced by white Jews in the United States means it is more difficult to label inauthentic Jewish casting as "racism or cultural appropriation", going on to quote Jewish film scholar Helen Meyers in saying "Jewish literacy rather than Jewish identity is what matters".

British actress Maureen Lipman has opined that "ethnicity should be a priority" when casting roles that focus on this aspect of the character, while British presenter Esther Rantzen instead felt that focusing on an actor's ethnicity could lead to performances being little more than "racial caricatures", and that people of ethnoreligious identities different to their characters can still achieve an authentic portrayal of the person, giving, among others, several of Lipman's roles as examples. Saval noted that with a rise in antisemitic hate crimes in the United States, the media perception of Jews as an ethnic group needed to be given better treatment.

==== Jewishness as physical appearance ====
Abrams has said that casting gentile actors to portray Jewish characters whose Jewishness is incidental to the character can challenge stereotypes by not showing any outward signs of Jewishness. Variety, referencing author David Baddiel and American producer Jonathan Levi, noted that Jewish actors, particularly women, frequently are not cast in gentile roles for looking "too exotic", nor in main Jewish roles when filmmakers want the lead role to appear non-descript. It noted that this, and filmmakers wanting actors who are already famous to promote films and television, is a catch-22 scenario.

In contrast, Jewish physiognomist Sharonna Pearl argued that "Jewishness is not immediately identifiable by looking at someone. This means that an actor's religious identity and ethnicity need and ought not be brought to bear on the roles they can play." She used a comparative example of two Glee actresses, with Jewish actress Dianna Agron playing the "shiksa" character on the show who is said to have gentile features desired by a Jewish character.

=== Discrepancy in responses ===
Several Jewish creatives have framed the debate on authentic casting as not being about who can play Jewish, but about the lack of attention inauthentic castings receive; Silverman questioned why, "[i]n a time when the importance of representation is seen as so essential and so front and centre, [Jewishness] constantly [gets] breached even today in the thick of it?" British actress Tracy-Ann Oberman said that, while actors should be able to play anyone, she had noticed in the 21st century an increase in concern regarding cultural appropriation for many religious and cultural identities, but not Judaism, and felt it deserved the same respect. In his 2021 book Jews Don't Count, Baddiel reaffirmed Oberman's explanation, saying that "the discrepancy is the point".

Abrams acknowledged the lack of Jewish actors as main characters of any background on British screens, and suggested an unconscious bias in casting may be the cause.

=== Examples ===
Examples of Jewface include Hahn, Rachel Brosnahan in The Marvelous Mrs. Maisel; Will Ferrell in The Shrink Next Door; Tamsin Greig in Friday Night Dinner; Tom Hardy in Peaky Blinders; Oscar Isaac in Scenes from a Marriage, Operation Finale, and Moon Knight; Felicity Jones in On the Basis of Sex; Kelly Macdonald in Giri/Haji; Rachel McAdams in Disobedience; Helen Mirren in Golda; James Norton in McMafia; Gary Oldman in Mank; Rachel Sennott in Shiva Baby; Al Pacino in The Merchant of Venice; Ian McKellen and Michael Fassbender as Magneto; and Bradley Cooper in Maestro.

Time wrote that non-Jewish actresses, in particular, may be accepted in playing Jewish characters if their performance is deemed more authentic by Jewish audiences, saying that the prominent examples fall on a scale between Jones' outcry-drawing performance as Ruth Bader Ginsburg and Sennott's welcomed performance.

In May 2014, Irish American rapper Macklemore apologized after he wore a black wig, beard and a fake hooked nose during a concert, which was seen as him portraying a Jewish caricature.

== See also ==
- Jews in American cinema
