= Time for Bed =

Time for Bed may refer to:

- Time for Bed (Baddiel novel), a 1996 novel by David Baddiel
- Time for Bed (Fox book), a 1993 children's picture book by Mem Fox
