= Jews Don't Count =

2021 book by David Baddiel

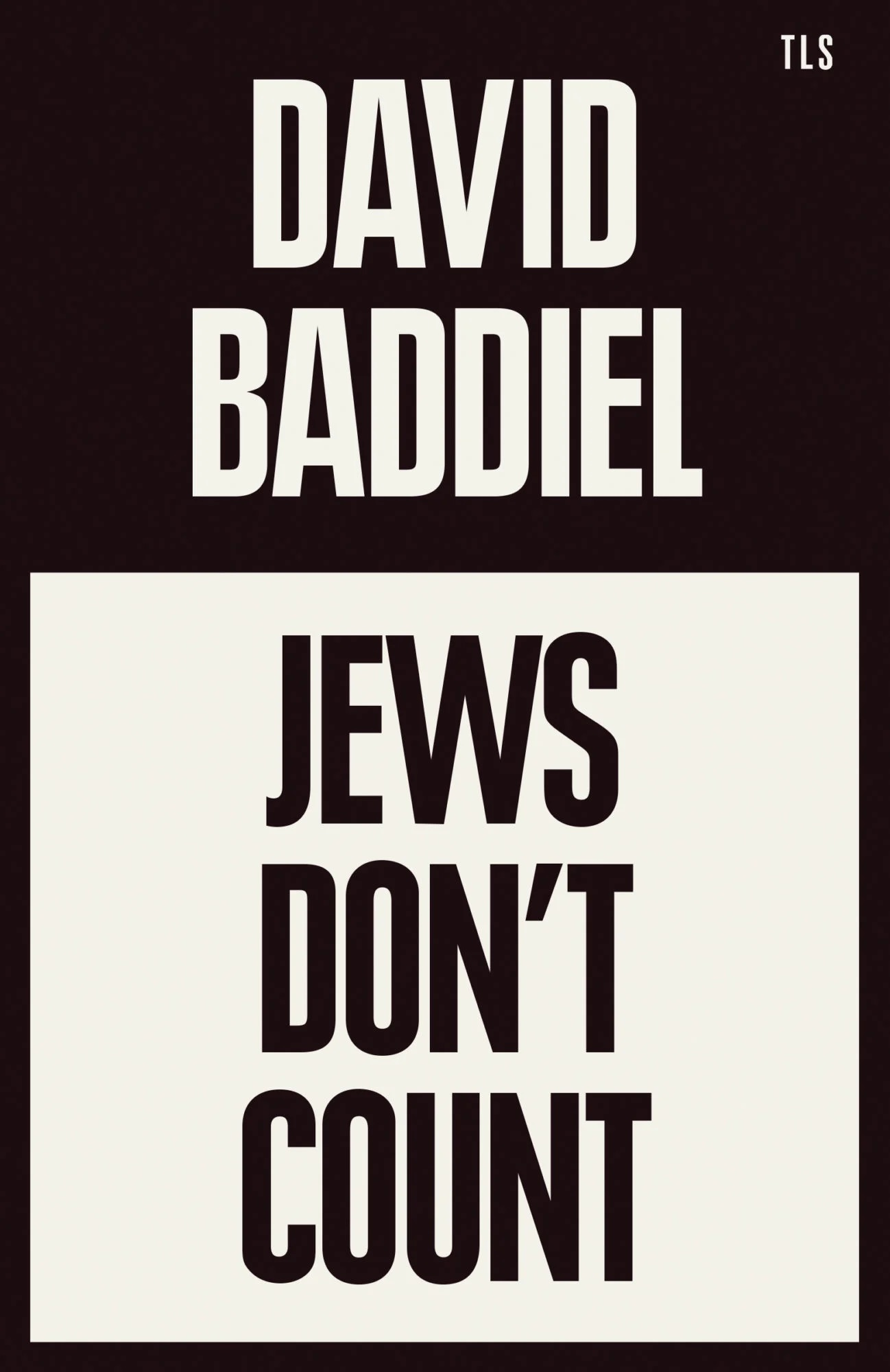
- First edition cover
- Author: David Baddiel
- Language: English
- Subject: New antisemitism
- Genre: Polemic
- Published: 2021
- Publisher: TLS Books
- Publication date: 4 February 2021
- Publication place: United Kingdom
- Media type: Print (Hardback)
- Pages: 144
- ISBN: 0008399476
- Dewey Decimal: 305.8924

Jews Don't Count: How Identity Politics Failed One Particular Identity is a book by English comedian David Baddiel. First published on 4 February 2021 by TLS Books, the book discusses the status of antisemitism, particularly in left-wing politics. Baddiel argues that antisemitism is treated differently from other forms of racism, creating double standards and discrimination against Jews. The book covers a range of topics related to modern antisemitism and Jewish identity, including under-representation in popular media, relationships with Israel and Zionism, and the status of Jews as a minority group.

In 2022, a documentary adaptation of the book was released on British television channel Channel 4 under the title David Baddiel: Jews Don't Count. In the documentary, Baddiel interviewed several Jewish celebrities and discussed similar topics to the original book. Both the book and documentary received mostly positive reviews, being especially well-received by the Jewish and Israel-related press. However, several reviewers criticised Baddiel for his arguments around race and white privilege.

== Background ==
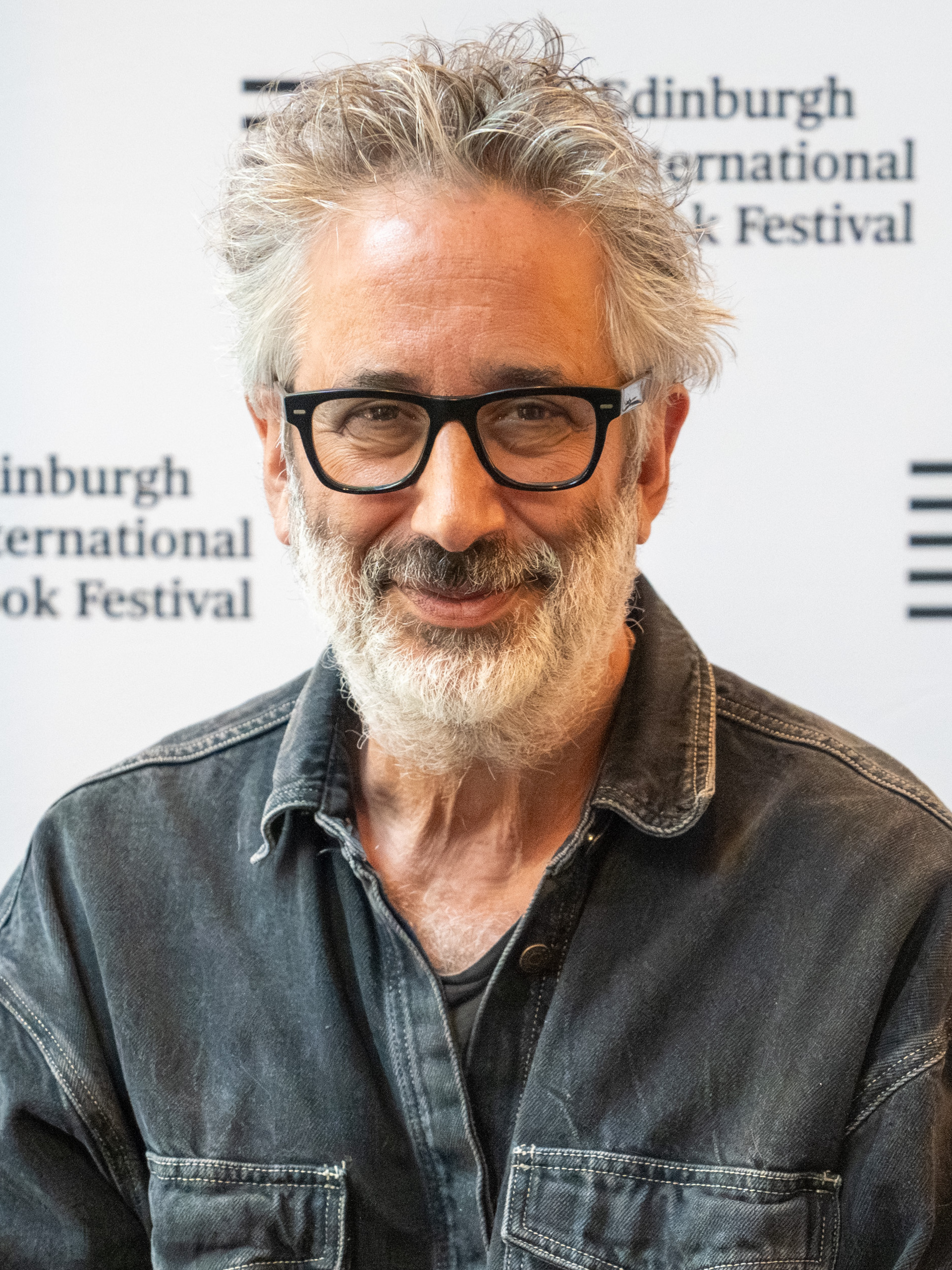
David Baddiel at the 2025 Edinburgh International Book Festival

David Baddiel is a British comedian, presenter, screenwriter, and author. Born to Jewish parents, Baddiel attended the North West London Jewish Day School in childhood. He identifies as a Jewish atheist, and has previously given interviews about the topic of Israel and antisemitism. Before Jews Don't Count, Baddiel had released other material relating to Judaism; his 2010 film The Infidel centres around the theme of Jewish identity.

== Synopsis ==
In Jews Don't Count, Baddiel argues that progressives view the minority status of Jews differently from other ethnic minorities, and thus antisemitism is viewed differently from other forms of racism. He writes that antisemitism has become a "second-class racism".

In the opening of the book, Baddiel describes a lack of attention towards antisemitism in literature, the film industry, and politics. According to Baddiel, this creates double standards. He then discusses antisemitism in football, using the example of the use of the pejorative term "Yid" by Tottenham Hotspur FC. Baddiel also argues that under-representation of Jews in media is a form of modern antisemitism. He examines the viewpoint that Jews cannot be an oppressed group, and says that this stems from stereotypes of Jews, such as the idea that Jews are wealthy and powerful. He argues that these stereotypes align Jews with oppressive groups, allowing discrimination against them to be overlooked. Baddiel writes about the relationship between Jews and white privilege, which he argues has the potential to provide security against appearance-based racism. He also discusses the neo-Nazi view that Jews are Asiatic.

Baddiel argues that the casting of non-Jewish actors to play Jewish roles shows that Jews are under-represented in media, saying that this form of casting is dangerous due to the potential for antisemitic portrayals of Jews by these actors. Baddiel also explores how Jewish actors hide their Jewish heritage for fear of discrimination, using examples such as Natalie Portman. He contends that this is extremely rare for people of other ethnic backgrounds. The status of Jews as BAME (black, Asian and minority ethnic; a form of minority group racial classification in the United Kingdom) is discussed, and Baddiel states that Nigel Lawson was the first BAME Chancellor of the Exchequer, as opposed to Sajid Javid. He also considers the potential use of the word Jew as a pejorative, as opposed to other phrases.

Baddiel talks about his relationship with Zionism and Israel as a British Jew, disagreeing with Zionist perspectives. He argues that the expectation that non-Israeli Jews are Zionists is a form of antisemitism, and that guilt felt by left-wing Western Jews towards the actions of Israel is a form of internalised racism. Antisemitism in the British Labour Party is discussed, as well as its use by opposing parties to avoid questioning. Baddiel concludes the polemic with the view that, while attitudes towards Jews have improved in the years leading up to the book, Jews nevertheless still experience marginalisation.

== Publication ==
The first hardback and ebook editions of Jews Don't Count were published on 4 February 2021 by TLS Books, an imprint of American publishing house HarperCollins. The book was originally intended to be released in December 2020; Baddiel had starting writing the book in 2019. On 2 February 2022, a paperback edition of the book was released, again by TLS. The first edition of the book had 144 pages, which increased to 160 in the second edition. A German translation, titled Und die Juden? (transl. And the Jews?), was released in October 2022 by Carl Hanser. A Portuguese translation, entitled Os Judeus Não Contam (lit. 'The Jews Don't Count') was released in April 2022 by Vogais, an imprint of Penguin Random House.

== Reception ==
Jews Don't Count attracted attention from mainstream media and was met with mostly positive reviews. The i called the book "a searing look at why anti-Semitism is often seen as a lesser form of racism". Dominic Lawson, reviewing in The Times, described it as "a convincing and even devastating charge sheet"; the book was included on the newspaper's "12 best political and current affairs books 2021" and "best paperbacks of 2022" lists. The book was awarded The Sunday Times Politics Book of the Year in 2021.

Also in The Times, Stephen Bush was more negative. Bush, a Black British Jew, criticised Baddiel for his arguments about white privilege and for ignoring the positions of non-White Jews, writing: "He is so concerned with asserting his own lack of privilege that he forgets his obligations to others... It's an argument that would struggle to survive a conversation with more than three people from any other minority... it fails at its central mission and lets the left-wing antisemite off the hook."

Writing for the Higher Education Policy Institute, Nick Hillman gave the book a mixed review, writing that it was "more like an extended essay than a full-length book". He also criticised the style of prose, writing: "The text is unpolished in places, and the numerous chatty asides in the footnotes leave the impression that the author could not be bothered to weave some of his thoughts into the main text." However, Hillman also praised the book for its discourse, saying that "if the sign of a good book is that it makes you think, then this is a very very good book."

The book was especially praised by Jewish and Israel-related organisations. Sarah Annes Brown of the Britain Israel Communications and Research Centre's Fathom journal described the book as "a powerful and personal contribution to the debates around antisemitism on the left", the Jewish Book Council called it a "mini masterpiece", and The Jerusalem Post wrote that "while witty, it’s serious, with some outrage". In Jewish Review of Books, Jewish American novelist Dara Horn offered a mixed review, stating that "Many passages in this book feel less like well-argued prose or a well-told story than like a hastily written email, or notes for a stand-up act, or a Twitter thread". Horn also stated that she was "endlessly grateful" that Baddiel wrote the book. Jeremy Havardi of Jewish News likewise gave a mixed review, writing that the "book is an engaging polemic, providing a witty and intellectually nimble riposte" but stated that Baddiel "ducks the challenge" of fully addressing the Jewish nature of the state of Israel in relation to Zionism. In a review of the book in The Jewish Chronicle, Josh Glancy called the book "totemic", but disagreed with the book's argument that "Jews need to be readmitted to the left's hierarchy of victimhood", writing, "Let's not make Jewface a thing and start building thick walls around our identity."

== Documentary adaptation ==
On 17 May 2022, Channel 4 announced intentions to create a documentary version of the book entitled David Baddiel: Jews Don't Count. The documentary was broadcast publicly on 21 November 2022, and was directed by James Routh. Louis Theroux and Nina Davies were executive producers, with Alex Emanuel and Rachel Duncan as producer and production manager, respectively. The documentary was produced by Mindhouse Productions. Baddiel intended for the documentary to reach a non-Jewish audience, "particularly ones who see themselves... as anti-racist", and brought high-profile Jewish figures into the documentary partly to achieve better ratings and thereby better deliver the documentary to his intended audience.

The documentary included a series of interviews with various Jewish celebrities, including David Schwimmer, Sarah Silverman, Stephen Fry, Jonathan Safran Foer, Dara Horn, Howard Jacobson, Neil Gaiman, and Miriam Margolyes. Baddiel discussed various topics in the documentary, including Jewish history, antisemitic violence, Jewface, and the casting of non-Jewish actors to play Jewish roles. Baddiel also discussed issues related to Israel with several of his interviewees. He interviewed his niece, who is biracial, about antisemitism as a form of racism. Baddiel interviewed footballer Jason Lee and apologised for a 1990s sketch in which he mocked Lee in blackface.

Baddiel discussed the documentary at the Paley Center for Media in New York City in 2024.

The documentary is available on Channel 4's streaming service in the U.K. In the U.S. the documentary is available via the BBC Select streaming channel on Amazon Prime Video.

=== Reception of documentary ===
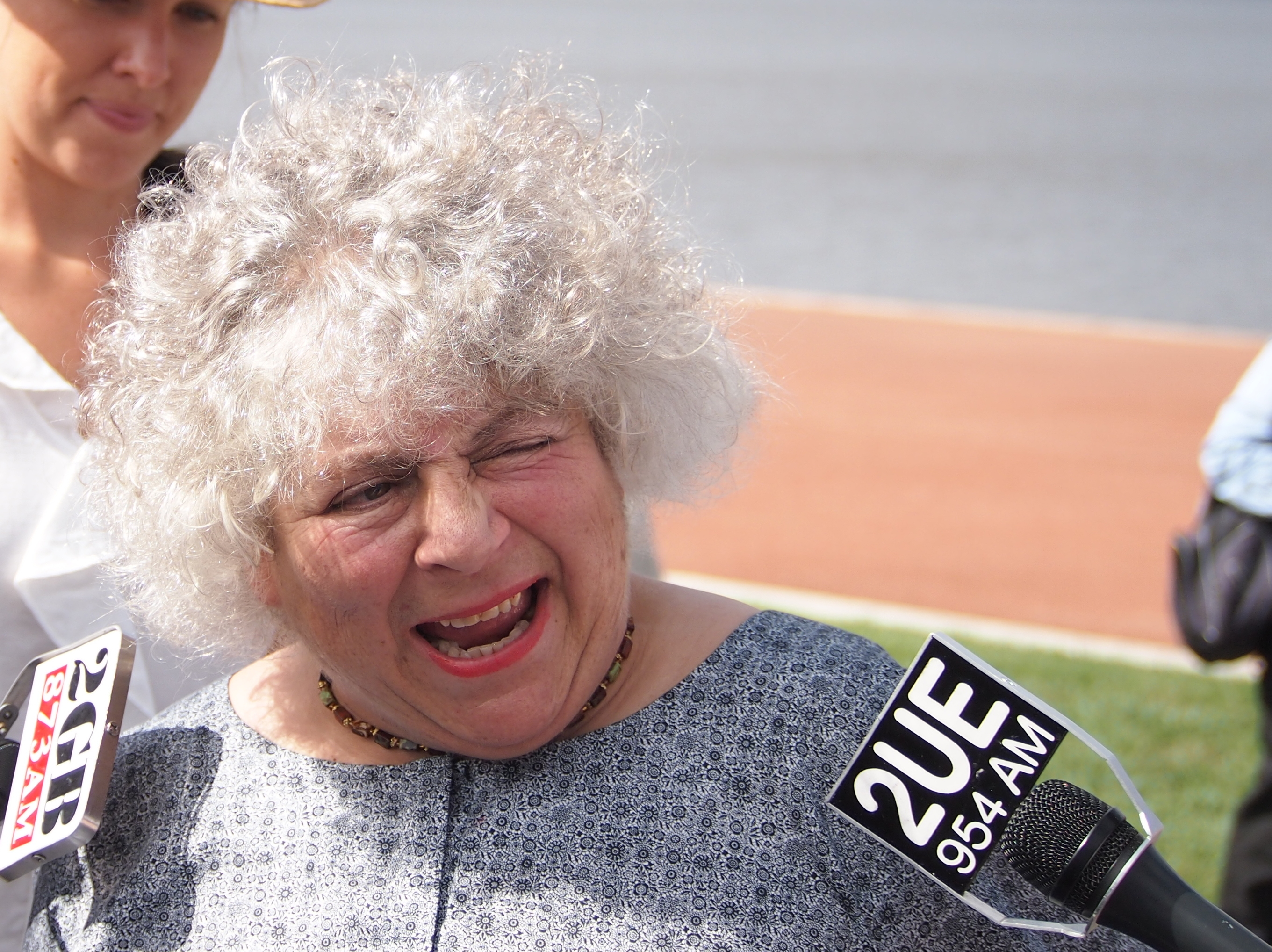
Miriam Margolyes was interviewed in David Baddiel: Jews Don't Count.

David Baddiel: Jews Don't Count received mixed reviews. Rebecca Nicholson, writing in The Guardian, called it "a doc so shocking it sounds like a siren", praising the conversational tone of the documentary. Josh Howie in The Jewish Chronicle likewise praised the documentary, but also criticised elements: "Yes there’s the usual cop out about Israel, yes I don’t think Miriam Margolyes should be anywhere near a documentary about antisemitism". Ben Dowell gave a largely positive review in The Times, writing that "there were times when it felt almost in danger of becoming relentlessly irrefutable", and Dan Einav of The Financial Times similarly praised the documentary, but noted a lack of direct interview of "someone who represents the left-wing indifference or obliviousness towards Jews which he discusses".

A review in The New Statesman by Emily Hilton said that "this documentary... failed to define what is actually meant by 'progressive' ", writing that Baddiel's argument failed to offer a solution to antisemitism and "separates Jews from the conversation [of anti-racism]". Rivkah Brown of Novara Media wrote about Baddiel's insensitivity to the difficulties faced by Jews of colour in an "awkward exchange" with his niece, a Black Jew, and stated "[anti-racism]’s the kind of work done in pubs, not from podiums – and it doesn’t make very good TV." Negative reviewers of the documentary also included Eli Spitzer in Mosaic, who called the documentary a "weak and frivolous exercise in moaning". Spitzer disliked Baddiel's discussions of whiteness, writing that "It is impossible to overstate the degree to which David Baddiel wants you to know that, despite what your lying eyes might indicate, he is not white". Spitzer also noted the film's lack of representation of Israeli, religiously observant, or Zionist Jews, writing: "He thus deemphasizes or excludes something like 80 percent of the Jewish people from his analysis. The only time we see a yarmulke is in the background when Baddiel visits a New York deli and observes that Jews like pickles."

Anita Singh of The Telegraph gave the documentary three out of five stars, calling it a "slick, well-argued film" but criticising Baddiel's coverage of Lee. Other reviewers such as Nicholson also disliked this, with Nicholson writing that it "belong[s] more to a story about Baddiel as a public figure than to the rest of this film".

== See also ==
- The Left's Jewish Problem—2016 book about antisemitism in left wing politics of the United Kingdom
- "'Progressive' Jewish Thought and the New Anti-Semitism"—2006 essay about the relationship between new antisemitism and Zionism
