= The Infidel (2010 film) =

2010 British comedy film

- Theatrical release poster
- Directed by: Josh Appignanesi
- Written by: David Baddiel
- Produced by: Arvind Ethan David
- Starring: Omid Djalili; Richard Schiff; Archie Panjabi; Amit Kaushik Shah; Yigal Naor; Matt Lucas; Ricky Sekhon
- Cinematography: Natasha Braier
- Edited by: Kim Gaster
- Music by: Erran Baron Cohen
- Production companies: Slingshot Productions; Met Film Production
- Distributed by: Revolver
- Release date: 9 April 2010
- Running time: 105 minutes
- Country: United Kingdom
- Language: English
- Box office: £1.7 million

The Infidel is a 2010 British comedy film directed by Josh Appignanesi and written by David Baddiel. It stars Omid Djalili, Richard Schiff, Yigal Naor, and Matt Lucas. The film revolves around a British Muslim man who goes through an identity crisis when he discovers that he was adopted as a baby and born to a Jewish family.

== Plot ==
Mahmud Nasir is a husband, father and a British Muslim who listens to rock music, particularly the long deceased pop star Gary Page, and occasionally drinks alcohol. His son, Rashid, wishes to marry his fiancee Uzma, but they need the blessing of her devout Muslim cleric stepfather, Arshad Al-Masri (Yigal Naor), something Mahmud is initially resistant towards, given Al-Masri's supposed links to Islamic extremists. However, he agrees to put on the act of devout Muslim for the occasion.

Mahmud, while clearing out his recently deceased mother's house, stumbles across an adoption certificate with his name on it. He later learns he was actually adopted by his Muslim parents when he was two weeks old; his birth parents were Jewish, and his real name is Solomon "Solly" Shimshillewitz. This comes as a shock to Mahmud, who is somewhat anti-Semitic, exemplified by his relationship with his American Jewish neighbour, Leonard "Lenny" Goldberg.

During an argument with Lenny, Mahmud lets slip his ethnicity and his real name, and Lenny mentions a similarity to the name, Isaac "Izzy" Shimshillewitz, a local man, who may be Mahmud's biological father. Mahmud tracks his father to a Jewish old age home. He tries to visit, but a rabbi refuses him entry, saying it would be a shock for Izzy, a Jewish man, to see his son, a Muslim, and advises him to learn to act more like a Jew if he desires to see his father before he dies.

Lenny agrees to teach Mahmud what he knows about being a Jew, such as dancing like Topol and learning basic Yiddish, but the frequent trips to Lenny's house arouse Mahmud's family's suspicions, especially when Mahmud's kippah is spotted during a Free Palestine rally. Mahmud publicly burns the kippah in desperation as a symbol of his supposed hatred of Zionism. Mahmud later attends a bar mitzvah with Lenny and unintentionally tells a very crude joke to the audience in broken Yiddish, only to be greeted with laughter from the attendees. Mahmud and Lenny attempt to see Izzy, but the rabbi still refuses to let Mahmud inside when he cannot say his Jewish Sh'ma or name the Five Books of Moses in Hebrew.

Mahmud and Lenny have a bitter argument and Mahmud storms off, vowing to tell his family the truth immediately, but when he gets home, he sees that Arshad, Uzma and their friends are already there. Arshad, impressed with Mahmud's supposed devotion to Islam after seeing him burn the kippah on TV, gives his blessing to Rashid and Uzma's union, but the police arrive, along with the media and a crowd of angry Jews and supportive Muslims, to arrest Mahmud for burning the kippah. In desperation, he yells out in front of everyone that he is Jewish, exonerating him of the crime. A disgusted Arshad leaves with Uzma and his friends.

Mahmud's family leaves him for his dishonesty, one of his colleagues at work resigns, and he starts drinking. He becomes increasingly despondent, but is rescued by Lenny, who saw his announcement on the news. Mahmud goes to the old age home and demands to see his father, but learns that his father has already died. Mahmud is allowed inside Izzy's room where he finds a video of his announcement in Izzy's video machine, which Lenny had sent Izzy. Mahmud's only solace is a sticker on the video with the name "Solly" on it, indicating that even after all these years, Izzy still remembered his long-lost son.

Mahmud appears at Arshad's next rally and delivers a speech on behalf of himself, Jewish citizens and Muslims. Mahmud also tells the crowd of another discovery which he's made: Arshad is actually Gary Page, who staged his own death following his fall from fame after a racist rant while on stage, resurfacing much later with a whole new identity as a devout Muslim cleric. Arshad escapes from the rally, comically dressed in his old Gary Page clothes. Rashid and Uzma are married, with the wedding attended by both Muslims and Jews while Lenny has taken a job with the mostly-Muslim taxi firm at which Mahmud works.

== Cast ==
- Omid Djalili as Mahmud Nasir/Solomon "Solly" Shimshillewitz
- Yigal Naor as Arshad Al-Masri
- Matt Lucas as Rabbi
- Amit Shah as Rashid
- Soraya Radford as Uzma
- Archie Panjabi as Saamiya Nasir
- Richard Schiff as Lenny Goldberg
- Miranda Hart as Mrs Keyes
- David Schneider as Monty
- Tracy-Ann Oberman as Monty's wife
- Mina Anwar as Muna
- James Floyd as Gary Page
- Shobu Kapoor as Kashmina
- Sartaj Garewal as Wasif
- Ricky Sekhon as Hazeem

== Production ==
David Baddiel wrote The Infidel because he has "always been a fan of life-swap comedy (Big, Trading Places, etc)"; he "think[s] that people are terrified about race and religion, especially issues surrounding Muslims and Jews, and when people are terrified, what they really should do is laugh"; and he "love[s] Omid Djalili and his big funny face. [He's] hoping that people recognise that underneath the comedy, the message of the film is one of mutual tolerance: if not, [He's] hoping to find a new identity."

BBC Films helped develop the film's script. They withdrew shortly after the "Sachsgate" scandal, in which the BBC were criticised for offensive content.

== Release ==
The film was released 9 April 2010 in the United Kingdom. Distribution rights to the film were sold to 62 countries, including many Arab and Muslim countries such as the United Arab Emirates, Bahrain, Qatar, Lebanon, Oman, Iran and Saudi Arabia. The film has been shown in Iran but was not picked up by Israeli distributors.

== Critical reception ==
60% of the 25 approved Rotten Tomatoes critics gave the film a positive review.

In 2011, the film was in consideration to be adapted into a sitcom by NBC.

== Stage musical adaptation ==
A stage musical adaptation with book and lyrics by David Baddiel and music by Ethan Barron Cohen, with additional material and produced by Arvind Ethan David was announced as a Kickstarter project. The musical later opened at the Theatre Royal Stratford East directed by the Artistic Director, Kerry Michael. It ran from 4 October to 3 November 2014, before being extended to 15 November.

== Indian remake ==
The film was remade in India under the title Dharam Sankat Mein (crisis of faith), with the same basic premise, of a man raised Hindu finding out he was born into a Muslim family. It stars Paresh Rawal, Annu Kapoor, and Naseeruddin Shah in the lead roles.

== See also ==
- Jews Don't Count
- The Great Indian Family
