= David Baddiel =

English comedian and writer (born 1964)

David Baddiel FRSL
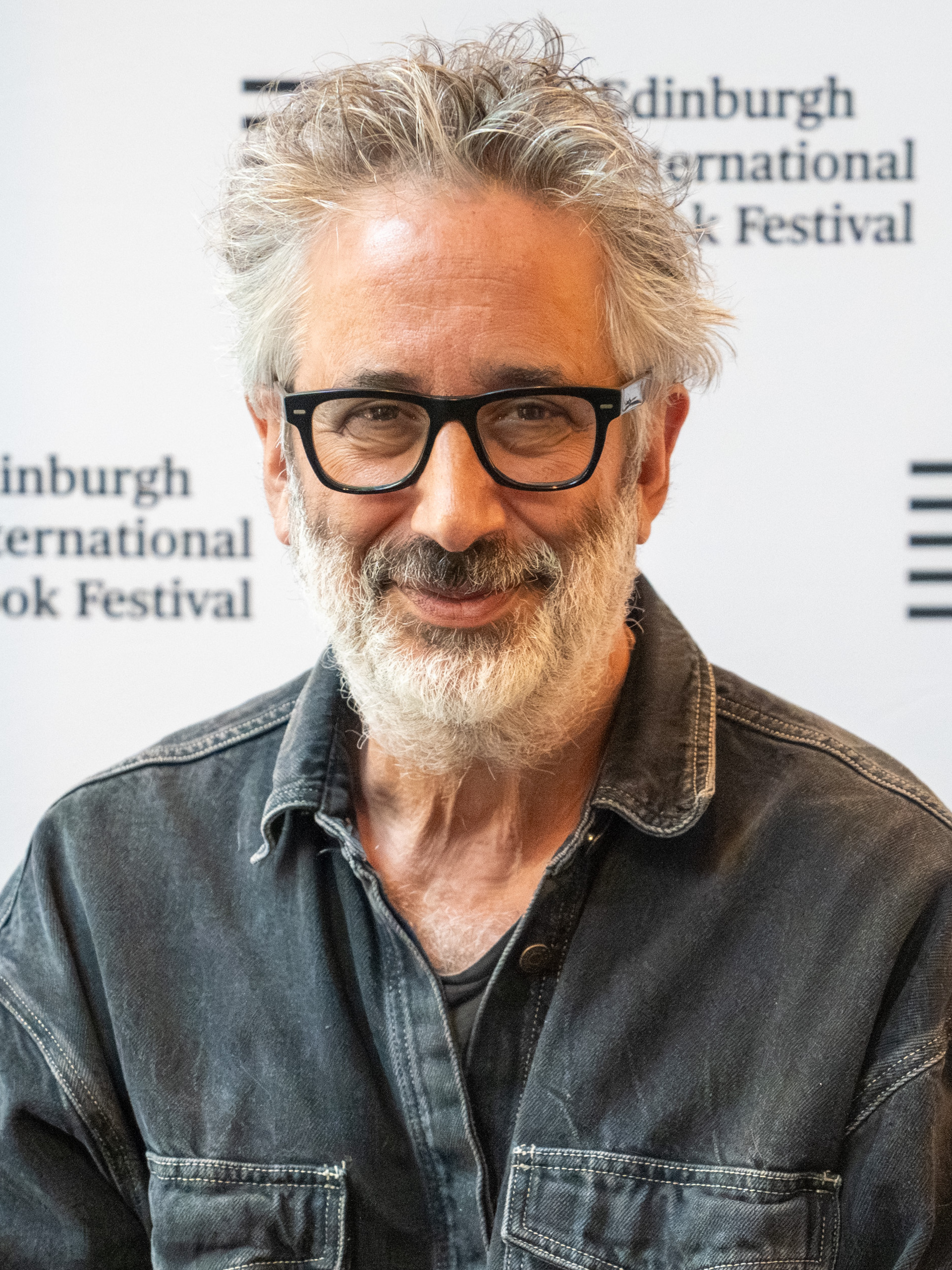
- Baddiel in 2025
- Born: David Lionel Baddiel; 28 May 1964 (age 62); Troy, New York, US
- Education: King's College, Cambridge (BA)
- Occupations: Comedian; presenter; screenwriter; author
- Spouse: Morwenna Banks (m. 2017)
- Children: 2

Comedy career
- Years active: 1984–present
- Medium: Film; stand-up; television
- Genre: Satire observational comedy
- Subjects: Human interaction; sex; football; religion

David Lionel Baddiel (/bəˈdiːl/; born 28 May 1964) is an English comedian, presenter, screenwriter and author. He became known for his early work alongside Rob Newman in The Mary Whitehouse Experience and later for his comedy partnership with Frank Skinner.

He has written the children's books The Parent Agency, The Person Controller, AniMalcolm, Birthday Boy, Head Kid, and The Taylor TurboChaser. He is also a lyricist on "Three Lions", a song that has been described as the de facto "anthem" of English football since 1996.

In 2024, he filmed his trilogy of specials "Not The" at the Royal Court Theatre for Sky Arts in February. He also launched his podcast, "A Muslim and a Jew Go There" with Sayeeda Warsi, Baroness Warsi and filmed a travelogue with Hugh Dennis, "Two Men on a Bike" released in 2025.

== Early life ==
David Lionel Baddiel was born on 28 May 1964 in Troy, New York, to parents from the UK who were living in the US He moved to England with his family when he was four months old. His father, Colin Brian Baddiel, came from a working-class Swansea family, of Ashkenazi Jewish background; he worked as a research chemist with Unilever before being made redundant in the 1980s, after which he sold Dinky Toys at Grays Antique Market. His mother, Sarah (Fabian), was born in Nazi Germany, to a Jewish family. She was five months old when she was taken to England by her parents in 1939 after the family had fled Nazi Germany, where her wealthy father had been stripped of his assets as a victim of Kristallnacht. Soon after their arrival in the United Kingdom, her father was interned as an "enemy alien" on the Isle of Man for a year. Baddiel's grandfather had mental health issues, sometimes requiring hospitalisation, for the rest of his life. Baddiel said in 2022 that he had been parented by his elder brother Ivor, as "my dad was unemployed and angry, while my mum was distracted by her passionate affair". An episode of the BBC genealogy series Who Do You Think You Are? investigated Baddiel's heritage in some detail, but failed to prove his theory that his mother had been secretly adopted from another Jewish family who had no hope of escaping.

Baddiel grew up in the Dollis Hill area of London alongside his two brothers Ivor and Dan (one older, one younger). Ivor is a writer. Baddiel attended the North West London Jewish Day School in Brent, and the public school Haberdashers' Aske's Boys' School in Elstree. He studied English at King's College, Cambridge, where he was a member of the Cambridge Footlights, and graduated with a double first BA. He began studies for a PhD in English at University College London, but did not complete it.

== Career ==
=== The Mary Whitehouse Experience and Newman and Baddiel ===
After leaving university, Baddiel became a professional stand-up comedian in London, as well as a writer for acts such as Rory Bremner and series including Spitting Image. His first television appearance came in one episode of the showbiz satire Filthy Rich and Catflap. In 1988 he was introduced to Rob Newman, and the two formed a writing partnership. Subsequently, paired up with Steve Punt and Hugh Dennis, another comedy duo, they began writing and performing in The Mary Whitehouse Experience on BBC Radio 1, where the show ran for four series and a special. This success led the show to transfer to BBC2, where it ran for two series, after which both duos decided to end the show. During this time, Baddiel also co-hosted the Channel 4 programme A Stab in the Dark.

After The Mary Whitehouse Experience, Baddiel and Newman re-teamed up for Newman and Baddiel in Pieces, which ran for seven episodes on BBC2, featuring character sketches, monologues, and observation routines. Despite a fraught working relationship, the show saw Newman and Baddiel find enormous success as live performers, held up as examples of comedy as ‘the new rock ’n’ roll’, with their tour (Newman and Baddiel: Live and In Pieces) culminating in the first-ever sold-out gig for a comedy act at Wembley Arena, playing to 12,500 people. Despite this success, increasing tension between the pair led to them announcing the tour would be their last together. Their final tour was the subject of a BBC2 documentary, Newman and Baddiel on the Road to Wembley.

=== Collaboration with Frank Skinner ===
Baddiel subsequently met and began sharing a flat with fellow comedian Frank Skinner. Both lifelong football fans (Baddiel is a Chelsea F.C. fan), the pair created, wrote and performed Fantasy Football League, a popular entertainment show based on fantasy football. Running for three series on BBC2, followed by a series of live specials throughout the 1998 World Cup and then again through the 2004 European Championship, as well as a series of podcasts for The Times from Germany at the 2006 World Cup, and another series for Absolute Radio from South Africa during the 2010 World Cup (amassing over three million downloads). During this time the duo also twice topped the UK Singles Chart with the football anthem "Three Lions", co-written and performed with The Lightning Seeds.

The song was originally written as the England football team's official anthem for UEFA Euro 1996 and was re-recorded with updated lyrics as the unofficial anthem for the 1998 World Cup. The song continues to be popular with England fans and returned to the charts in July 2018, celebrating the progress of the England national football team at the 2018 FIFA World Cup with the phrase "it's coming home" featuring heavily on social media and television.

Baddiel received criticism for his impression of black footballer Jason Lee in Fantasy Football League in the 1990s, which involved him wearing a pineapple on his head and using blackface. Lee said he considered this a form of bullying. Baddiel has issued a number of apologies on social media and in an article for The Daily Telegraph, saying it was "part of a very bad racist tradition". Lee said in 2020 that he had not received a direct apology from Baddiel or Skinner over the series of sketches, but in 2022, Baddiel met Lee to apologise in his Channel 4 documentary.

In his 2021 book Jews Don't Count, Baddiel said that, despite apologising for the Jason Lee impression "on various occasions", people, particularly on social media, continued to share it in order to silence him:

They want me to shut up, particularly about anti-Semitism. As far as they are concerned, the photo of me as Jason Lee is a trump card that means I cannot speak about racism, even the racism that threatens me personally.

After ending Fantasy Football League, the pair took an improvised question-and-answer show to the Edinburgh Fringe which then became a television series, Baddiel and Skinner Unplanned, which ran for five series on ITV, as well as a West End run at the Shaftesbury Theatre in 2001.

The pair also appeared on a celebrity special of Who Wants to Be a Millionaire? in 2001, becoming the first celebrity contestants to reach £250,000 for their charities, the Catholic Children's Society and the Imperial Cancer Research Fund.

In February 2022, a clip emerged from Baddiel's 2004 guest appearance on The Frank Skinner Show. In the clip, Baddiel uses "pikey", a pejorative term used to refer to people who are of a Traveller community, to negatively denote his own appearance. Critics accused Baddiel of hypocrisy given his own polemic, Jews Don't Count.

=== Solo work ===
Baddiel has written four novels: Time for Bed (1996), Whatever Love Means (2002), The Secret Purposes (2006), and The Death of Eli Gold (2011). In June 2015, he published his first children's novel, The Parent Agency, which won the LOLLIE award (the successor to the Roald Dahl Funny Book Awards) for "Best Laugh Out Loud Book for 9–13-Year-Olds" and is set to be developed into a feature film (also written and produced by Baddiel) through Fox 2000 Pictures. His subsequent children's novels include The Person Controller (2015), AniMalcolm (2016), Birthday Boy (2017) and Head Kid (2018). He wrote The Boy Who Could Do What He Liked, a short story published for World Book Day in 2016.

In 2001, Baddiel wrote and starred in Baddiel's Syndrome, a sitcom for Sky One which also starred Morwenna Banks, Stephen Fry and Jonathan Bailey, which ran for fourteen episodes. He also wrote the comedy film, The Infidel, starring Omid Djalili, Richard Schiff, Matt Lucas and Miranda Hart. Baddiel has since adapted the film into a musical with music by Erran Baron Cohen. Baddiel directed the production which ran at London's Theatre Royal Stratford East in late 2014. Baddiel's other writing credits include The Norris McWhirter Chronicles for Sky 1, which starred Alistair McGowan and John Thomson and which Baddiel also directed, and two episodes of the ITV reboot of Thunderbirds, Thunderbirds Are Go!

In 2004, Baddiel created and hosted Heresy, a BBC Radio 4 panel show which sees celebrity guests trying to overthrow popular prejudice and received wisdom. The show is currently in its 10th series and has been hosted by Victoria Coren since 2008, with Baddiel returning regularly as a guest. In 2014 Baddiel created and hosted Don't Make Me Laugh, a new panel show for Radio 4 that tasks guests with talking for as long as possible on obviously humorous subjects without getting laughs. The second series aired in 2016. In 2015, he created and fronted David Baddiel Tries to Understand..., a BBC Radio 4 show which sees Baddiel try to understand famously complex subjects as suggested by his followers on Twitter, and has now run for three series.

Baddiel has appeared in shows including Little Britain, Skins, The Life of Rock with Brian Pern and Horrible Histories and is a regular guest on panel shows including 8 Out of 10 Cats Does Countdown, QI and Alan Davies’ As Yet Untitled. In 2016, he fronted a four-part travel documentary for Discovery entitled David Baddiel On the Silk Road, a 4,000-mile journey to explore the most famous trade route in history, as well as presenting two episodes of BBC2's Artsnight and becoming a regular presenter of The Penguin Podcast in which he interviews authors about the objects that inspired their books, which has seen him interview guests including Johnny Marr, Zadie Smith and Ruby Wax. Other documentaries he has fronted include Baddiel and the Missing Nazi Billions (BBC2), Who Do You Want Your Child to Be? (BBC2), World's Most Dangerous Roads (BBC2), and an episode of Who Do You Think You Are? (BBC1). He appeared on Desert Island Discs in 2018.

Baddiel filmed a documentary about his father's dementia, The Trouble with Dad, shown on Channel 4 in 2017.

In 2019 Baddiel featured in Taskmaster series 9. He won one episode and finished fifth out of five in the overall series.

In January 2021, it was announced Baddiel would appear as a contestant on the 4th series of The Great Stand Up to Cancer Bake Off, which aired in Spring 2021.

=== Stand-up ===
In 2013, he returned to stand-up comedy with his critically acclaimed show Fame (Not the Musical), which ran at the Edinburgh Festival Fringe before transferring to London's Menier Chocolate Factory and a subsequent nationwide tour. In Spring 2016 Baddiel premiered a new show, My Family: Not the Sitcom, again at the Menier Chocolate Factory; the confessional show tells the true story of Baddiel's recently deceased mother and dementia-suffering father.

Following a five-week run, the show transferred to London's West End in September 2016 for another five-week run at the Vaudeville Theatre. In spring 2017 it was announced that the show would return to the West End for one final ten-week run at the Playhouse Theatre in March 2017. In the same month, it was announced that the show was nominated for an Olivier Award, in The Entertainment and Family category. Rob Newman saw one of these performances, the first time the two had been in the same room since 1993. The show was performed as part of the Montreal Comedy Festival in 2017 and toured the UK in 2018. Baddiel took the show to a four-city tour of Australia. His show about social media, Trolls: Not The Dolls, toured the UK in 2020.

=== Plays and books ===
In October 2019 Baddiel's play God's Dice was produced at the Soho Theatre, London. The title is an allusion to Einstein's view of quantum uncertainty: "God does not play dice with the universe". The work deals with "an ageing [quantum physicist] seduced into supporting a radical religious sect".

Baddiel has written books for both adults and children and was elected a fellow of the Royal Society of Literature in 2019.

=== TV at Channel 4 ===
In November 2022 Baddiel fronted a Channel 4 documentary David Baddiel: Jews Don't Count. The Guardian TV section summed it up as:

Baddiel focuses on the ideas that formed his 2021 book of the same title. His central thesis is that "Jews don't count as a proper minority" when it comes to contemporary notions of prejudice and racism. He sets out to explore why so many people seem to ignore antisemitism, as well as "the dysfunction between progressives and Jews".

The Financial Times review remarked:

That Baddiel and Channel 4 have already received a torrent of scorn online for making the programme only serves to highlight its importance.

== Political views and philanthropy ==
=== Politics ===
Baddiel is a Labour Party voter, but does not describe himself as a "Labour supporter". He has said, "I would never support a political party like that, regardless of what I believe personally. My job is to be funny and that might involve me being funny at the expense of whoever's stepped in shit that week."

In February 2016, Baddiel commented on the election of Jeremy Corbyn as Labour leader: "I think it's interesting to think that we've got a proper left-wing Labour politician. My main thing about Corbyn is I think the scaremongering about him by the right-wing press is so absurd it makes me want to support Corbyn, even though in some ways I might not. Some of the people around him I personally wouldn't trust but I think he himself is a decent man."

In April 2017, Baddiel wrote an article for The Guardian in which he was critical of Ken Livingstone's comments regarding Adolf Hitler and Zionism; however Baddiel also made it clear that he was not a Zionist himself, and that he disagreed with "religion being the basis for statehood" and "the appalling actions of the present Israeli government".

In March 2018, Baddiel appeared on Daily Politics, in which he described antisemitism as "sort of invisible" to Corbyn and others on the political left because they are focused on "fighting the good fight against capitalism".

In February 2020, he explored, via his BBC documentary, the subject of Confronting Holocaust Denial. In an interview, he told The Guardian that Holocaust denial is "a direct way of saying Jews are liars, Jews have tricked the world for their own gain, Jews are the most evil, pernicious race that exist". He further said, "It is hate speech. There's no other conclusion."

In February 2021, Baddiel's non-fiction book Jews Don't Count was published by The Times Literary Supplement. The book asserts that double standards are extensively employed (either knowingly or unknowingly) by anti-racists when dealing with antisemitism, stating that "a sacred circle is drawn around those whom the progressive modern left are prepared to go into battle for, and it seems as if the Jews aren't in it". Much of the book consists of examples which Baddiel argues are evidence that such progressives have a blind spot when it comes to antisemitism.

In 2024, Baddiel launched his podcast "A Muslim and a Jew Go There" with Sayeeda Warsi.

=== Charity ===
Baddiel is a patron of Humanists UK and the Campaign Against Living Miserably (CALM). He acted as compere for the Stand-Up to Stop Suicide event organised by Claire Anstey and the charity, and has appeared on radio advertisements publicising the issue of young male suicide.

In February 2009, Baddiel and several other entertainers wrote an open letter in The Times supporting leaders of the Baháʼí Faith who were then on trial in Iran. Following his experiences with his father, Baddiel has worked closely with a number of charities supporting the victims of dementia and their families. He performed a special one-off charity gala of his My Family: Not the Sitcom show at the Vaudeville Theatre, with all proceeds from the evening being split between the Alzheimer's Society, the National Brain Appeal, and the Unforgettable Foundation. There were also collections made for the charities throughout the run of the show.

In 2017, it was announced that Baddiel would take part in Comic Relief's Red Nose Convoy, in which three pairs of celebrities travel in convoy from Kenya to Uganda while delivering aid. To benefit the cancer charity CLIC Sargent, Baddiel narrated the 2018 short film To Trend on Twitter with fellow comedians Reece Shearsmith, Steve Pemberton, and Helen Lederer, and actor Jason Flemyng. In March 2019, Baddiel hosted Comic Relief Does University Challenge on BBC One as part of Red Nose Day.

== Personal life ==
Baddiel has been in a relationship since 1998 with fellow comedian Morwenna Banks, and they married in 2017. They currently live in North London with their two children: a daughter named Dolly (b. 2001) and a son named Ezra (b. 2004). Despite his upbringing, he has described himself as a "10 out of 10 atheist" and as a Jewish atheist. He suffers from insomnia, about which he has written guest articles.

Baddiel is an avid fan of the rock band Genesis and introduced them at their Turn It On Again: The Tour press conference in 2006. He also provided sleeve notes for the reissue of the album Nursery Cryme as part of the Genesis 1970–1975 boxed set. He is a fan of the band's former lead singer Peter Gabriel, and a diarist for The Times once incorrectly reported that he had been "loud and offensive" while attending one of Gabriel's concerts, misidentifying musician Ian Broudie, something Baddiel has referred to in his live act. He is also a fan of David Bowie and marked Bowie's 65th birthday in 2012 by expressing a desire to see him come out of retirement. He attended the tribute concert to Bowie at London's Union Chapel following Bowie's death in 2016 and addressed the audience, describing Bowie as "the greatest tunesmith we have".

== Bibliography ==
Year	Title	Publisher	Illustrator	ISBN	Notes
1996	Time for Bed	Warner Books	N/A	9780751519785	
1999	Whatever Love Means	Little, Brown	N/A	9780316648578	
2004	The Secret Purposes	Little, Brown	N/A	9780349117461	
2011	The Death of Eli Gold	Fourth Estate	N/A	9780007292448	
2014	The Parent Agency	HarperCollins Children's Books	Jim Field	9780007554485	LOLLIE award winner
2015	The Person Controller	HarperCollins Children's Books	Jim Field	9780007554546	
2016	The Boy Who Could Do What He Liked	HarperCollins Children's Books	Jim Field	9780008164911	Published for World Book Day
2016	AniMalcolm	HarperCollins Children's Books	Jim Field	9780008185145	
2017	Birthday Boy	HarperCollins Children's Books	Jim Field	9780008200480	
2018	Head Kid	HarperCollins Children's Books	Steven Lenton	9780008200527	
2019	The Taylor Turbochaser	HarperCollins Children's Books	Steven Lenton	9780008334154	
2020	Future Friend	HarperCollins Children's Books	Steven Lenton	9780008334222	
2021	Jews Don't Count	TLS Books	N/A	9780008399474	
2021	The Boy Who Got Accidentally Famous	HarperCollins Children's Books	Steven Lenton	9780008334253	
2022	Virtually Christmas	HarperCollins Children's Books	Steven Lenton	9780008334307	
2023	The God Desire	TLS Books	N/A	9780008550288	
2024	My Family: The Memoir	Fourth Estate	N/A	9780008487607	

== Filmography ==
Year	Title	Role	Network	Notes
2004	Who Do You Think You Are?	Self	BBC Two	Series 1, episode 7
2020	Confronting Holocaust Denial with David Baddiel	Self	BBC Two	
2021	Jews Don't Count	Self	Channel 4	

Preceded by Chris Luscombe	Footlights Vice-President; 1985–1986	Succeeded by Ben Liston
