= Twyford Church of England Academies Trust =

School in United Kingdom

- Established: 2011
- Type: Multi-academy trust
- Location: Twyford Crescent, London. W3 9PP
- Coordinates: 51.5092°N 0.2788°W
- Key people: Dame Alice Hudson MA (Oxon) DBE
- Website: http://www.twyfordacademies.org.uk/

Twyford Church of England Academies Trust is a multi-academy trust based in West London and affiliated to the London Diocesan Board for Schools. It currently consists of four academies in the London Borough of Ealing: Twyford Church of England High School, William Perkin Church of England High School, Ada Lovelace Church of England High School and Ealing Fields High School. The trust, in partnership with the local authority, is the hub for the Ealing Teaching School Alliance (ETSA), an alliance of local schools.

== Description ==
Twyford Church of England Academies Trust was set up in October 2011 in order to allow the diocese to use the strengths built up at Twyford CofE High School to be developed beyond a single school. The school was a larger than the average-sized secondary school with approximately 1458 pupils on roll, including 500 pupils in the sixth form. It was significantly oversubscribed with over 600 applications in 2013 for 190 places. It has specialist status in music and modern foreign languages; 150 places are offered to foundation (Christian) applicants, 30 to applicants who satisfied the criteria for world faith and ten places were offered to students with an aptitude for music.

The inaugural Executive Head Teacher was Dame Alice Hudson. Hudson was made a Dame Commander of the Order of the British Empire (DBE) in the Queen's 2016 90th Birthday Honours for services to Education and received special mention in the official Cabinet Office press release; the citation for her award recognised her consistent work to improve educational standards in a career spanning over 30 years.

The London Diocesan Board for Schools, used the Trust and the free school initiative to fund a new school. The William Perkin Church of England High School opened in September 2013 with places for 1400 pupils.

Ealing Fields High School was opened by a parent-led group, as a free school in 2016. It merged into the trust in Spring 2017 when it was still in temporary accommodation, in its first year.

At the same time the trust was consulting about its own free school, Ada Lovelace Church of England High School which opened, hosted in the surplus accommodation at William Perkin Church of England High School in September 2018. It moved into its own new building in Ealing in September 2020. It follows the 10/10 Curriculum model that has been developed in the other trust schools.

== Schools ==
=== Secondary schools ===
- Twyford Church of England High School
- William Perkin Church of England High School
- Ealing Fields High School
- Ada Lovelace Church of England High School

== Controversies ==
=== Admissions controversy ===
A member of the public challenged the September 2014 admission procedure which was applied when a trust school was over-subscribed, saying it breached section 88I(5) of the School Standards and Framework Act 1998. The courts concurred. The issue was that the trust wished to reserve places for students whose parents had the strongest connection, firstly to an Anglican church and then to any faith-based place of worship. They had set up a points based system that was not wholly based on evidence of faith, but on willingness to clean the church and attend various hobby-based organisations. In addition the period of commitment was too extensive. The clause inserted for people of no faith meant they would be exempt, leading to differential systems.

== See also ==
- Ark Academy
