= The Parent Agency =

British children's novel

- First edition cover
- Author: David Baddiel
- Illustrator: Jim Field
- Language: English
- Genre: Fantasy, Humour, Adventure
- Publisher: HarperCollins Children's Books
- Publication date: 9 October 2014
- Publication place: United Kingdom
- Pages: 383 pp
- ISBN: 978-0-007-55449-2

The Parent Agency is a children's fiction novel written by David Baddiel and illustrated by Jim Field. It was published on 9 October 2014 by HarperCollins Children's Books. The book follows a 9-year-old boy named Barry Bennett, who gets transported to an alternate universe where children choose their parents. As of 2016, a film adaptation is in the works.

== Synopsis ==
James Bond and FC Barcelona fan Barry Bennett gets transported to 'United Kid-dom' in an alternate universe where kids choose their parents, after Barry wished he had better parents. He encounters his friends Jake, Lucas and Taj (with different names) working at 'The Parent Agency' in 'Youngdon', where he discovers that everyone has to find parents before their tenth birthday. With his in 5 days time, Barry is assigned to 5 different sets of parents (one on each day), before deciding he prefers his original parents, being transported back to them on his tenth birthday.

== Characters ==
- Barry Bennett – the protagonist of the book. He is transported into an alternate universe where kids choose their parents.
- The Sisterly/Secretary Entity (Ginny and Kay Bennett/Bustle) [TSE] – Barry's twin sisters, whom he refers to as one entity. They work at The Parent Agency in the alternate universe, with their (alternate universe) parents being Barry's fifth set of trial parents, where he saves TSE from choking.
- Jake, Lucas and Taj – Barry's friends who work at The Parent Agency in the alternate universe, with Jake 'The Head' of the agency, and Lucas and Taj as PCs (Parent Controllers) 890 and 891.
- Susan and Geoff Bennett – Barry's parents. Barry has a list of 'things [he] blames [his] parents for'.
- Lord and Lady Rader-Wellorff – Barry's first set of trial parents, under the criteria 'rich'. They live at Bottomley Hall in the village of 'Bottomley Bottom' with their butler Peevish and eight children (Jeremy, Teremy, Meremy, Heremy, Queremy, Smellemy, Sea Anemone and Dave). He goes back to The Parent Agency after a grouse shoot.
- Vlad Mitt and Morrissina Padada [Vlassorina] – Barry's second set of trial parents, under the criteria 'famous'. They live in a massive private tower complex called 'Vlassopolis'. They take him to the premiere of Death in the Car 5, at which Vlassorina ask him to change his name to Barrissina, to which he refuses, asking to be taken back to The Parent Agency.
- Derek and Emily Fwahm! – Barry's third set of trial parents, under the criteria 'fit and strong ... never get tired'. They insist on having their surname italicised and with an exclamation mark. They live in a gym, with TVs powered by treadmills. As the fitness trainers on the United Kid-dom football team, they get Barry on the team, where his teammates are the Rader-Wellorff children (due to their father being the head of the FA), along with Lionel Tidy (parody of Lionel Messi).
- Elliott and Mama Cool – Barry's fourth set of trial parents, under the criteria 'parents who let me do whatever I want'. They use 'like' in every sentence. They live in a tent on the Bottomley Hall estate, with their dog, Neil. They ask Barry to go back to The Parents Agency after a game of Animal Car Wars and Barry is sick on them.
- Marjorie and Malcolm Bustle – Barry's fifth set of trial parents, who are also The Secretary Entity's parents in the alternate universe. He saves TSE from choking after putting salt and pepper in his birthday cake from Marjorie and Malcolm and getting TSE to eat it. He goes back to The Parent Agency after feeling bad about this.

== Background ==
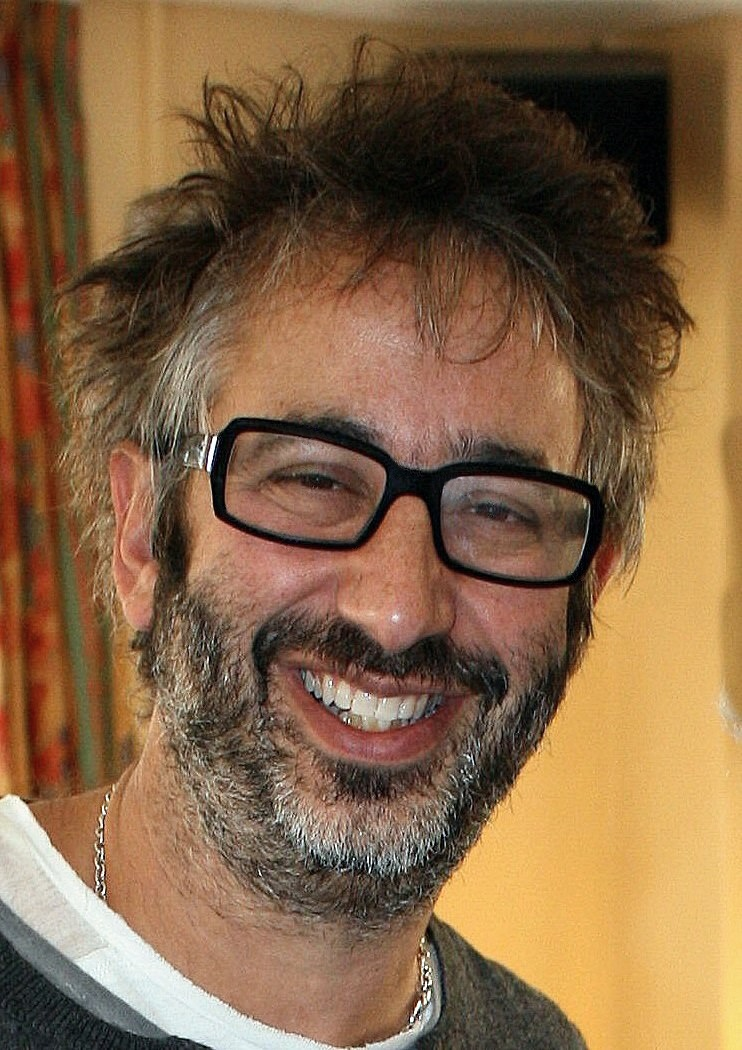
Baddiel in 2010

Baddiel was inspired to write the book after a conversation with his nine-year-old son, Ezra. After visiting a Harry Potter exhibition, Ezra asked his father "Dad, why didn't Harry run away from the Dursleys and go and find some better parents?" This inspired Baddiel to write the book.

== Reception ==
The Parent Agency received positive praise from editorials such as The Guardian and HuffPost UK, while The Independent critiqued it, saying that "[Baddiel] just tries too hard to be funny".

== Adaptation ==
In 2016, Deadline reported that Fox 2000 Pictures had acquired the film rights to The Parent Agency, to be produced by Snowed-In Productions.

A stage musical adaptation premiered at the Storyhouse, Chester with book and lyrics by Baddiel, music and additional lyrics by Dan Gillespie Sells, directed by Tim Jackson, and choreography by Carrie-Anne Ingrouille. The show ran from 15 February (with a gala night on 19 February) until 2 March 2025.

The Parent Agency received positive reviews from Yahoo! News, The Review Hub, and The Times, while The Guardian described the songs as "simplistic, stompy and uninspired".

The cast include:

- Louis Wilkins, Eli Sowden-Mehta, Osian Salter and Max Bispham sharing the role of Barry.
- Rakesh Boury as Geoff.
- Rebecca McKinnis as Susan.
- Alan Vicary as Grandpa.
- Kazmin Borrer as Kay.
- Natasha Cayabyab as Ginny.
- Elliot Broadfoot as Peevish.
- Dylan Collymore as Jacob.
- Sarah McFarlane as Ella.
- Joshian Angelo Omana as DJ.
- Ralph Birtwell and Althea Burey as Ensemble.
- Elliot Copeland, Jessica Daugirda, Sophia Lewis, and Robbie Scott as Swings

== Awards ==
Year	Body	Award	Result
2016	Laugh Out Loud Awards (The Lollies)	Best Laugh Out Loud Book for 9-13 year olds	Won
