= Academic dress of Imperial College London =

Clothing worn by graduates and associates of Imperial College London

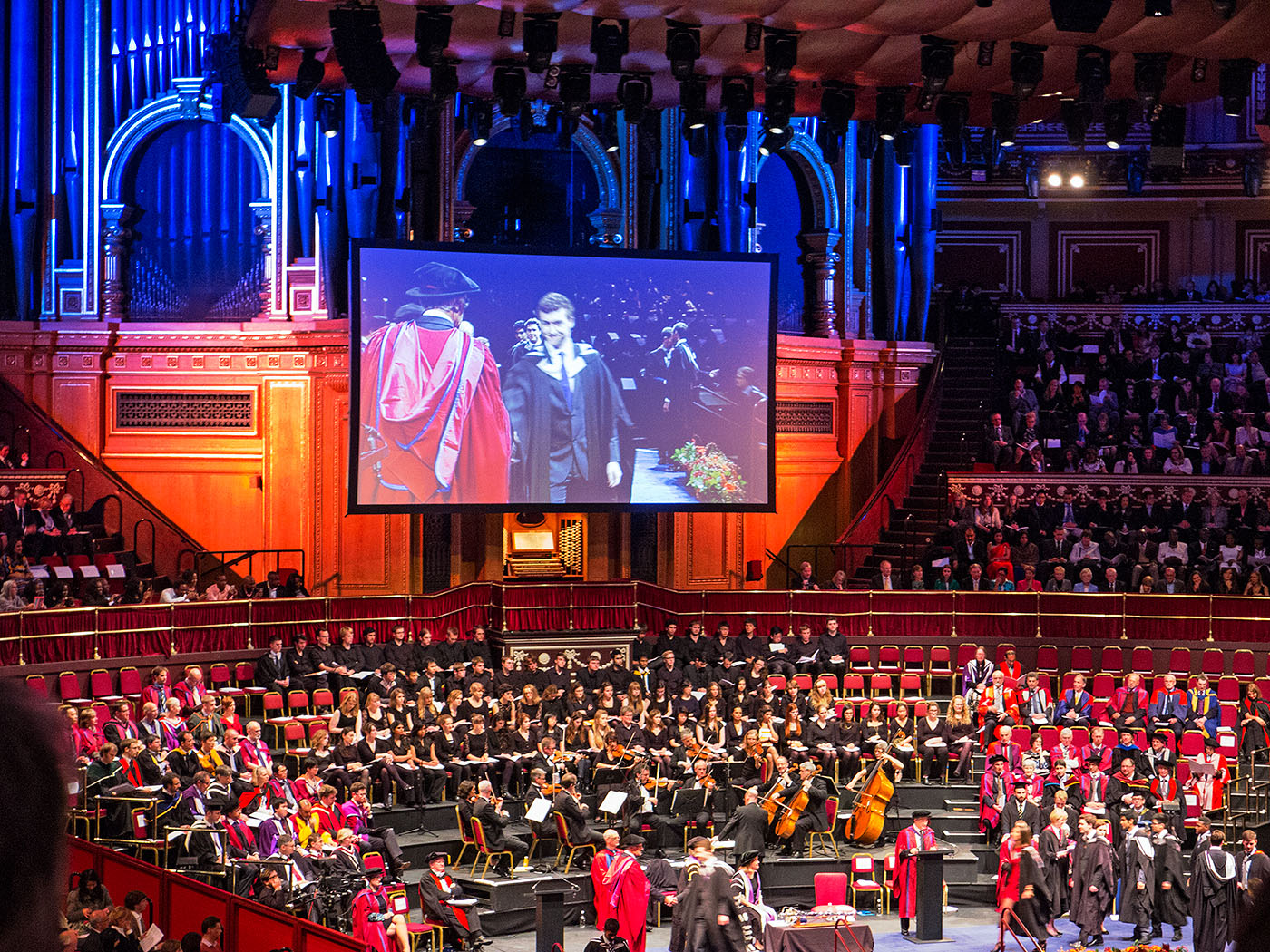
Academic dress worn at Commemoration Day graduation

Graduates and associates of Imperial College London wear its academic dress. After gaining its independence from the University of London in 2007, graduates began wearing Imperial academic dress in 2008. The unifying colour for Imperial's academic dress is purple after the work by William Henry Perkin.

== First degrees ==
All hoods for first degrees are black, part lined with white watered silk, with a narrow purple velvet band. Graduates are distinguished by the colour of the neckband, which denotes the faculty. No hat is worn.

== Postgraduates ==
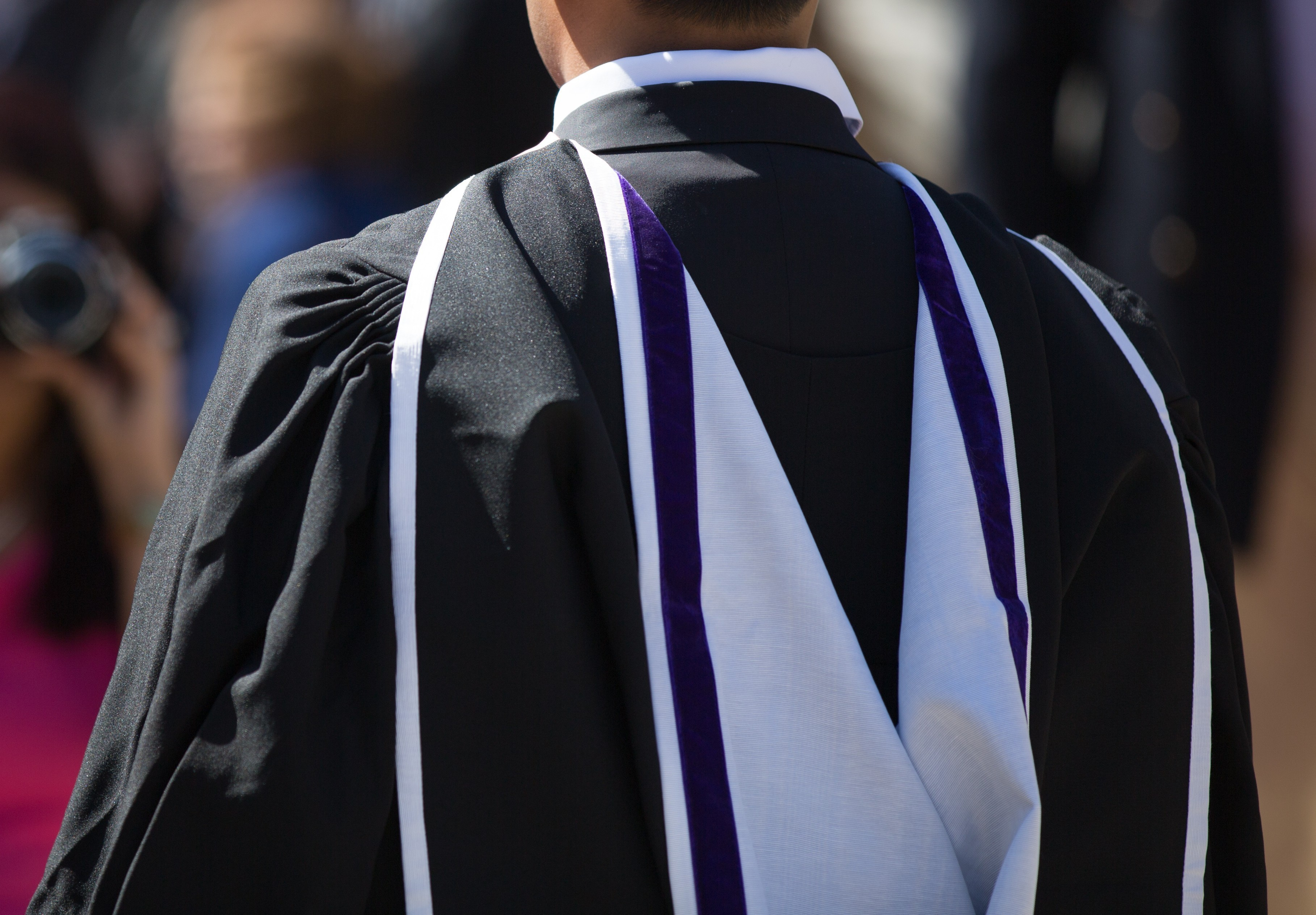
Postgraduate gowns

Postgraduate masters students wear a black hood, fully lined with white watered silk, with a narrow purple velvet band. As with first degree recipients, the faculty is denoted by neckband colour and no hat is worn.

== Colours ==
The neckband colour is associated with the faculty in which the degree was taken, rather than the name of the degree.

Engineering - (BSc (Engineering), BEng, MEng, MSci, MSc and MRes) Silver Grey

Medicine - (MBBS, MSc, MEd, MRes and MPH) Scarlet

Science - (BSc, MSci, MSc, MRes) Saffron

Humanities - (MSc and MRes) Purple, bound white watered silk

Business - (MSc, MBA and MRes) Pink

PG certificate and diploma recipients wear black neckbands. MPhil graduates also wear black neckbands, but wear a hood that is fully lined with purple, with a narrow white band.

== Doctorates ==
Using the Groves classification system, PhD, DEng and MD graduates wear a Cambridge doctors [d1] shape gown of purple cloth, with front facings of white watered silk with a 1" purple velvet ribbon ½" from outside edges of facings. The sleeves are purple and held back with white twisted cords and buttons. The hood is purple, fully lined and bound around the gown with ½" white watered silk, and with a purple velvet ribbon ½" from the cowl edge.

Imperial DSc recipients wear a similar gown but with the sleeves lined with white watered silk and held back with purple twisted cords and buttons.
