= Ricky Sekhon =

English actor

- Born: 15 March 1983 (age 43); Southall, London, England
- Occupation: Actor
- Years active: 2004–present

Ricky S. Sekhon (born 15 March 1983) is an English actor.

== Early life ==
Sekhon was born in Southall, London, the son of Punjabi jat parents. He has two older sisters. He graduated from the Royal Holloway, University of London in 2004 with a Bachelor of Arts in Drama and Theatre Studies.

== Career ==
Sekhon started as an acting member of the National Youth Theatre from 2001 to 2005. He played Osama bin Laden in the 2012 film Zero Dark Thirty.

Sekhon appeared as Hazeem in the 2010 comedy film The Infidel. He has been a part of the National Youth Theatre's outreach programme for many years, taking drama to urban youth centres, directing short films, and shooting a film entitled The Induction with inmates at Feltham Young Offenders Institute. He has worked on directors' courses and short films at the London Film School in Covent Garden, and had his work displayed at the National Gallery.

His most recent role is in the second series of the BBC acclaimed drama The Missing.

== Personal life ==
Apart from English, Sekhon speaks French, Spanish, and Punjabi.

== Filmography ==
=== Film ===
- Watch Over Me: Part 2 – Taxi Driver (2004)
- Lucky Heather – Junkie (2006)
- All the Children Are Sleeping – Lead Assailant (2006)
- Greasy Spoon – Balif (2007)
- Immigration Education – Hassim (2007)
- The Infidel – Hazeem (2010)
- The Last Call – Julian (2010)
- Zero Dark Thirty – Osama bin Laden (2012)
- Double Date (2017)

=== Television ===
- My True Life Shocker – 2008
- The Missing Series 2 – Yardil Askari (2016)
