= Twyford Church of England High School =

Twyford C of E High School

Location
- Twyford Crescent; London, W3 9PP; England; 51.5092°N 0.2788°W

Information
- Type: Academy
- Motto: "I have come that you should have life, and have it to the full" (John 10:10)
- Religious affiliation: Church of England
- Established: 1981
- Department for Education URN: 137546 Tables
- Ofsted: Reports
- Associate Headteacher: Phil Bennett
- Chaplain: The Revd George Meyrick
- Gender: Coeducational
- Age: 11 to 18
- Enrolment: 1600
- Website: www.twyford.ealing.sch.uk

Twyford C of E High School is a co-educational Church of England Academy school located in Acton, west London. It consists of just under 1600 pupils aged 11–18 (with over 600 students in the Sixth Form) and has specialisms in music, science and languages. On 1 October 2011, the school converted to academy status and is now operated by the Twyford Church of England Academies Trust. It has been rated as "outstanding" by the Schools Inspection Agency, Ofsted, and as one of the best state secondary schools in London according to The Sunday Times.

The name "Twyford" comes from the Twyford Brook that runs underground near the Elms, and literally means "Two Fords". This same brook is connected to Twyford Abbey in the West Twyford area of Ealing.

Twyford High School was purchased from the London Borough of Ealing by the London Diocesan Board for Schools and established in 1981 and is one of a family of 13 LDBS secondary schools within the city. The school opened as the result of a concerted campaign by local parents.

One of the school buildings, The Elms, is the oldest surviving building in Acton. It was built by Charles Morren in 1735 as a Baroque country villa and has been occupied by various wealthy citizens. In 1954 it ceased to be a private home. There were plans to demolish it but the former local council, Middlesex County Council, opposed it and bought the house to be used as a school. An extension was added to house new classrooms. In 1981 it was taken over by the new Twyford C of E High School.

On 1 October 2011, the school converted to academy status, meaning that it is independent of local authority control, and directly funded by the Dept of Education. The school is administered by the Twyford Church of England Academies Trust.

== School structure ==
Twyford is organised into year groups each containing seven tutor groups, which are also members of the school's seven houses: Truro, Wells, York, Fountains, Ripon, Durham and Canterbury. Each tutor group has its own Form Representative as well as Chaplaincy, Sports, Enterprise, Music, STEM, Literature and MFL representatives. Additionally, two representatives for each subject are chosen to be the Year Representatives for that subject.

=== House system ===
Each pupil is a member of one of the seven schools houses at Twyford. House representatives meet at a council to represent the views of students in each house and year.

Houses are named after famous cathedrals or abbeys in England or Cornwall and each is associated with a colour.

House	Colour
Truro	Red
Wells	Orange
York	Yellow
Fountains	Light Green
Ripon	Blue
Durham	Dark Blue
Canterbury	Purple

The initials of each House join to create the full name of the school (TWYFORD CE HIGH SCHOOL), with 'O' being excluded for historical reasons.

== Notable former pupils ==
- Ed Harris, playwright
- Simon Reeve (1974–), British documentarian and journalist
- Asma al-Assad (1975–), the wife of the deposed Syrian President Bashar al-Assad and former First lady of Syria
- Lashana Lynch (1987–), actress
- Harry Baker (1992–), poet and comedian
- Myles Hippolyte (1994–), footballer
- Harry Podmore (1994–), cricketer
- Michael Klass (1999–), footballer

== Gallery ==
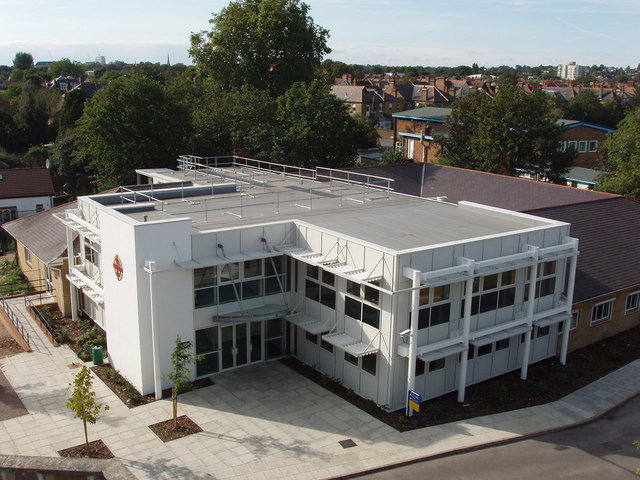

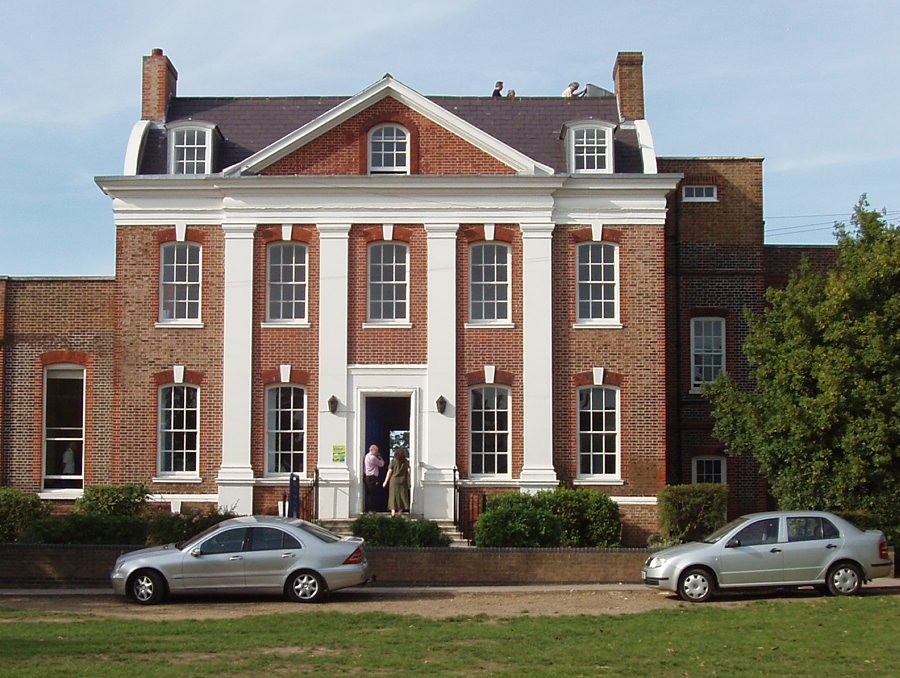

== See also ==
- William Perkin Church of England High School
- Twyford Church of England Academies Trust
