= Time for Bed (Baddiel novel) =

1996 novel by David Baddiel

- First edition (publ. Little, Brown)
- Author: David Baddiel
- Language: English
- Publisher: Little, Brown
- Publication date: 1996

Time for Bed is a 1996 novel by David Baddiel (ISBN 978-0751519785).

== Plot summary ==
Gabriel Jacoby, young, unemployed, sleepless and untidy, lives in Kilburn with his flatmate Nick. Gabe's life is blighted by two problems, his insomnia and his passion for Alice, the beautiful black wife of his brother Ben. The cast of comic characters includes Nick, his girlfriend Fran, a cat Jezebel, Ben and Gabe's parents and grandmother Mutti, who lives in a Jewish old age-home, Liv Dashem House. Gabe's mother spends her life talking about and collecting memorabilia of the LZ 129 Hindenburg, an airship designed by her own father, while their father spends his life swearing loudly at his wife at their home at 22 Salmon Street, Wembley Park.

When Dina arrives from the States to visit her sister Alice, Gabe decides to ask her out. They go to see Queens Park Rangers play at home, but the old car breaks down on the way. Finding Alice's Green Flag card in her pocket, Dina agrees to pretend to be her sister to get help, but Gabe does not have sufficient funds to get the car repaired. In spite of the disastrous afternoon, he manages to persuade Dina to come round for dinner. Unfortunately, when he lifts the lid off his tandoori Quorn, a live frog which had been brought home by Jezebel jumps out. Dina is horrified but eventually falls into Gabe's arms. The first time they make love, Gabe disposes of the condom by filling it with water and tying the top, and notices a leak. Later in the novel Dina discovers she is pregnant, and decides to return to the US for an abortion. In the last scene Gabe is on a plane to find her.

The novel is enlivened by the escapades of the other characters. Nick becomes disturbed under the influence of cannabis but the drugs prescribed reduce him to a sleepy weight: Fran has an affair with Ben, who is drawn to Jewish life and has discovered that Fran is Jewish. Their mother eventually destroys the Hindenburg, the real one having crashed anyway. Jezebel brings home a dead rat, and Gabe spends a happy night playing with it, and then puts it away in a drawer and forgets it. Nick tells Alice that Gabe has been in love with him all along.
