= Woodfield School =

Location
- Glenwood Avenue; Kingsbury; London, NW9 7LY; England; 51.5719°N 0.2540°W

Information
- Type: Special School; Academy
- Established: 1959
- Local authority: Brent
- Department for Education URN: 140796 Tables
- Ofsted: Reports
- Head Teacher: N. Cooper
- Gender: Coeducational
- Age: 11 to 19
- Website: http://www.woodfield.brent.sch.uk/

Woodfield School, located in Kingsbury, London, caters for pupils aged 11–19 with a range of special educational needs including those who have moderate to complex learning difficulties together with a range of other needs. Two thirds of the pupils are boys. Increasingly, pupils are admitted with more complex needs. A further quarter have behaviour, emotional and social difficulties (BESD). Nearly half have English as an additional language (EAL), with Gujarati, Urdu and Somali being the three main languages spoken other than English. Nearly half the pupils are entitled to free school meals, and the number coming from single parent families is high.

The school is a member of a local Education Action Zone (EAZ) and has achieved the Investors in People, Healthy Schools, Sportsmark, and International School awards. In July 2009, the school was granted specialist sports college school status in sport.

A new sixth form building opened in February 2008. The sixth form is for pupils aged from 16 to 19, and consists of a year 12, year 13 and year 14 class.

In September 2010, the school opened an SLD unit to provide placements for pupils entering year 7 that would allow them a staged transition to the main part of the school.

In March 2013, the school was accepted as a Teaching School, part of the National Teaching School program run by the Department for Education. Woodfield is part of an alliance of strategic partners in Brent Schools. The school helps to provide Teacher Training. The alliance will has a focus on SEN and also supports schools in the Brent Schools Partnership. The other partners are Oakington Manor Primary School, The Village and Manor School.

On 1 March 2019 Woodfield became part of the Compass Learning Partnership, a multi academy trust of schools in Brent.
