= Brondesbury College =

Brondesbury College for Boys

Location
- 8 Brondesbury Park; Brent, London, NW6 7BT; England; 51.5424°N 0.2127°W

Information
- Type: Independent Secondary
- Motto: Skills for Life
- Religious affiliation: Sunni Islam
- Established: 1996
- Founder: Yusuf Islam
- Department for Education URN: 131059 Tables
- Ofsted: Reports
- Head Master: Amzad Ali
- Gender: Boys
- Age: 11 to 16
- Enrolment: 125
- Website: www.brondesburycollege.co.uk

Brondesbury College for Boys (BCB) is a selective independent school for boys situated in Brent, London, England. It was founded by Yusuf Islam in 1996, as part of the Waqf Al-Birr Educational Trust, to provide an education institution for young Muslim students in the United Kingdom. Brondesbury College performs well in Brent and also nationally with an 83% 5+ A*–C pass rate in GCSE in 2014. BCB's current head master is Amzad Ali, who succeeded Salahuddin Clifton.

A 2012 Ofsted inspection awarded Brondesbury College as 'Good' in all inspected aspects. The inspection stated that "The English curriculum is a particular strength of the school but the focus of Quranic lessons is not always clear." Brondesbury College caters to years 7 to 11, and primary school education is provided for at the government-funded Islamia Primary School.

The 2018 Ofsted inspection described Brondesbury College as "Outstanding" in all aspects, and that "Leaders and trustees are highly ambitious for pupils and are determined that the school continues to improve. The students learn amazing values at this school. They ensure that all of the independent school standards are met".
