= Islamia Primary School =

Islamic primary school in London, England, United Kingdom

Location
- 129 Salusbury Road; Queen's Park, London, NW6 6PE; England; 51.5395°N 0.2082°W

Information
- Type: Voluntary aided school
- Religious affiliation: Islam
- Established: October 1983
- Founder: Yusuf Islam
- Local authority: Brent
- Department for Education URN: 101574 Tables
- Ofsted: Reports
- Chairman: Sofia Moussaui
- Head teacher: Shiraz Khan
- Gender: Coeducational
- Age: 4 to 11
- Website: https://islamia.brent.sch.uk

Islamia Primary School is a voluntary aided primary, Islamic faith school in Queen's Park, London, England. It is located in the London Borough of Brent.

== History ==
Islamia Primary School was founded in October 1983 by Yusuf Islam, the singer/songwriter who was known as Cat Stevens until his conversion to Islam in 1978. In 1998, the school was the first Muslim school in Britain to be granted public funding by the Government. This funding was secured after a campaign of thirteen years and several rejections of their applications for voluntary state aid.

Prince Charles visited to officially inaugurate the school's voluntary aided status on 10 May 2000. He praised their approach of providing both secular and religious education.

The school applied, in September 2010, for permission to construct an £8 million extension including a new two-storey building. It would be funded jointly by Brent Council, the school and the government. The scheme, designed by Marks Barfield, was granted planning permission in December 2010 but has proved controversial with residents groups threatening to take legal action to stop it. Brent Council announced, in November 2013, that the development had been included in Phase 3 of their Permanent Primary School Expansion project.

== Academic education ==
The school is two form entry with approximately 420 pupils aged between the ages of 4 and 11. The school was intended to have 10% non-Muslim pupils. It has 210 official places and 3,500 pupils on the waiting list. Islamia follows the national curriculum supplemented with classes on religion and studies of the Arabic language.

The Ofsted inspection on 2013 rated the school as "Good", point 2 on a four-point scale. Ofsted reported positively on the school community, and the way that the children were engaged in their learning. In 2022 the Ofsted inspection marked the school as "Inadequate."

In 2013, the school won the Global Peace and Unity Education Award for Excellence, for UK primary schools.

== Linked schools ==
The Islamia Branch consists of three schools; the primary school, Islamia Girls High School, and the boys' school, Brondesbury College.
