= William Perkin Church of England High School =

Location
- Oldfield Lane North; Greenford; London, UB6 8PR; England; 51.5374°N 0.3498°W

Information
- Type: Free School
- Religious affiliation: Church of England
- Established: 2013
- Trust: Twyford Church of England Academies Trust
- Department for Education URN: 139725 Tables
- Ofsted: Reports
- Headteacher: Amy Newman
- Gender: Coeducational
- Age: 11 to 18
- Website: http://www.williamperkin.org.uk/

William Perkin Church of England High School is a coeducational secondary school and sixth form located in the Greenford area of London, England.

== History ==
The school was established in 2013. It is a free school sponsored by the Twyford Church of England Academies Trust. The school is named for scientist Sir William Perkin, a pioneer of the chemical industry and discoverer of the dye mauveine, whose factory was nearby. The school has a mauve school uniform as a tribute to him.

In July 2017, a 13-year-old student who attended the school, Karanbir Cheema, died after having a severe allergic reaction at his school in West London on 28 June 2017. Cheema was severely allergic to wheat, gluten, all dairy products, eggs and all nuts. The Metropolitan Police Service arrested an unnamed 13-year-old student who also attended the school on suspicion of attempted murder. Reportedly, the unnamed student had thrown a piece of cheese at Cheema. However, all charges against the unnamed student were eventually dropped. A Coroner's inquest into the circumstances surrounding the death of Cheema ruled that the main factor in his death was his severe allergy. The ruling also called for schools to better educate pupils to the dangers of allergies and for care plans for children with allergies to be 'beefed up'.

In September 2018, the school hosted students of Ada Lovelace Church of England High School, another Twyford Academies Trust member, for two cohorts, and who have now been relocated to a new school site.
