= Ark Academy =

Location
- Wembley; London; England; 51.56497°N 0.27882°W

Information
- Type: Academy
- Established: 30 September 2008
- Local authority: Brent
- Department for Education URN: 135600 Tables
- Ofsted: Reports
- Principal: Delia Smith
- Headteacher: James Elliott
- Gender: Mixed
- Age: 3 to 18
- Website: http://arkacademy.org

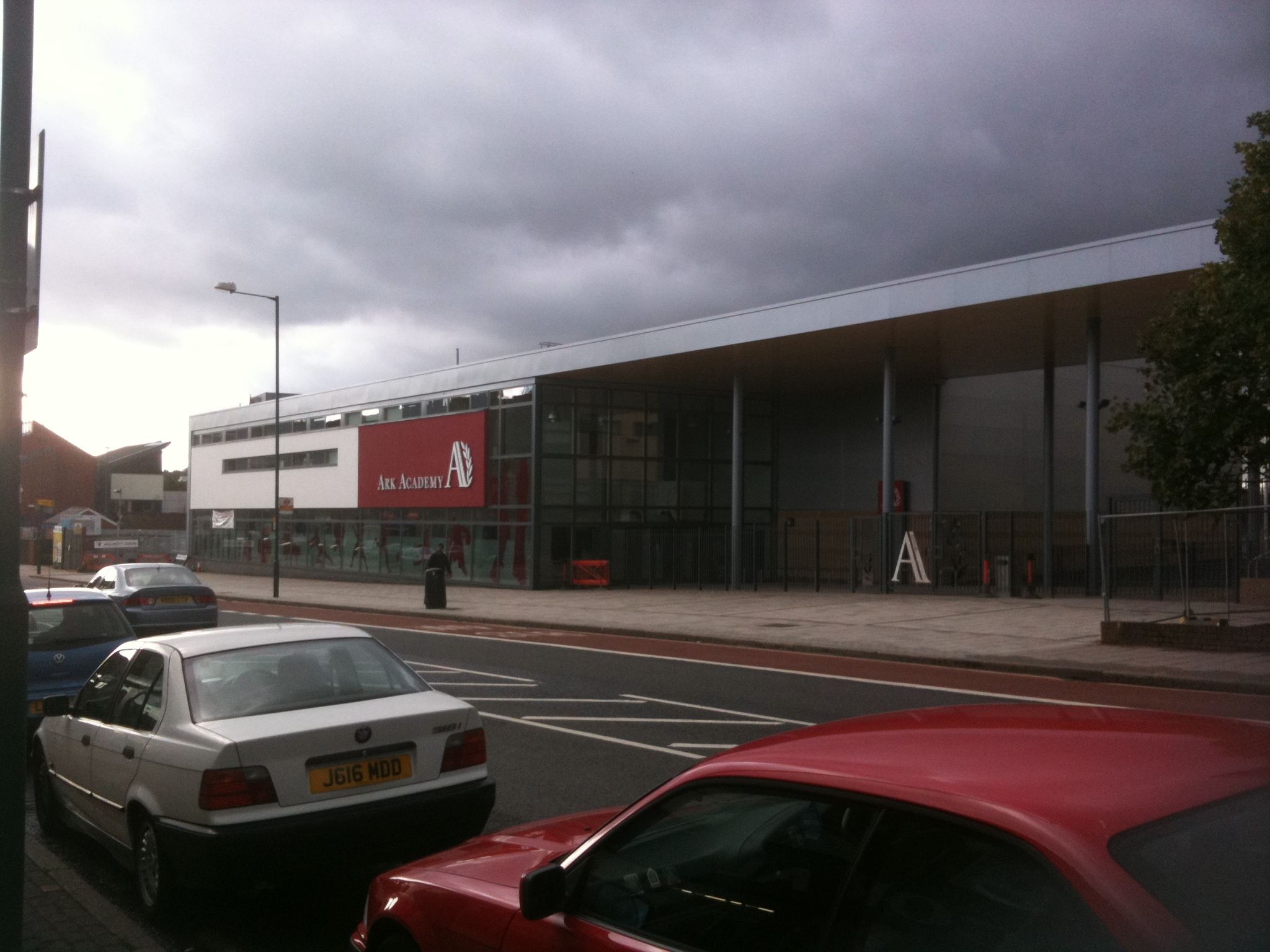
Ark Academy, Wembley

Ark Academy is a mixed all-through school located in Wembley, London, in the London Borough of Brent, England.

The school was established in 2010 by Ark, one of the first new schools to be established under the academies programme. Ark Academy offers primary, secondary and sixth form education to pupils aged 3 to 18. The primary phase of the school is located on Forty Avenue, while the secondary phase is located on Bridge Road. The schools most recent addition of its sixth form building was opened in early 2016 on Forty Avenue.

In February 2016 Ark Academy was named as one of the top 100 non-selective state schools in England.
