= Loop line =

Loop line could refer to:

== Uses in communications and circuits ==
- Loop around, telephone company test circuit
- Loopback, electrical or datacomm loop

== Uses in transportation ==
- Loop line (railway)
- Loop Line, Chongqing Rail Transit, Chongqing, China

== See also ==
- Circle Line (disambiguation)
