= North and West London Light Railway =

Proposed railway in London, England

- Location: London, UK
- Proposer: Campaign for Better Transport
- Project website: Brent Cross campaign page at the Wayback Machine (archived 30 September 2009)
- Status: Proposal
- Type: Light rail
- Stakeholders: Campaign for Better Transport and Barnet, Brent, Harrow, Ealing councils

The North and West London Light Railway (NWLLR), formerly known as the Brent Cross Railway, is a proposal for a light rail system in North and West London in the UK. It was put forward by the London group of the Campaign for Better Transport and by the Coalition for a Sustainable Brent Cross Cricklewood.

The proposal, published in 2008, envisaged a rapid transit network using existing or abandoned railway corridors and would have been similar to the Docklands Light Railway (DLR). It was promoted in the context of the Brent Cross Shopping Centre expansion project, a major urban planning scheme that involves the redevelopment of Brent Cross and northern Cricklewood. The stated aim was to alleviate anticipated traffic problems when this development goes ahead.

The NWLLR has not been approved or funded.

== Overview ==
The Campaign for Better Transport aimed to reduce CO_{2} emissions, pollution and cars on the roads. It has said that high-intensity bus services in Brent Cross create more pollution and traffic jams.

=== Route ===
The route would have had 34 stations on four lines:

- Ealing Broadway - Hanger Lane South - West Acton - Alliance Road - North Acton - Harlesden - Craven Park - Taylors Lane - Neasden - Dudden Hill - Gladstone Park - Edgware Road Brent - Brent Cross West - Brent Cross Shopping Centre - Brent Cross South - Brent Cross
- Park Royal - Park Royal Central - North Acton - Harlesden - Craven Park - Taylors Lane - Neasden - Brent Park - Tokyngton - Wembley Stadium
- Wembley Stadium - Tokyngton - Brent Park - Neasden - Dudding Hill - Gladstone Park - Edgware Road Brent - Brent Cross West - Brent Cross Shopping Centre - Brent Cross South - Brent Cross
- Finchley Road - West Hampstead - Mill Lane - Cricklewood - Brent Cross West - Brent Cross Shopping Centre - Brent Cross West - Hendon - Kingsbury Road - Colindeep Lane - Colindale - Grahame Park Way - Copthall - Mill Hill East - Finchley Central

== Core proposal ==
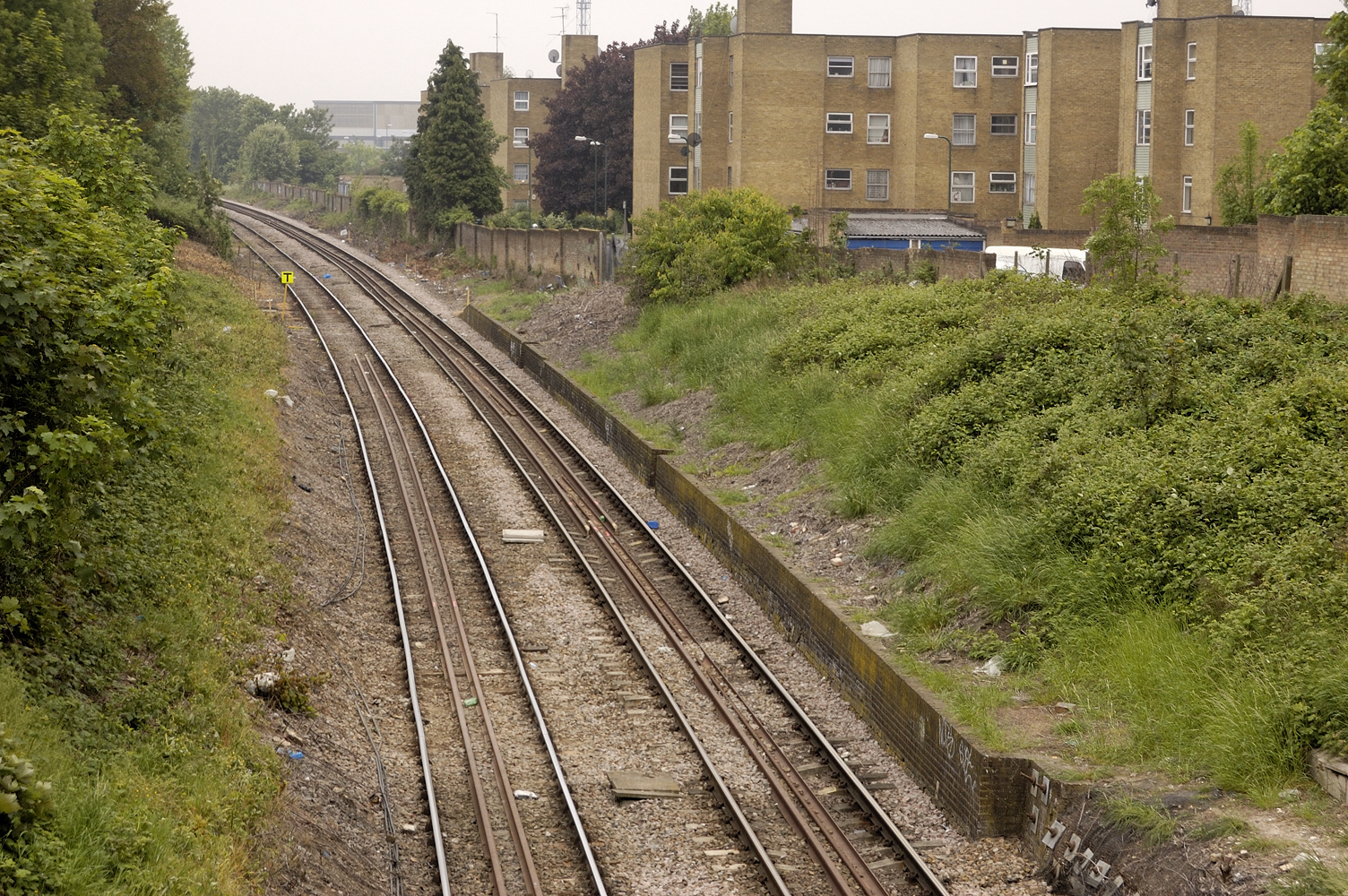
The freight-only Dudding Hill line, which features in the proposal

The proposal suggested that the service could be light rail, similar to the Docklands Light Railway. The core proposal envisaged a line running east–west across north London from Brent Cross to Park Royal, with extensions to Ealing Broadway and Wembley Stadium, and a new line running north–south from Finchley Central through Brent Cross to Finchley Road.

The routes would have used a combination of existing passenger railway lines, freight lines and disused lines, linked by stretches of new track. The network was to include the Dudding Hill Line, the Ealing Broadway branch of the Central line and freight tracks parallel to the Midland Main Line.

== Political views ==
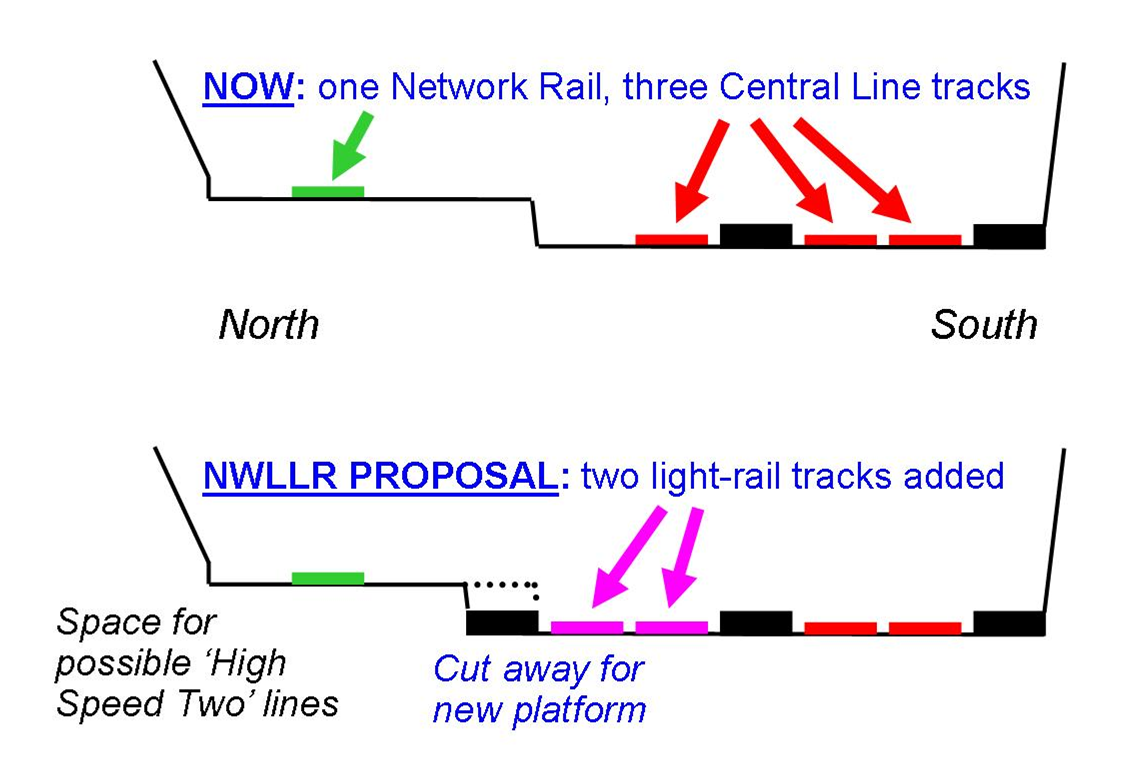
The current and NWLLR-proposed rail track at North Acton

The proposal had limited support from some local councils, but lacked the funding or support from the Greater London Authority that is necessary to undertake project costings or a feasibility study. The proposal was not supported by the site developers at Brent Cross and relied on changes being made to their plans.

In April 2009, Ealing Council voted to call on Transport for London to look into the proposal and discuss its strategic potential with neighbouring councils. Harrow Council gave its support in principle, but stating that unless Transport for London provided "funding for a feasibility study to examine this proposal ... no more public money should be directed towards this proposal." In 2009 Brian Coleman, the mayor of Barnet and London Assembly Member for Barnet and Camden, said "It's not feasible, it won't happen. Ideas like this are thought up by men who probably still have a train set in the attic." Later that year, Barnet Council voted to request the developers to maintain contact with the light rail promoters. In January 2011, Brent Council voted to call on Transport for London to look into the proposal and discuss its strategic potential with neighbouring councils. In January 2014, Barnet Council voted that "much-needed orbital rail links should be investigated, routes safeguarded and included in financial planning", but it removed a reference in the original motion to "light-rail".

In April 2019, £320M of funding was approved for a new Brent Cross West station, that would also serve the potential new service.

== Other proposals ==
A similar proposal was put forward by West London Business in 2008 to build a Surbiton-to-Brent Cross underground railway, called the West London Orbital. In 2009, the London Assembly proposed using the Dudding Hill Line section of the route for a new London Overground service. From 2016 a different scheme of the same name was developed by the West London Alliance boroughs, TfL and the GLA. This scheme features in the 2018 Mayor's Transport Strategy.
