= R25 =

R25 may refer to:

== Automobiles ==
- BMW R25, a German motorcycle
- Renault 25, a French executive car
- Renault R25, a Formula One car
- Yamaha YZF-R25, a Japanese motorcycle

== Aviation ==
- British Airship R25, a training airship
- Rubik R-25 Mokány, a Hungarian glider
- Tumansky R-25, a Soviet turbojet engine

== Roads ==
- R-25 regional road (Montenegro)
- R25 (South Africa)

== Other uses ==
- R25 (London), a proposed railway orbital in Greater London
- R25: Toxic if swallowed, a risk phrase
- R-25 Vulkan, a Yugoslav surface-to-air missile
- HMS Carysfort (R25), a destroyer of the Royal Navy
- Remington Model R-25, a semi-automatic rifle
- USS R-25 (SS-102), a submarine of the United States Navy
