= Ealing Broadway station =

London Underground and railway station

Ealing Broadway
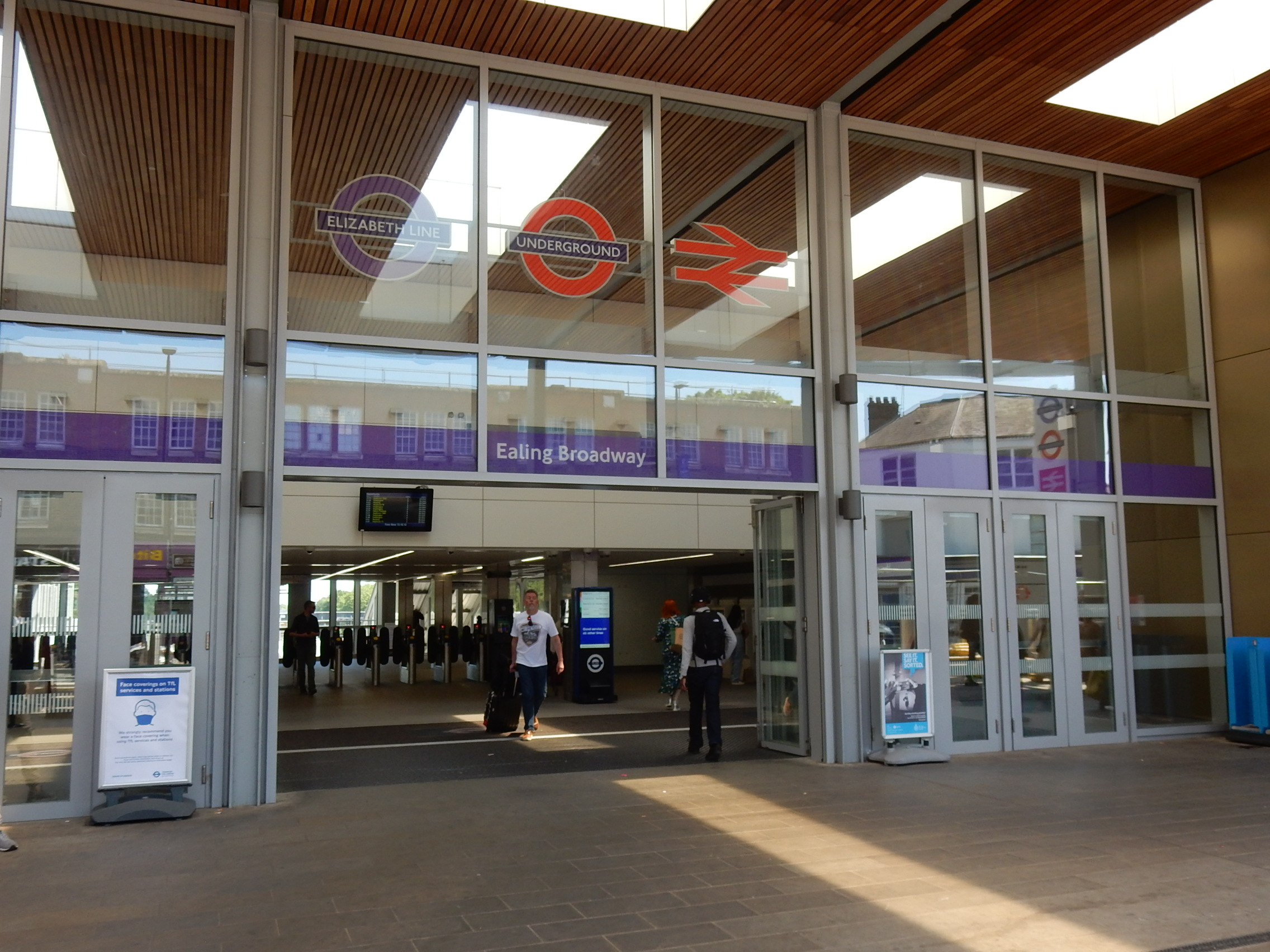
- Station entrance seen in May 2022
- Interactive map of Ealing Broadway

General information
- Location: Ealing
- Local authority: London Borough of Ealing
- Managed by: Elizabeth line
- Owner: Transport for London; Network Rail
- Station code: EAL
- DfT category: C1
- Number of platforms: 9
- Fare zone: 3

London Underground annual entry and exit
- 2020: ▼7.72 million
- 2021: ▼6.93 million
- 2022: ▲13.43 million
- 2023: ▲15.43 million
- 2024: ▲17.08 million

National Rail annual entry and exit
- 2020–21: ▼2.066 million
- Interchange: ▼7,409
- 2021–22: ▲4.769 million
- Interchange: ▲17,992
- 2022–23: ▲8.237 million
- Interchange: ▲74,728
- 2023–24: ▲13.700 million
- Interchange: ▲0.162 million
- 2024–25: ▲15.457 million
- Interchange: ▼85,703

Railway companies
- Original company: Great Western Railway
- Pre-grouping: Great Western Railway
- Post-grouping: Great Western Railway

Key dates
- December 1838: Opened (GWR)
- 1 July 1879: Opened (DR)
- 3 August 1920: Start (CLR)
- 20 May 2018: Start (TfL Rail)

Other information
- External links: TfL station info page; Departures; Facilities
- Coordinates: 51.5147°N 0.3017°W

Ealing Broadway is a major single-level interchange station located in Ealing, in the London Borough of Ealing, West London for London Underground services and Elizabeth line services on the National Rail Great Western Main Line.

On the London Underground, it is one of three western termini of the District line, the preceding station being Ealing Common, and it is also one of two western termini of the Central line, the preceding station being West Acton. On the National Rail network, it is a through-station on the Great Western Main Line, 5 miles 56 chains (9.2 km) down the line from London Paddington, between Acton Main Line and West Ealing.

The station is managed by the Elizabeth line and saw a major upgrade and expansion as part of the Crossrail project, with a rebuilt ticket hall and the provision of step-free access.

== History ==
The Great Western Railway (GWR) opened its pioneering broad gauge tracks through Ealing Broadway between Paddington and Taplow on 4th June 1838, although Ealing Broadway station did not open until December of that year. As the only station in the area when it opened, it was initially named 'Ealing', but was renamed Ealing Broadway in 1875.

District Railway (DR, now the District Line) services commenced on 1 July 1879, when the DR opened a branch from Turnham Green on its Richmond line. The DR built its own three-platform station (including a siding) to the north of the GWR one. However, following the installation of a connection between the two railways to the east of the stations, DR trains also served the GWR station from 1 March 1883 to 30 September 1885, on a short-lived service running to Windsor and Eton Central station, which quickly became unprofitable. It was also intended to use the connection for a service to Uxbridge Vine Street station (via West Drayton), but this was never introduced.

Following electrification of the main District line route through Ealing Common to South Harrow in 1903, the section to Ealing Broadway was electrified in 1905, and the first electric trains ran to Ealing Broadway on 1 July 1905. The original brick-built DR station was replaced with a stone-faced building in 1910.

Prior to World War I, plans were made by the GWR to construct a new, mainly freight, line between Ealing and Shepherd's Bush, to connect west-to-south with the West London Railway. The Central London Railway (CLR, now the Central Line) would use the line by extending its tracks the short distance north from its terminus at Wood Lane (now closed), to meet the new GWR tracks. CLR services to two new platforms at Ealing Broadway, built between the GWR and DR stations, started on 3 August 1920, with, initially, just one intermediate stop at East Acton. The line also carried GWR steam freight trains until 1938, when the links at Ealing Broadway and west of North Acton were removed, and the line was fully transferred to London Underground.

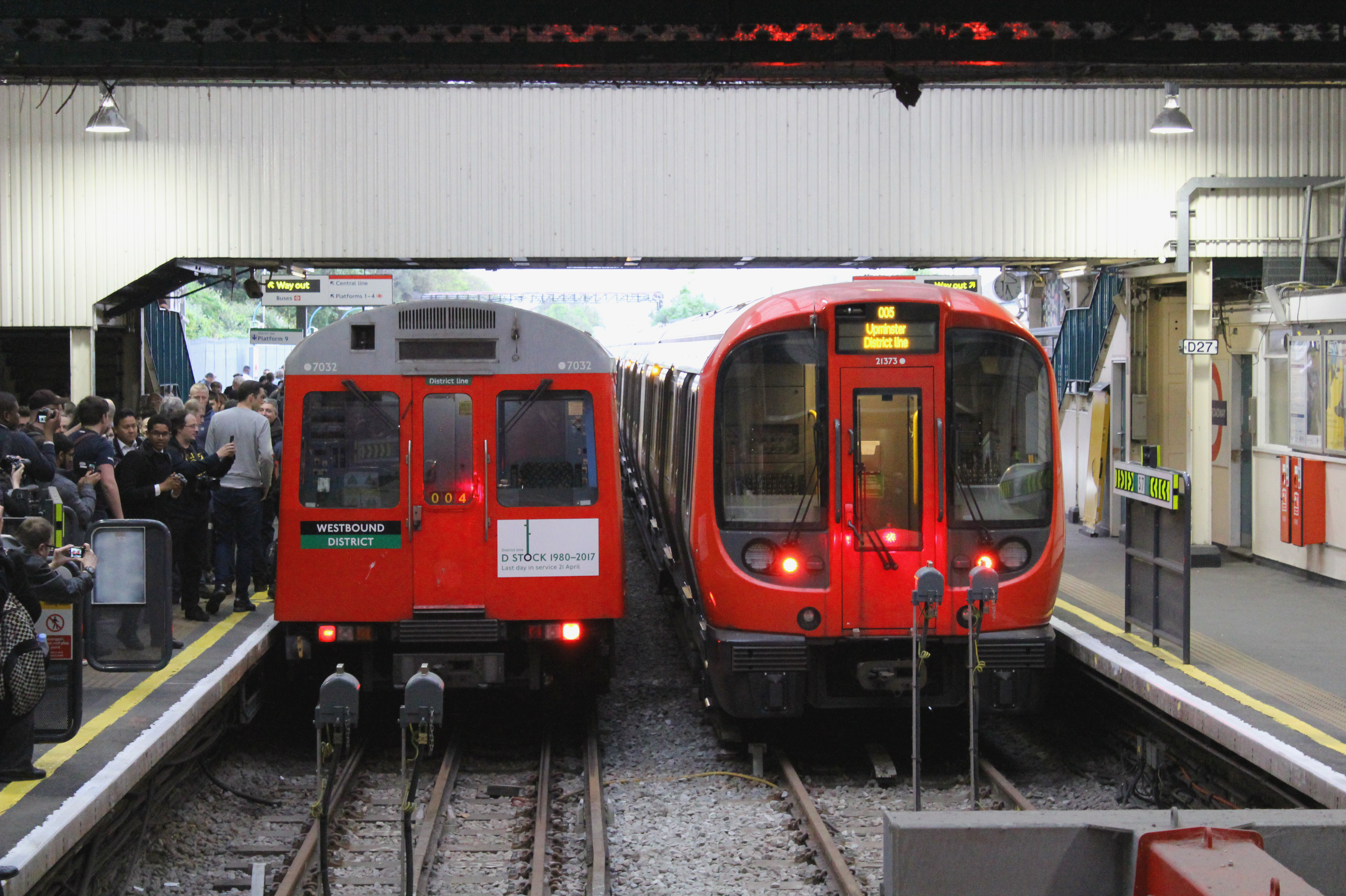
D78 Stock and S7 Stock at Ealing Broadway on the last day of the former's operation, 21 April 2017

Originally separate companies, by 1920 the DR and the CLR were both owned by the Underground Electric Railways Company of London (UERL). Despite this, the CLR services operated via the GWR station building, not the Underground one.

The GWR-built station was demolished in 1961 and replaced by a low concrete structure containing shops and a ticket hall, opened in 1965, with a high-rise office building above. The new station building serves all the lines, and the separate District Line station ticket hall was closed, although the building remains, and the original station facade is now the entrance for multiple shops.

On Platform 9 (District line) there are some roundels of a style dating from c. 1908, three of which are replicas made in 1992.

In the mid 1990s, the Great Western Main Line through the station was electrified as part of the Heathrow Express project.

In the early 1990s, the Crossrail project was proposed to serve Ealing Broadway. After many years of planning, the project was approved in 2007. An interim TfL Rail service between suburban stations and London Paddington began in 2018, transferring to the Elizabeth line on 24 May 2022.

=== Accidents and incidents ===
- On 16 November 1937, a steam railcar overran signals and crashed into the signal box.
- On 19 December 1973, an express passenger train was derailed when an unsecured inspection door on the locomotive hauling it struck point rodding, causing a set of points to move under the train. Ten people were killed, 94 were injured.
- On 19 July 2000, a Real IRA bomb was planted near tracks in the station. It was discovered and destroyed by police under a controlled explosion.
- On 2 March 2016, a District Line train derailed just outside the station due to a set of points set incorrectly. There were no injuries.

== Modern station ==
=== Layout ===
The combined station has nine platforms:

- Two National Rail platforms (1 and 2). These are only used by Great Western Railway (GWR) trains between Didcot Parkway and London Paddington, except during engineering works or a disruption.
- Two Elizabeth line platforms (3 and 4). Platforms 1, 2, 3 and 4 all are mostly in the open, but have small canopies and shelters. These platforms can be used by GWR too.
- Two Central line (5 and 6), which have a shared awning canopy.
- Three District Line (7 to 9). District Line platforms 8 and 9 are partially covered by a short canopy, and retain one original example and a number of replicas of early solid-disc Underground signs, used before Edward Johnston designed the familiar roundel in 1919.

All platforms are accessed through a gateline of ticket barriers.

=== Crossrail upgrades ===
As part of the Crossrail project, the station was upgraded and expanded to meet increased passenger numbers, improve the interchange between various rail and local bus services and provide step free access.

Initially, only minor station improvements were planned as part of the Crossrail project, such as platform lengthening. However, after local and regional campaigning, the station was upgraded and step free access provided. After further criticism by local people of poor design, the station entrance was redesigned with a large glass frontage and a long curved canopy to the street.

Designed by Bennetts Associates, the station upgrade has involved demolishing the old cramped ticket hall and staircases, replacing them with:

- A new double height ticket hall, twice as large as the previous ticket hall.
- Improved and enlarged public realm outside the station with new paving, seating and street trees.
- Step free access from street to platform via new lifts, making the station fully accessible.
- Refurbishment and upgrade of existing platforms, including new signage, waiting rooms and customer information screens.
- Platform extensions to accommodate the longer Class 345 trains used by Crossrail.
- New footbridge at the eastern end of the station linking platforms 1–4.

After several periods of delay, construction on the upgrade began in 2018 by Network Rail. On 27 May 2021, the majority of the new station facilities, including the station building and ticket office, were completed and opened to the public.

=== Proposed developments ===
In the early 2010s, the West London Business group backed a Surbiton-to-Brent Cross light metro tube line, called the West London Orbital underground railway, based on Copenhagen Metro technology, which would include a station underground at Ealing Broadway. The London Borough of Ealing does not support the proposal, saying "no consensus to progress this project [due] to extremely high costs".

In 2008, the London Group of the Campaign for Better Transport published a plan for an off-road orbital North and West London Light railway (NWLLR), sharing the Dudding Hill Line freight corridor, and using the middle two of the six track beds at North Acton. In April 2009, Ealing Council voted to call on Transport for London to look into the proposal.

The station would have been served by the West London Tram, however this proposal was cancelled in 2007 as it was opposed by the councils of all three London Boroughs that would have been served by the line.

== Services ==
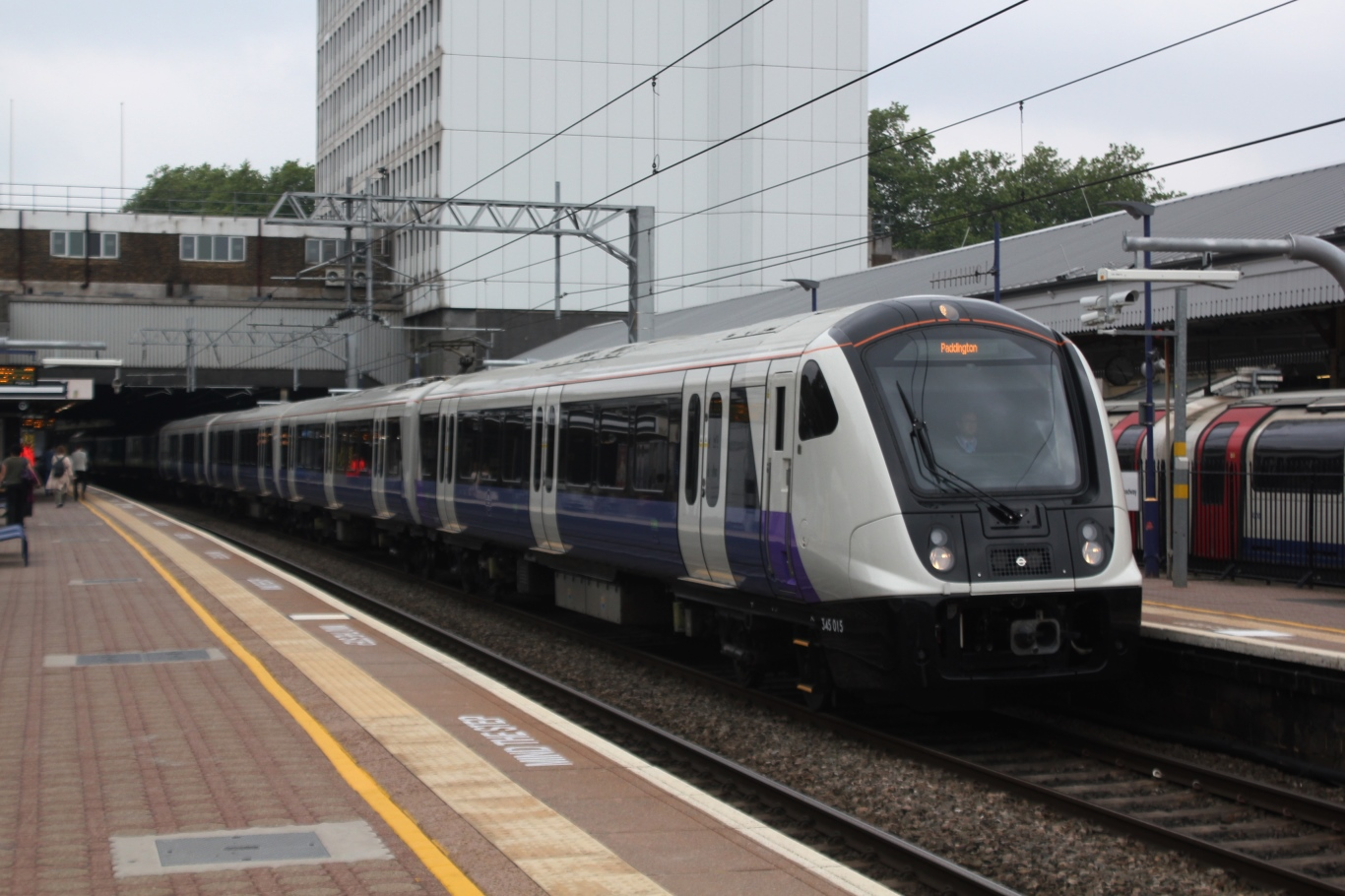
A then-TfL Rail Class 345 at platform 4 with a service to London Paddington; following completion of the Crossrail project, these services would be operated by the Elizabeth line

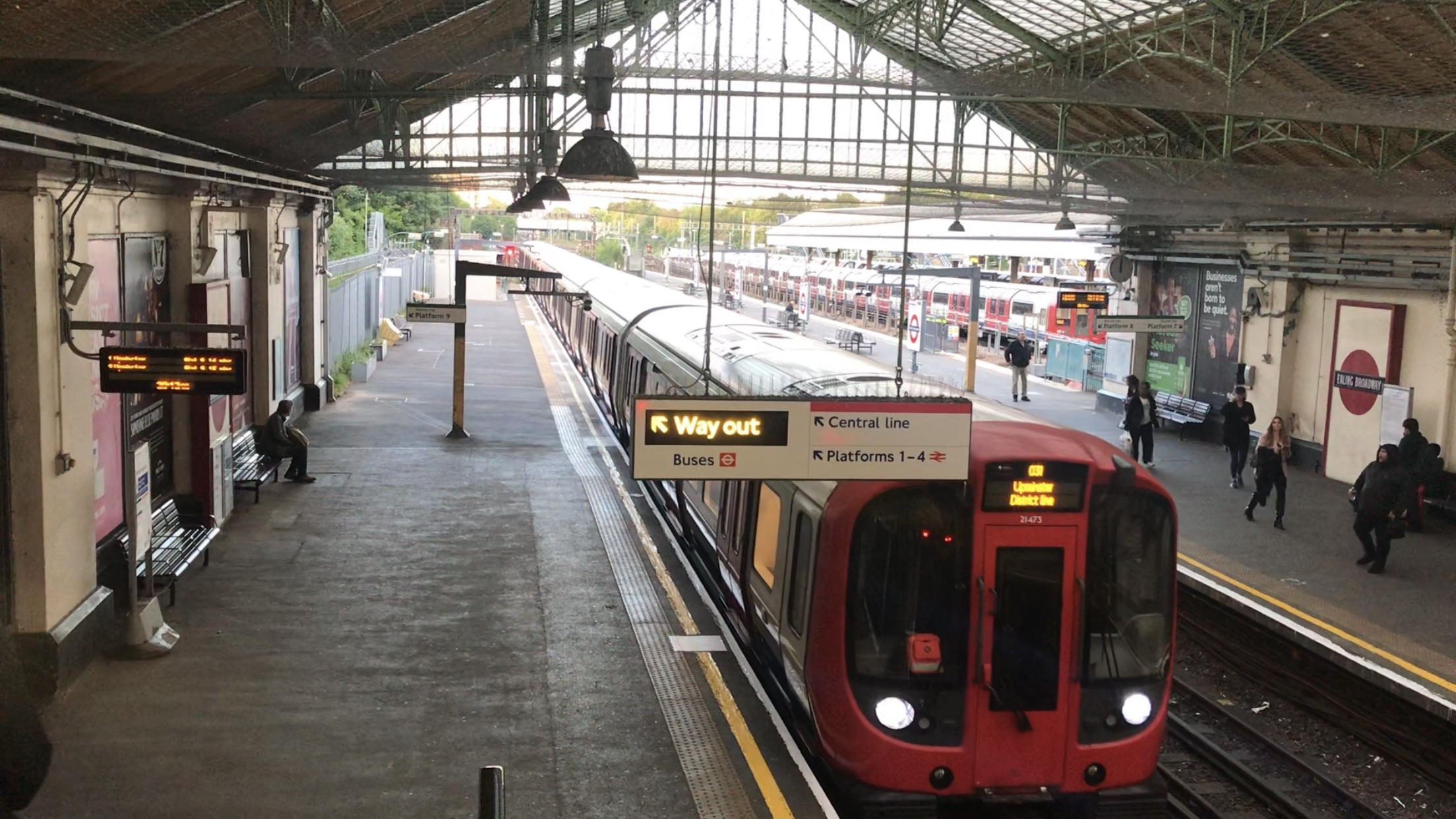
A District line train of S7 Stock at platform 9

Ealing Broadway is served by a mixture of National Rail and London Underground services. National Rail services are operated by the Elizabeth line, and London Underground services by the Central and District lines.

Services at the station are as follows.

=== Elizabeth line ===
As of the May 2023 timetable, the typical Monday to Friday off-peak service is:

- 4 tph (trains per hour) westbound to Heathrow Terminal 4
- 2 tph westbound to Heathrow Terminal 5
- 2 tph westbound to Reading
- 2 tph westbound to Maidenhead
- 2 tph eastbound to Shenfield
- 8 tph eastbound to Abbey Wood

Elizabeth line services are operated using Class 345 EMUs.

=== London Underground ===
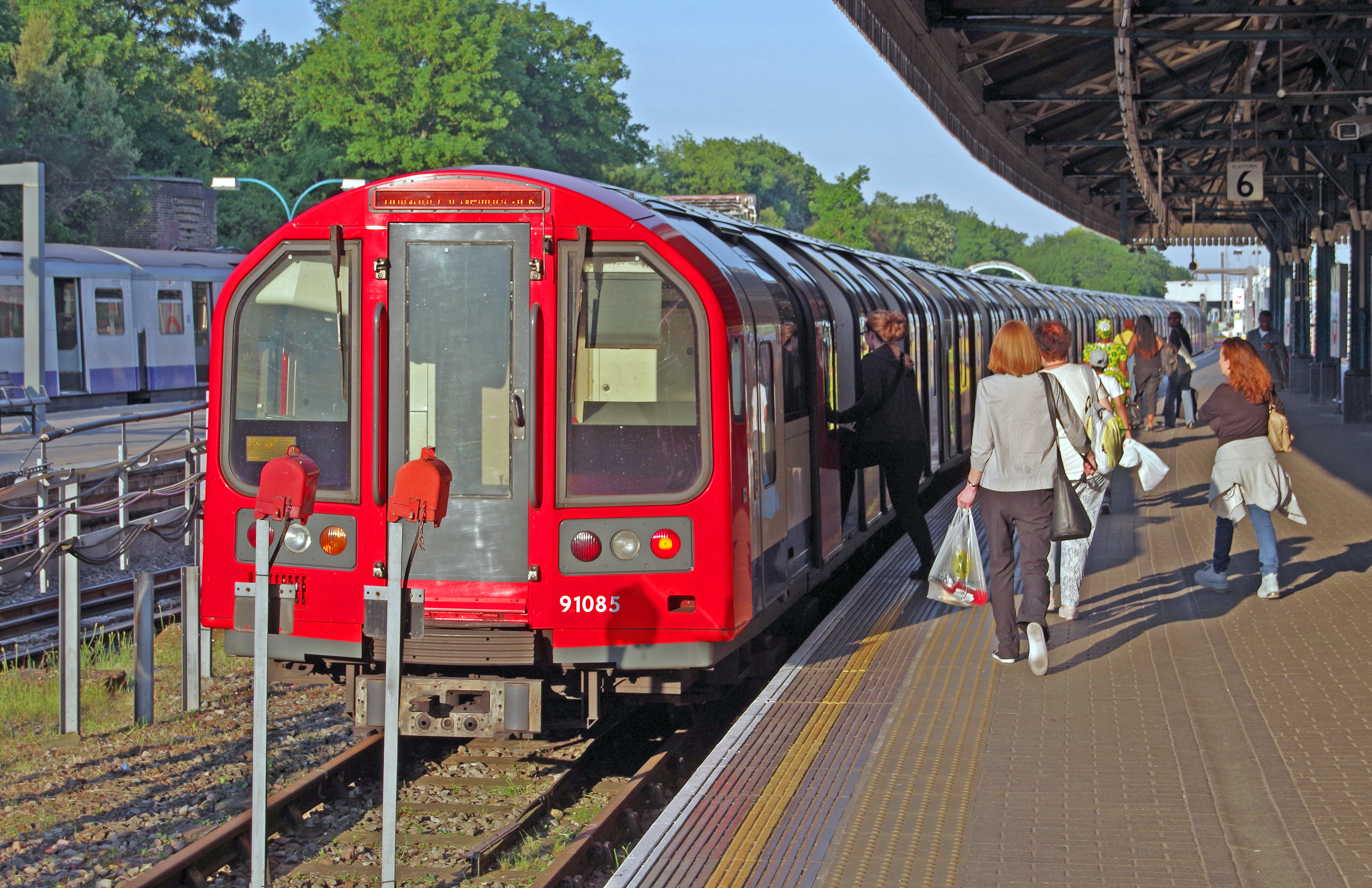
A Central line train of 1992 Stock at platform 6

The typical off-peak service in trains per hour is:

- 9 tph to Newbury Park of which 6 continue to Hainault (Central line)
- 6 tph to Upminster via Earl's Court (District line)

The Central line also operates a night service on Friday and Saturday nights as part of the Night Tube. The station is served by a train every 20 minutes to Hainault and from Loughton.

Preceding station	London Underground	Following station
Terminus	Central line Ealing Broadway branch	West Acton towards Epping, Hainault or Woodford via Newbury Park
Terminus	District line Ealing Broadway branch	Ealing Common towards Upminster, High Street Kensington or Edgware Road
Preceding station	Elizabeth line	Following station
West Ealing towards Heathrow Terminal 4	Elizabeth line	Acton Main Line towards Abbey Wood
West Ealing towards Heathrow Terminal 5	Elizabeth line	Paddington towards Shenfield
Southall towards Maidenhead or Reading	Elizabeth line	Paddington towards Abbey Wood
Former services
West Ealing towards Windsor	District Railway 1883-1885	Ealing Common towards Mansion House

== Connections ==
The station is served by several London Buses routes day and night.
