= Brent Cross West railway station =

National Rail station in London, England

Brent Cross West
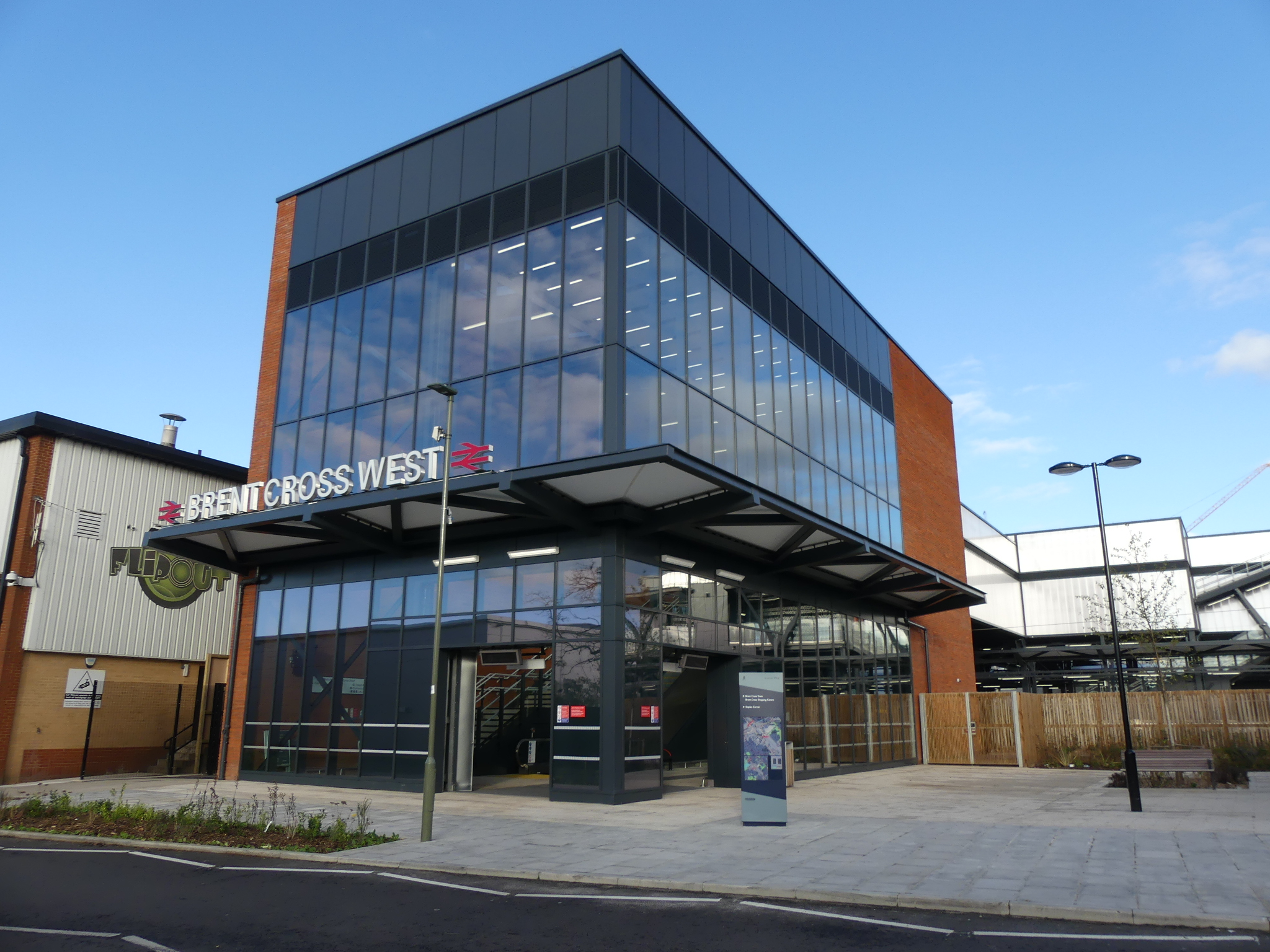
- The western entrance to the station, seen a day after opening
- Interactive map of Brent Cross West

General information
- Location: Brent Cross, London, England
- Managed by: Thameslink
- Owner: Network Rail
- Station code: BCZ
- Number of platforms: 4
- Accessible: Yes
- Fare zone: 3

National Rail annual entry and exit
- 2023–24: 0.140 million
- 2024–25: ▲0.675 million

Key dates
- 10 December 2023: Opened

Other information
- External links: Departures; Facilities
- Coordinates: 51.5687°N 0.2269°W

Brent Cross West is a railway station on the Thameslink route and on the Midland Main Line. The station serves Brent Cross and the northern parts of Cricklewood and Dollis Hill areas of north London. The station is part of the Brent Cross Town development, which also includes an investment to Cricklewood station further down the line. The station was opened on 10 December 2023.

== History ==
=== Brent Cross Town development ===
Construction is underway for Brent Cross Town, a 14,000,000 square feet (1.3 km^{2}) development of a new town centre in Brent Cross. The plan includes the new station, expanding jobs by around 27,000, building 7,500 homes, expanding Brent Cross Shopping Centre, a new hotel, cinema, a new bus station, and new roads.

==== Cricklewood station ====
The developers of Brent Cross Town have included in their project a plan to upgrade facilities at Cricklewood railway station, which lies 1.5 kilometres (0.93 mi) south of the Brent Cross West station site. The platforms at Cricklewood cannot accommodate longer 12-car trains, but the new Brent Cross West platforms can accommodate the longer trains. Rumours that Cricklewood station would close when the new station opened were refuted by the development company.

=== Construction ===
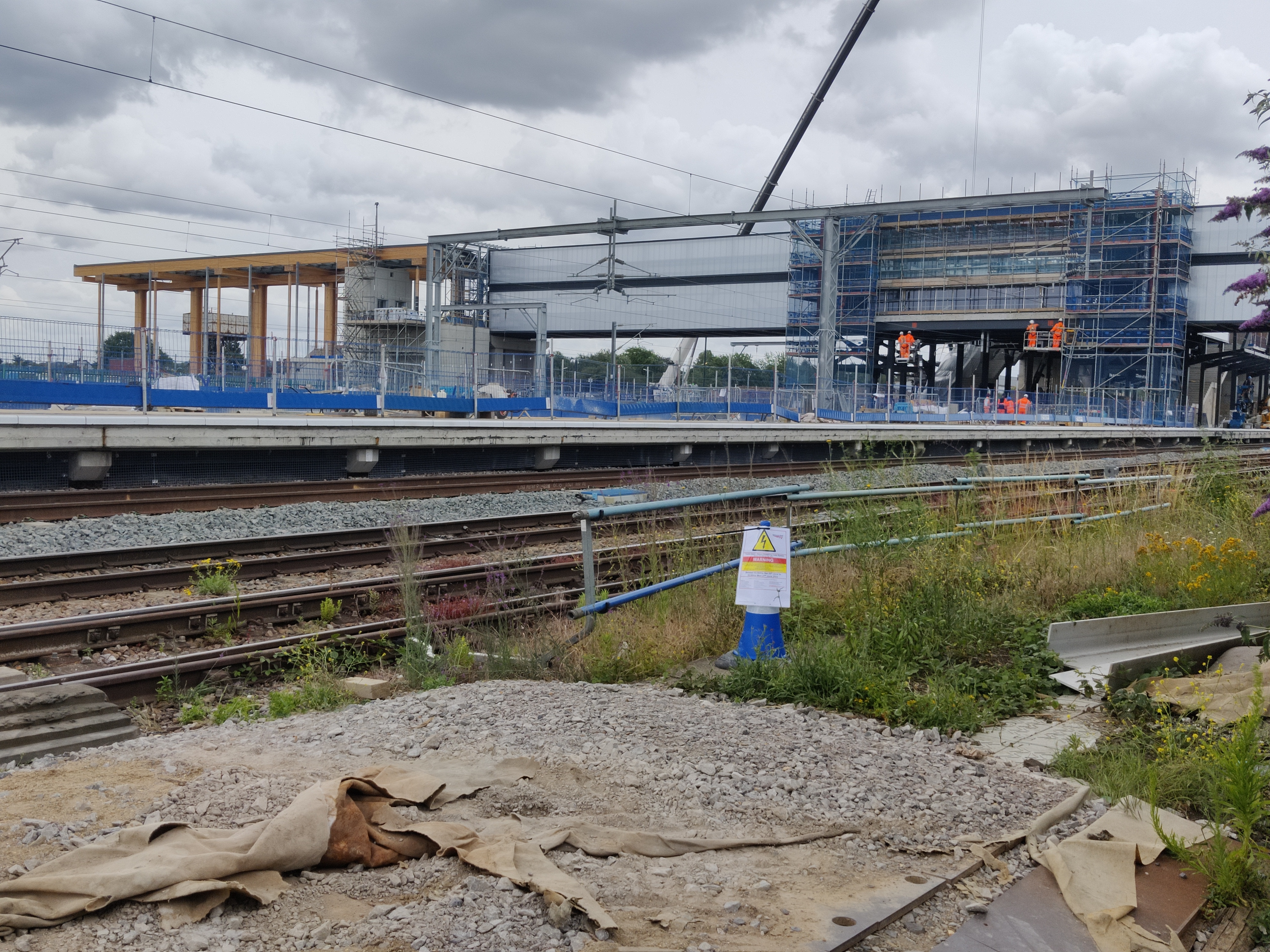
Brent Cross West station under construction in June 2022

On 23 December 2019, VolkerFitzpatrick signed a contract with Barnet Council to design and build the station. Planning permission was granted by Barnet London Borough Council in May 2020. Work to clear the site began in June 2020 and construction of the foundations began in November 2020. The lines through the site were realigned in summer 2021.

On 22 June 2023, it was announced that the station had passed essential platform tests and that an opening date was being planned for the following Autumn.

On 10 November 2023, it was announced that the station would be opening to passenger service on 10 December 2023.

== Location ==
The station is on the former site of the Cricklewood TMD (traction maintenance depot), which was used by East Midlands Railway and Thameslink, between existing Cricklewood and Hendon stations. The depot was moved slightly south onto a bigger site.

Following the expansion of the Thameslink network under the Thameslink Programme, longer 12-carriage trains can now operate on the northern section, and Brent Cross West station was constructed with longer platforms that can accommodate the longer train formations.

== Further plans ==
In 2017 a proposal to extend the London Overground network to Hendon via Brent Cross West was announced by the London Assembly and Transport for London. The scheme, known as the West London Orbital envisages re-opening the Dudding Hill Line to passenger services and running trains from West Hampstead Thameslink and Hendon to Hounslow via the planned Old Oak Common Lane station. The plans are currently at public consultation stage with TfL, although enabling works to make the station compatible with a future upgrade have been delayed.

An earlier proposal to construct a light rail system serving Brent Cross, Harlesden and Brent Cross tube station was put forward in 2010, but the scheme, known as the North and West London Light Railway, did not go ahead.

== Services ==
All services at Brent Cross West are operated by Thameslink using Class 700 EMUs.

The typical off-peak service in trains per hour is:

- 4 tph to St Albans City (all stations)
- 2 tph to Luton (all stations except Hendon)
- 2 tph to Rainham via Dartford
- 4 tph to Sutton (2 of these run via Mitcham Junction and 2 run via Wimbledon)

During the peak hours, the station is served by additional services between Luton and Orpington via Catford, as well as some late evening services to and from Bedford.

The station is also served by a night service between Bedford and Three Bridges on Sunday to Friday nights. EMR services do not currently operate at this station.

| Preceding station | National Rail | Following station |
|---|---|---|
| Hendon | Thameslink Thameslink | Cricklewood |

== Connections ==
London Buses routes 189 and 316 serve the station.
