= Brent Cross Town =

Development in Brent Cross, London, England

Coordinates: 51.5738°N 0.2222°W

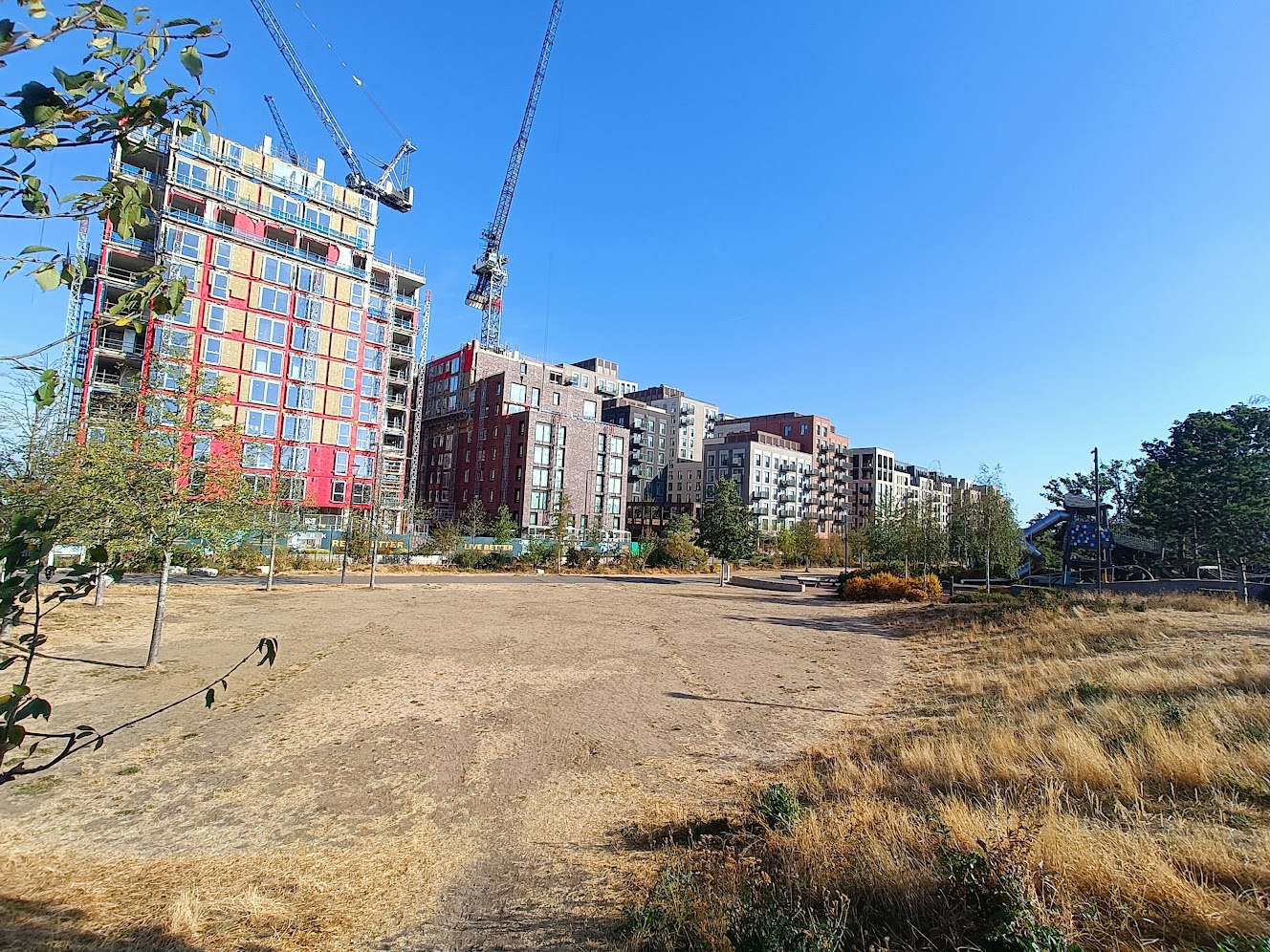
Brent Cross Town under construction in August 2026

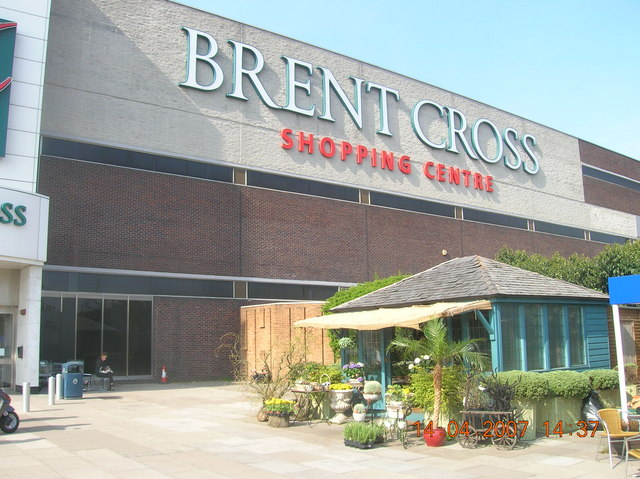
The existing Brent Cross Shopping Centre

Brent Cross Town is a new town centre development located between Hendon and Cricklewood, in London. The development will include 6,700 homes, workspace for 25,000 people, parks, transport improvements and a 592,000 sq ft (55,000 m^{2}) extension of Brent Cross Shopping Centre. In 2024 the expected cost of the regeneration project was suggested to be £8 billion.

In July 2018 it was reported that the shopping centre extension would be delayed. In March 2019, the government granted over £300 million to Barnet Council to deliver the new station and other infrastructure necessary for the development. In November 2019, the developers and the council agreed a new timetable in which the shopping centre expansion would come later in the development. The shopping centre redevelopment plans were re-visited in 2026.

The developers of the scheme are Related Argent. The scheme is a joint venture between Barnet Council and the developer. Construction was started in 2020 and the first residents started to move in during 2025.

== History ==
In 2003, planning permission for a 27,000 sq m extension to Brent Cross Shopping Centre was rejected by the Office of the Deputy Prime Minister, because of its over reliance on car transport, and because sentiment had moved away from "out-of-town" shopping centres – which Brent Cross was considered to be. Brent Cross was designated by the Mayor of London in the London Plan as a 'proposed opportunity area'.

In a renewed effort to improve the area, the London Borough of Barnet approved a "Brent Cross, Cricklewood and West Hendon Development Framework" plan in 2004. This was to redevelop the whole Brent Cross district on both sides of the North Circular Road, not just the shopping centre. There would be more shops (retaining the old shopping centre), but also extensive new housing and offices, along with attempts made to regenerate West Hendon and Cricklewood.

The document stated that,

It is forecast that the land use proposals within the Framework will generate 132,800 new person trips per 12-hour weekday into the area, including 29,100 additional vehicles. An additional 35,800 passengers per day will arrive by bus and 28,900 passengers will arrive by rail or underground. Walking and cycle journeys will be shorter in distance and many of these will be made entirely within the area.

The local planning authority's estimate of "29,100 additional vehicles" (for a 12-hour weekday period) was a mobilising issue for local environmental, transport and residential groups, in their opposition to the planned redevelopment.

The plans were promoted by the Greater London Authority, the major land owners, developers and the local authority, and became Supplementary Planning Guidance, and were incorporated into Barnet's Unitary Development Plan. Since then, redevelopment of the West Hendon housing area, further north on the A5 road, has been dealt with separately.

The shopping centre developers are the owners of Brent Cross Shopping Centre (Hammerson and Standard Life Investments). In 2025 Hammerson increased its stake to over 90%. Barnet Council owns the freehold of the shopping centre, and much of the land to the south of the North Circular Road. The council purchased land in the area via a compulsory purchase order.

== Planning applications ==
The developers first made their plans for the development public in October 2006. Further planning proposals for the development were later submitted to Barnet London Borough Council on 25 March 2008, partly in outline, followed by the required transport assessment in November 2008. Barnet Council extended the planning consultation, so public comments, support and objections could be made. A planning application of this size requires the approval of the local borough and the Mayor of London, and can also be reviewed by the Secretary of State.

Mayor of London Boris Johnson signalled his support in principle to the development, subject to certain concerns regarding the design, social housing and transport links being addressed. The Greater London Authority's report included criticisms and challenges from Transport for London. The London boroughs of Brent and Camden, whose roads border the development area, formally objected. Although the planning application stresses the importance of walking, cycling and public transport, specialist organisations such as the London Cycling Campaign and the Campaign for Better Transport also objected. Local residents and Friends of the Earth objected to the proposals for a new waste facility on the edge of the development and a coalition of objectors, Coalition for a Sustainable Brent Cross Cricklewood, was formed.

Consequently, the developers added supplementary documents to the application, with Barnet Council again extending the planning consultation, in addition to twice postponing the committee meeting to consider the application. The council officers formally recommended approval of the application and the planning committee gave outline approval on 19 November 2009.

On 16 March 2010 the then Secretary of State for Communities and Local Government John Denham issued a 'stop notice' directing Barnet London Borough Council not to grant planning permission to Brent Cross Cricklewood without specific authorisation. In June 2010 it was announced that the Secretary of State for Communities and Local Government Eric Pickles would not be recommending the holding of a public inquiry for the development. The Council issued planning consent on 26 October 2010.

Subsequent further planning applications have been made, for individual plots, such as:

Co-living homes: A development of 352 co-living homes designed by Assael Architecture and Exteriors for Halcyon Development Partners and DTZ Investors was approved. This will have vast communal areas and amenities such as a gym, spa and co-working space.

Retirement living homes: Planning permission was granted for 148 retirement homes for people over sixty, via the Audley Group and Senior Living Investment Partners (SLIP), which will be operated by Audley Group. Planned amenities include a village hall, a health and wellness centre, residents’ lounge, outdoor gardens and terraces as well as a café/ bistro.

In 2026, the plans to extend Brent Cross Shopping Centre were being finalised and are expected to include an additional 150 shops, 50 restaurants, a cinema complex and a hotel.

== Construction ==
Construction commenced in 2020, with early enabling infrastructure work completed by Galldris. Exploratory Park, a new public park, opened in August 2020. The park features a water fountain incorporating a design by architect Jonathan Wren. A community survey commissioned by Barnet Council reported that 87% of local residents rated the park "very good" or "excellent" for promoting wellbeing and community engagement.

In October 2020, the developers Related Argent released their plans for the new town, including facilities for sport and play, pedestrian-friendly routes and being a net zero carbon town by 2030. A visitors pavilion was constructed that included a cafe and that created a space for exhibitions and events. People were able to learn about the masterplan for Brent Cross Town. It was awarded a 2024 RIBA London Award, with the jury praising its sustainability credentials and it being a calm and welcoming community space.

Residential properties include The Ashbee and The Delamarre, which have views over Claremont Park. These will include stone countertops, excellent Wi-Fi and mobile signals, intelligent storage, energy-efficient LEDs, underfloor heating and instant boiling water taps.

Many contractors are involved in the project, including Galldris Group (groundwork and infrastructure) Allies and Morrison (masterplan), Woods Bagot (interior design for the first phase of residential developments), Gillespies (landscape planning and the public realm masterplan), Vattenfall (heat network), Waterman Group (infrastructure and environmental activities), Munnelly Support Services (logistics and security) and Maccreanor Lavington, Whittam Cox Architects and Townshend Landscape Architects (design and architectural work).

The substation, which will provide 100% renewable energy to Brent Cross Town, was built using salvaged oil pipeline steel and low carbon, low/no cement concrete. The structure is also the largest permanent public artwork in the UK, has an array of colour, with a motivational message of "Here we come, Here we rise and shine," surrounding it, that was created by artist Lakwena. In March 2024, it was reported that it had won a Civic Trust Award.

The business and innovation district started to be built in the summer of 2024. BAM was chosen to build 3 Copper Square, with Sheffield Hallam University creating their first campus in London, on the lower six floors. The architects were shedkm and the structure is cross-laminated timber and concrete with exposed timber soffits. The building includes private and communal terraces. The 14 storey building, now known as 4 Arbour Street, was completed in the summer of 2026. It is located next to Brent Cross West station and was built on a site that previously had railway servicing yards.

A 4.3-metre-high water feature, called 'The Fountain' has been built in Neighbourhood Square. Mark Nixon, of design company NEON commented "The Fountain offers calm moments through its sound and movement, but it also invites light-hearted interaction, especially from children. That duality felt important for a public space like this.”

== Charity and community ==
A number of grants, valued between £3,000 and £10,000 have been awarded to local organisations from the Brent Cross Town 2025 Community Fund. Since the launch of the fund in 2019, £230,000 has been awarded to good causes, with 57 charities and community organisations benefiting, up until 2026. Some of the organisations who received grants in 2025 included RC Vision CIC, a charity that uses innovative methods to inspire children to study science and engineering, Scope, the Construction Youth Trust and the Arts Depot Trust. In the previous year, Sustainable Barnet, a project run by Motivez won a grant to facilitate relationships between science, technology and mathematics professionals and young people disproportionately impacted by climate change.

== Transport ==
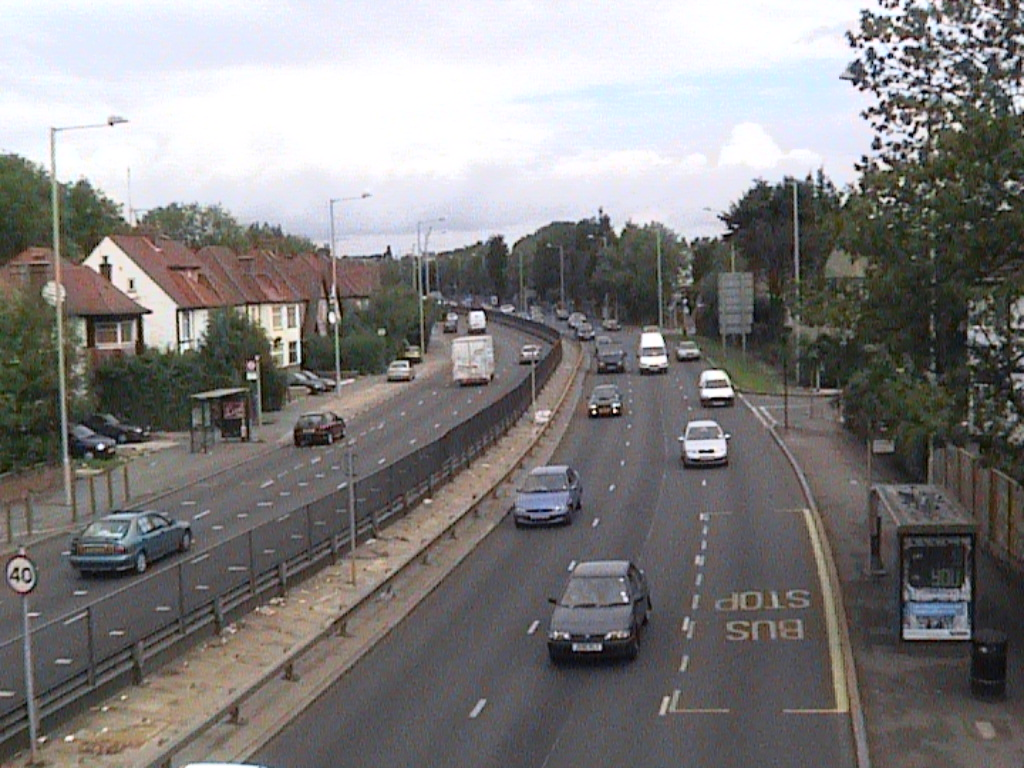
The A406 near Brent Cross Shopping Centre and Brent Cross Underground Station

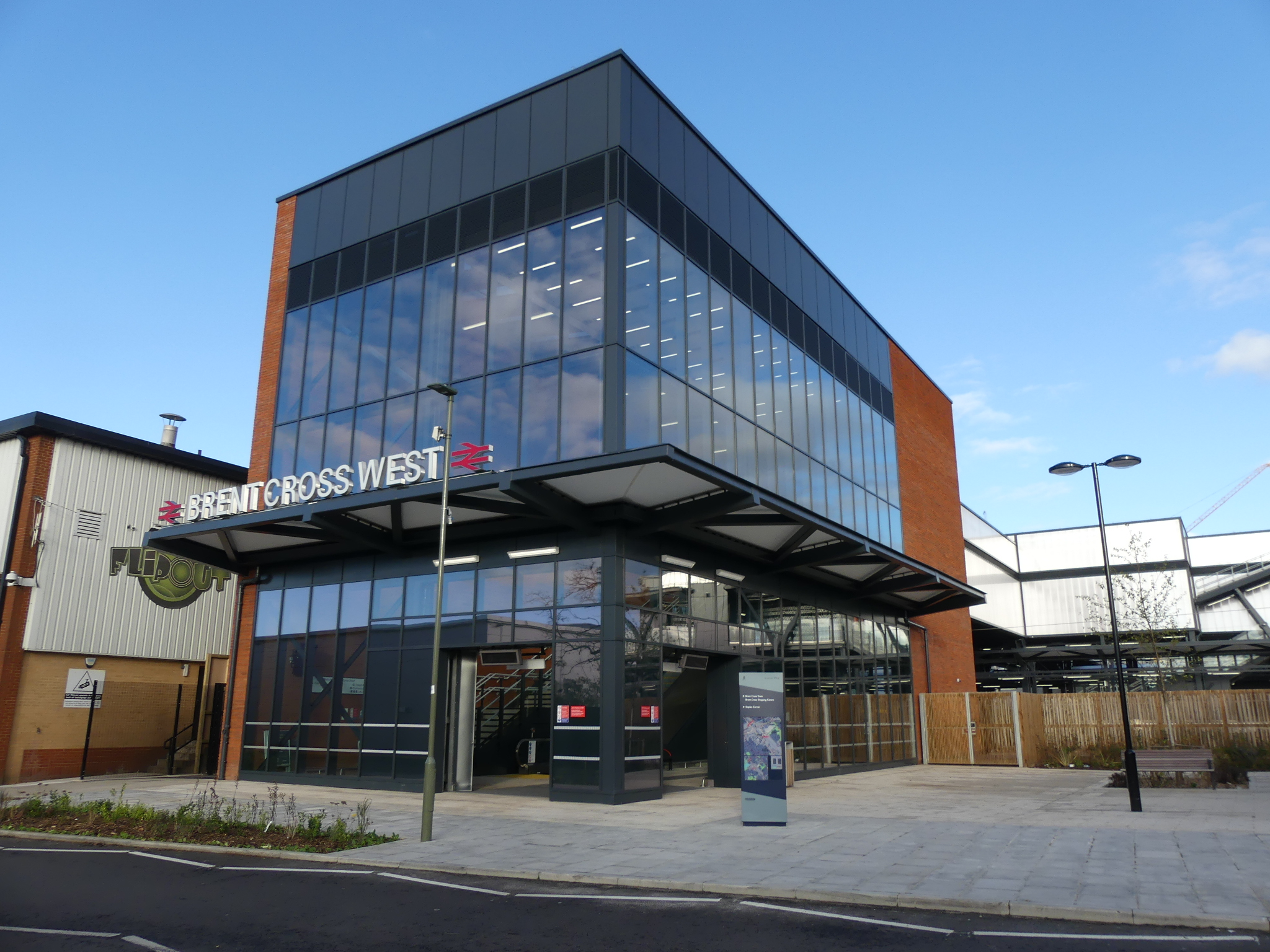
Western entrance of the new Brent Cross West station

An investment of around £500 million in transport infrastructure is planned as part of the development, including:

- A new bridge over the A406
- The redevelopment of Brent Cross bus station
- The redevelopment of Brent Cross Underground Station
- The redevelopment of Cricklewood railway station
- A new Brent Cross West railway station
- Redevelopment of the Staples Corner junction
- A new junction with the A5 and a new link bridge over the road
- A new junction with the A41
- The construction of five new pedestrian bridges

In December 2023, Brent Cross West railway station opened. The cost of the new station was £419 million and it is served by trains on the Thameslink cross-London route. It is in London fare zone 3. The Mayor of London attended the opening. This station also provides pedestrians with a overbridge that connects the A5 to the residential area being developed, improving local transport for walkers and cyclists, providing a connection between two areas separated for over 150 years.

== See also ==
- King's Cross Central
- Stratford City
