= Orbital railways in London =

Orbital railways around London

Orbital railways in London have existed since 1884, with the completion of the Circle Line jointly operated by the Metropolitan Railway and District Railway. Several other circular railways existed but were short-lived, including the Middle Circle and Super Outer Circle. The most recent orbital railway was completed in 2012, served by the London Overground's Windrush and Mildmay lines, combining the North, East, South and West London lines at Clapham Junction and Highbury & Islington to form a somewhat circular route.

== History ==
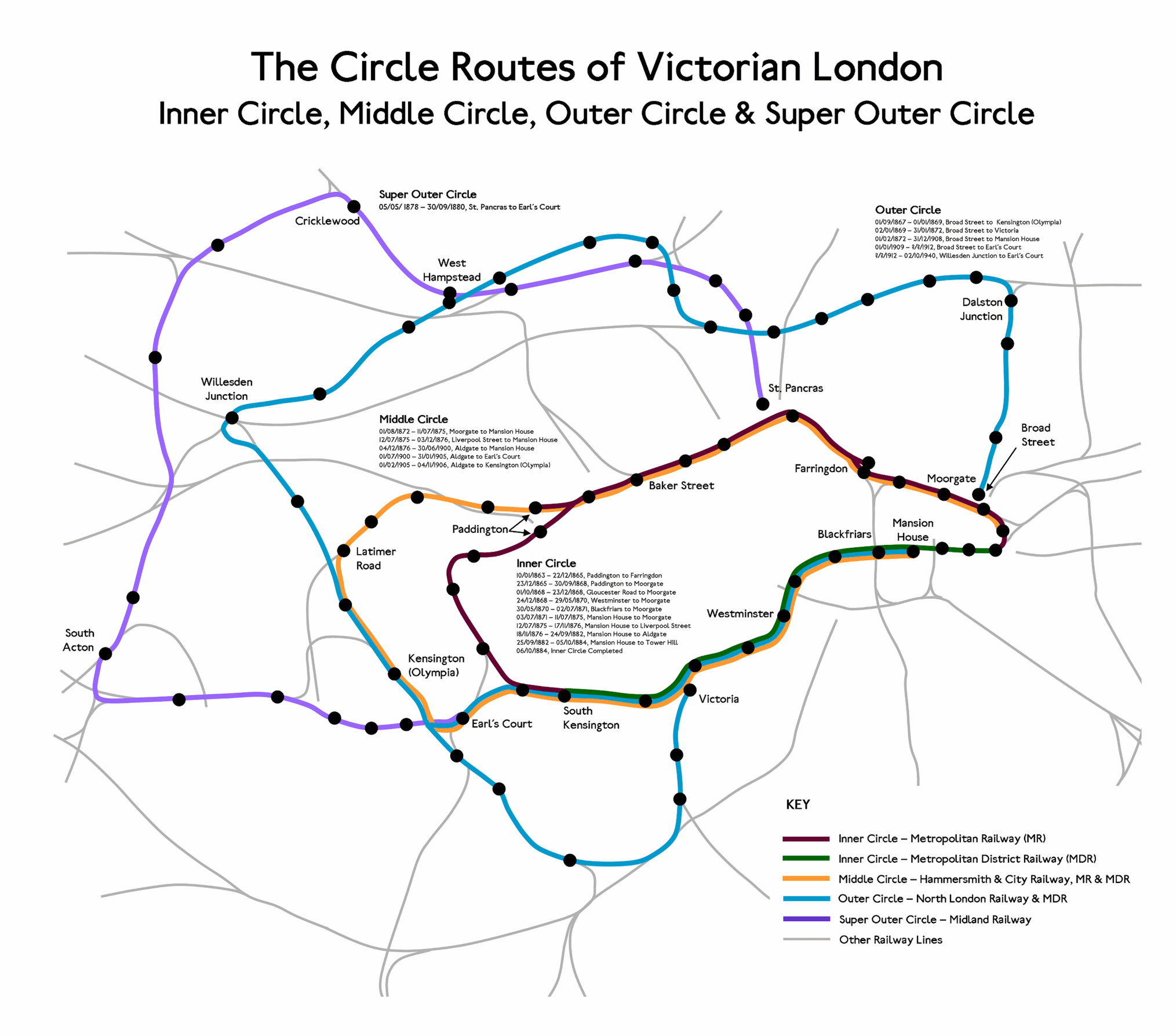
The Inner Circle and other circular routes

London's railway system was largely built in the 19th century, by competing private companies. The benefits of an integrated transport system were unknown at this time and each main-line railway company built its own terminus in central London and operated radial routes from that point. For example, Waterloo railway station in south-west central London is the focus of lines radiating out to the south and west. Meanwhile, metropolitan and suburban railways developed also on radial lines.

The first orbital rail service was the Inner Circle, now the Circle line, operated over the central sections of the Metropolitan line and District line. This linked most of the main-line stations and was a commercial success.

This success led to the operation of a number of other semi-orbital routes within the capital, over existing main-line routes and sections of the Inner Circle:

- Middle Circle – Aldgate to Mansion House via Addison Road (now Kensington Olympia)
- Outer Circle – Broad Street to Mansion House via Willesden Junction
- Super Outer Circle – St Pancras to Earl's Court via Cricklewood and South Acton

London was a much smaller city than it is now and most commercial activity was focused at the centre. These outer routes failed to attract the passenger numbers hoped for and were eventually cut back or ended while other, more radial services on the lines continued.

Other semi-orbital routes fared little better. Throughout the 20th century London's railways operated on a radial model and the few remaining semi-orbital passenger routes withered, with the lines used mainly for freight services. The national railway network was privatised with radial franchises. Only the Circle line enjoyed success.

Throughout the 20th century London expanded both in size and population and employment ceased to be as heavily concentrated in the centre. Many more people were travelling through central London by Underground and many of them were travelling in on one radial route only to travel out again on another. Congestion increased and additional Underground lines were built at great expense.

The idea of reviving and expanding the semi-orbital routes to relieve some of the load on central London in a more cost-effective way than the building of new tube lines was considered, coalescing around the suggested name "Orbirail", but it won few friends in the National Rail network for commercial and operational reasons.

The situation changed drastically with the creation of Transport for London as a single body with overall responsibility for transport in London. During Ken Livingstone's term as Mayor of London, TfL exploited the potential in the neglected peripheral rail routes and started to plan a complete orbital rail system by joining these routes together (albeit with no plan for a single fully orbital service). The new system was eventually launched as the London Overground, and by 2012 it covered a route which bears a striking resemblance to the Outer Circle line, with the East London line extension and South London line being used to complete the loop.

Political support for more orbital railways in London continued after the change of leadership following the 2008 London mayoral election. During his election campaign, Boris Johnson published a transport manifesto which highlighted the problems associated with orbital journeys around London

== Orbital railway proposals ==
=== RingRail ===
In 1973, a report was published by independent analysts GL Crowthers, PH Vickers and AD Piling which advocated the creation of a RingRail orbital railway line around outer London. The scheme largely involved reusing existing railways that looped around London. In East London, the RingRail route would have crossed the River thames via a new tunnel between Stratford/West Ham and Westcombe Park/Blackheath. The plan also envisaged relocating Clapham Junction railway station to a new site further north, where the proposed RingRail line would run underneath the new station. A similar proposal was included in the 1974 Barren Report, but it was not supported by British Rail.

=== Orbirail ===
Orbirail was a suggested orbital railway route around London. It would have connected the extended North London line, East London line, the South London line and the West London line, possibly including the Gospel Oak to Barking line. The combined line would have orbited London in Zone 2, Zone 3 and (possibly) Zone 4.

==== Status ====
Although Orbirail had no official status as a planned project, it was completed on 9 December 2012 with the extension of the London Overground from Surrey Quays to Clapham Junction, closing the complete loop of London Overground train services on the East London line, South London line, West London line and North London line, although trains do not run round the complete loop in a go, with changes at Clapham Junction and Highbury & Islington needed to travel the whole loop.

On 12 February 2009, Mayor Boris Johnson and Transport Secretary Geoff Hoon announced £75 Million to fund the southern extension of the Overground network between Surrey Quays and Clapham Junction as part of the East London line extension, creating the final connection of an orbital railway for London to be completed in time for the 2012 Summer Olympics. However, the timeline published by TfL in April 2011 stated the line would not open until late 2012, well after both the Summer Olympics and Paralympics.

Since November 2024, the services on the loop are named the Mildmay line (which goes via Willesden Junction in the north west) and Windrush line (which goes via Surrey Quays in the south east), joining at Clapham Junction and Highbury & Islington.

=== R25 ===
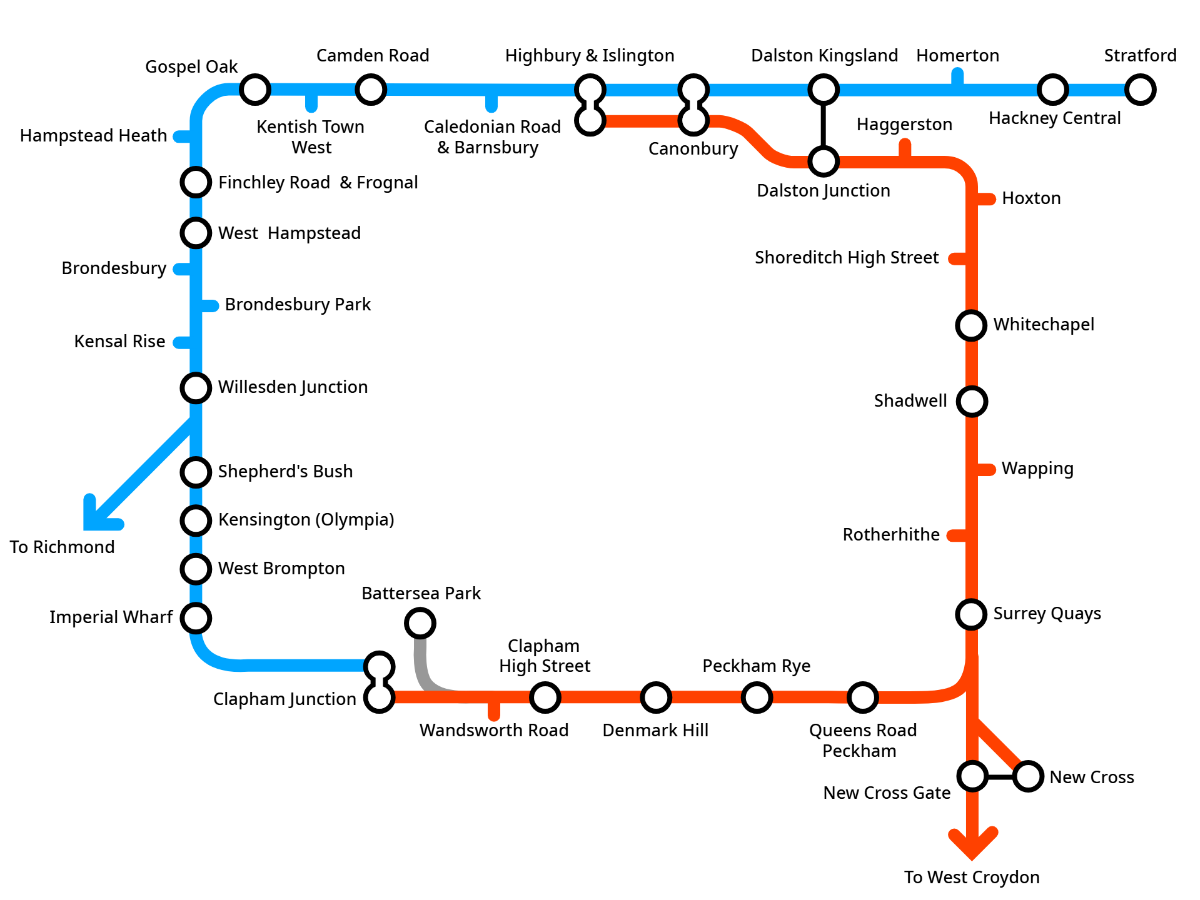
A stylised map of the orbital portions of the London Overground.

The R25 was a proposed railway orbital around the Zone 3 area of London. First proposed in the Mayor of London's £1.3 trillion London Infrastructure 2050 plan, the line would have used some existing Network Rail and London Overground lines, linked by stretches of new railway. Any plans to extend the Suffragette line past Barking Riverside station were dropped favour of extending the DLR to Thamesmead.
