= Cross-city route =

Public transport route linking two suburbs of a city

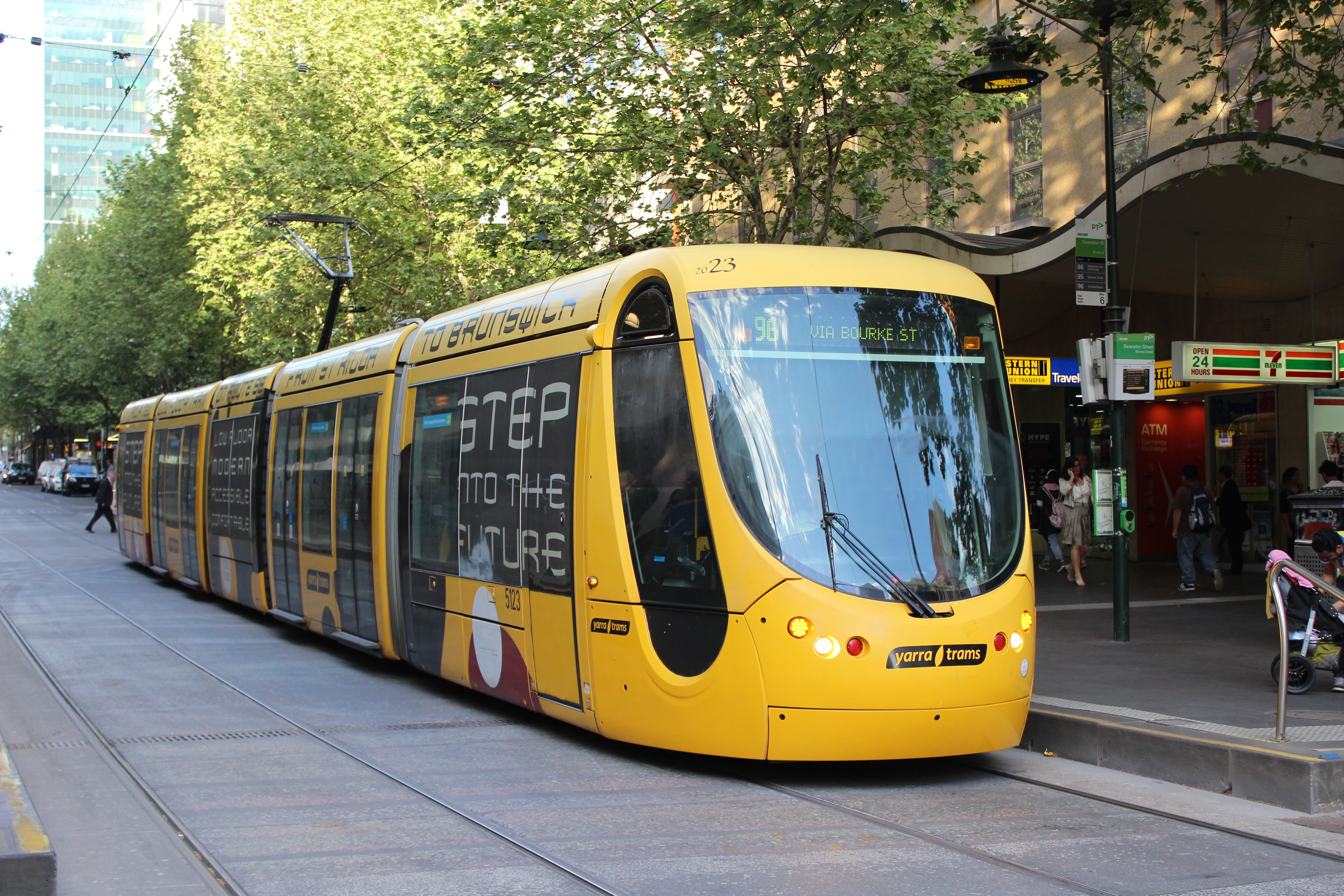
Melbourne tram route 96 is a cross-city route connecting two very different suburbs, East Brunswick and St Kilda.

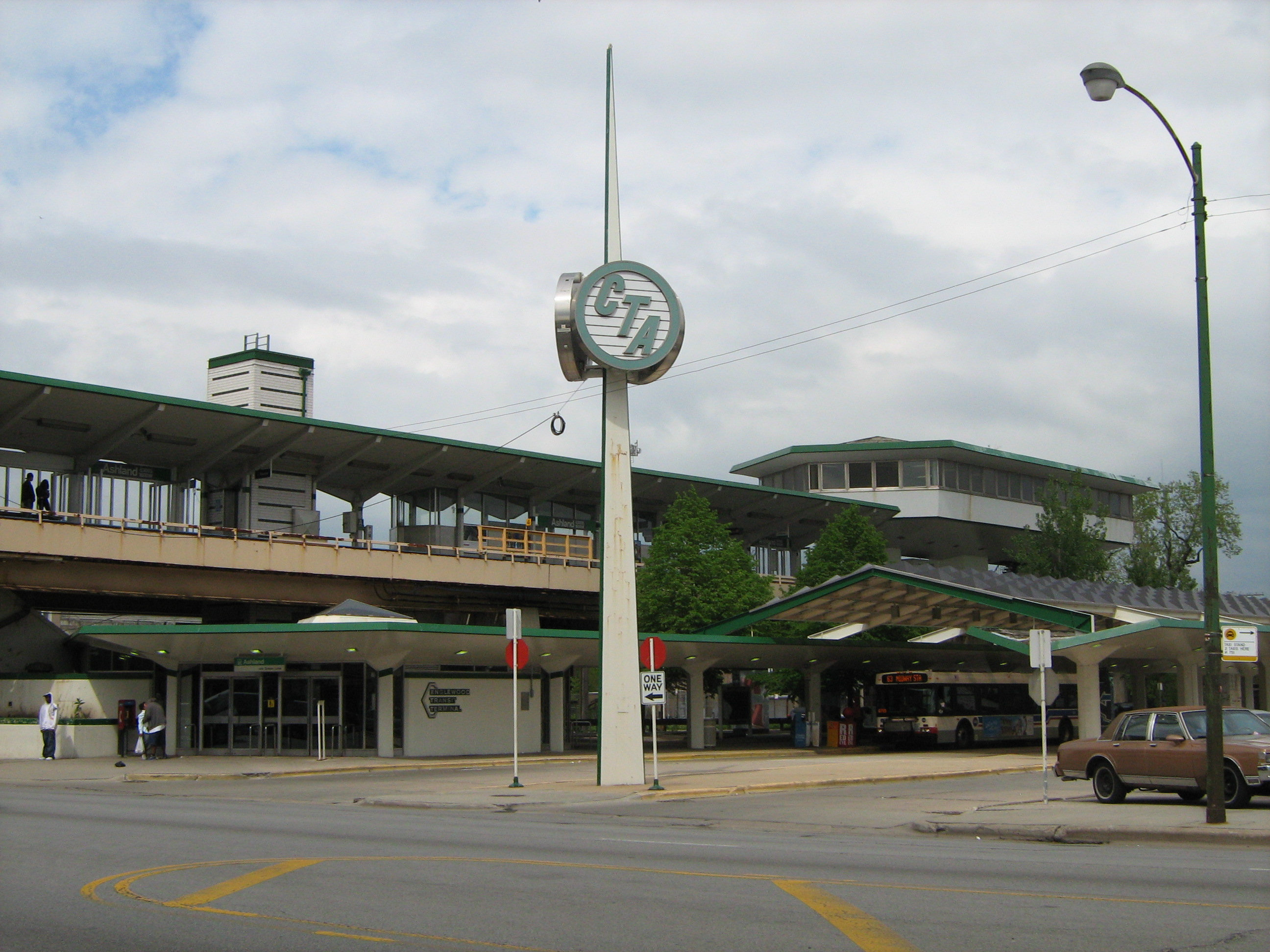
Ashland/63rd CTA station is a terminus of the Green Line, the only through route to run around the Loop on the Chicago 'L' rapid transit system.

A cross-city route is a public transport route linking one (usually relatively distant) suburb or satellite town of a city or metropolitan area with another suburb/satellite on the opposite side of the city, by running directly through the city center or central business district. Such a route can be operated by various forms of public transport, including commuter rail, rapid transit, trams (streetcars), trolleybuses or motor buses.

== Forms of cross-city routes ==
=== Through routes ===
Typically, a cross-city route will be a combination of two radial routes, each linking one of the outer termini with the city or town's central business district (CBD). Such a route is sometimes called a through route. (Note: The term cross-city route is not used in American English, and the similar American English term crosstown route has a distinctly different meaning, referring to a transport route that does not serve the city centre and runs generally perpendicular to radial routes.)

A public transport operator may combine radial routes into a through route because terminating a route in a city or town centre has certain disadvantages, including the following:

- Vehicles can cause congestion while standing between journeys and when turning.
- Valuable land is often occupied with route terminal facilities.
- Time is wasted by vehicles turning round or reversing (reducing vehicle utilization and increasing costs).
- Passengers wishing to travel across the city or town centre will have to change vehicles or walk for part of their journeys. This always takes time, and often requires passengers to search for something (e.g. the correct departure stop). There can also be extra costs and hindrances flowing from these difficulties (especially for passengers with luggage or prams, the elderly, or disabled people), such as fear of loss of a connection due to delays.

On the other hand, there are certain advantages to terminating a route in a city or town centre:

- Schedules are less likely to be disrupted by congestion (since there can be provision for recovery time in the city center).
- Convenient interchange between routes may be provided at a common terminal.
- Fare structures are less complex.

In most cases, the advantages of operating routes across a city or town centre outweigh the disadvantages, but each case must be assessed on its own merits.

=== Other forms ===
Another form of cross-city route is a peripheral cross-city route, which links a pair of (usually distant) suburbs (or satellites) without passing through or close to the CBD. Such routes are also referred to as tangential routes, because they follow a tangential path relative to the centre of a network. In American English, peripheral cross-city routes are called crosstown routes.

Although a public transport route that links nearby suburbs without passing through the CBD would fall within this description, such a route will commonly be set up, and better described, as a feeder route to either a radial route or a through route heading towards the CBD.

== See also ==
- Circle route
- Transport hub
