= West London Orbital =

Proposed rail line in England

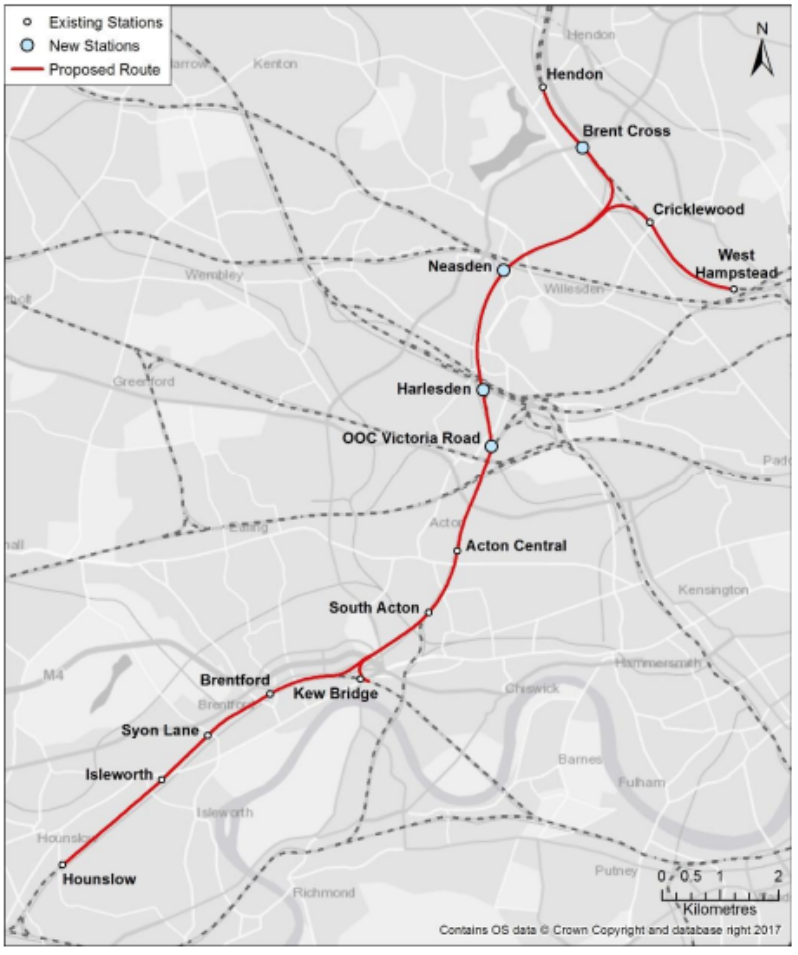
- Route map of the proposed West London Orbital extension of the London Overground network
- Location: London boroughs of Barnet, Brent, Ealing, Hounslow, United Kingdom
- Proposer: West London Alliance group of local authorities
- Project website: tfl.gov.uk
- Status: Proposal
- Type: Commuter rail (London Overground extension)
- Cost estimate: £264M
- Completion date: 2020s or 2030s
- Stakeholders: Greater London Authority; Transport for London; Network Rail

The West London Orbital is a £900 million proposed extension to the London Overground suburban rail system in North and West London.

Rather than requiring significant lengths of new track or tunnels to be built, the extension would make use of a combination of existing freight and passenger lines including the Dudding Hill line, North London line and Hounslow Loop line. The route would run for approximately 11 miles (18 km) from Hendon at the northern end to Hounslow at the western end via Brent Cross West, Neasden, Harlesden, Old Oak Common, South Acton and Brentford.

If the extension opens, it will improve passenger rail connectivity across outer London suburbs, and establish a number of new connections to existing radial railway infrastructure including Thameslink, the Jubilee line, the Bakerloo line, High Speed 2, and the Elizabeth line. The scheme is supported by the Mayor of London and Transport for London's (TfL) Transport Strategy. TfL launched a public consultation on the scheme on 23 September 2026, which will close on 18 November 2026.

== History ==
=== Earlier proposals ===
A number of routes have previously been examined for new orbital tube and rail lines and improved connectivity across West and North London.

A proposal for a West London Orbital was put forward by West London Business in 2008 to build an underground light rail line from Brent Cross to Surbiton via Wembley Park, Ealing Broadway, Richmond and Kingston.

In 2008, the Campaign for Better Transport advocated the North and West London Light Railway, a light rail rapid transit network using existing or abandoned surface railway corridors.

Orbirail was a 2012 proposal for an outer "super loop" service roughly equivalent to a M25 for rail. As an alternative to rail, the Park Royal Partnership proposed a 'FastBus' scheme of limited-stop buses, between Wembley Park and North Acton stations and possibly beyond.

In 2013, Mayor Boris Johnson proposed an orbital railway around the fare zone 3 area of London named the "R25" after the M25 orbital motorway. The mayor of London's £1.3 trillion London Infrastructure 2050 plan envisaged using some existing National Rail and London Overground lines, linked by stretches of new railway.

=== West London Orbital proposals ===
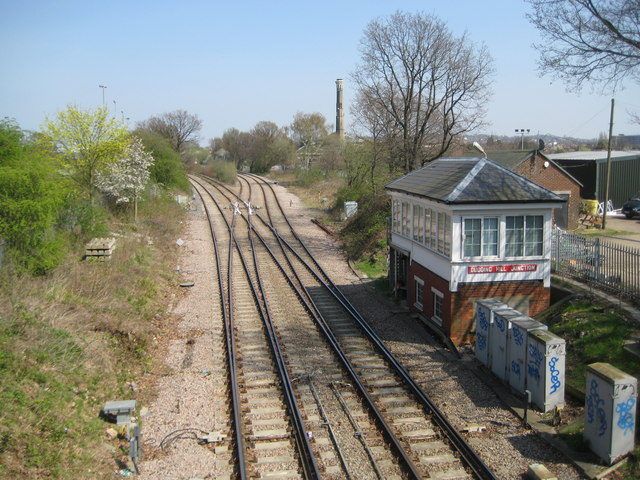
The Dudding Hill freight line, which may be re-opened to passenger services

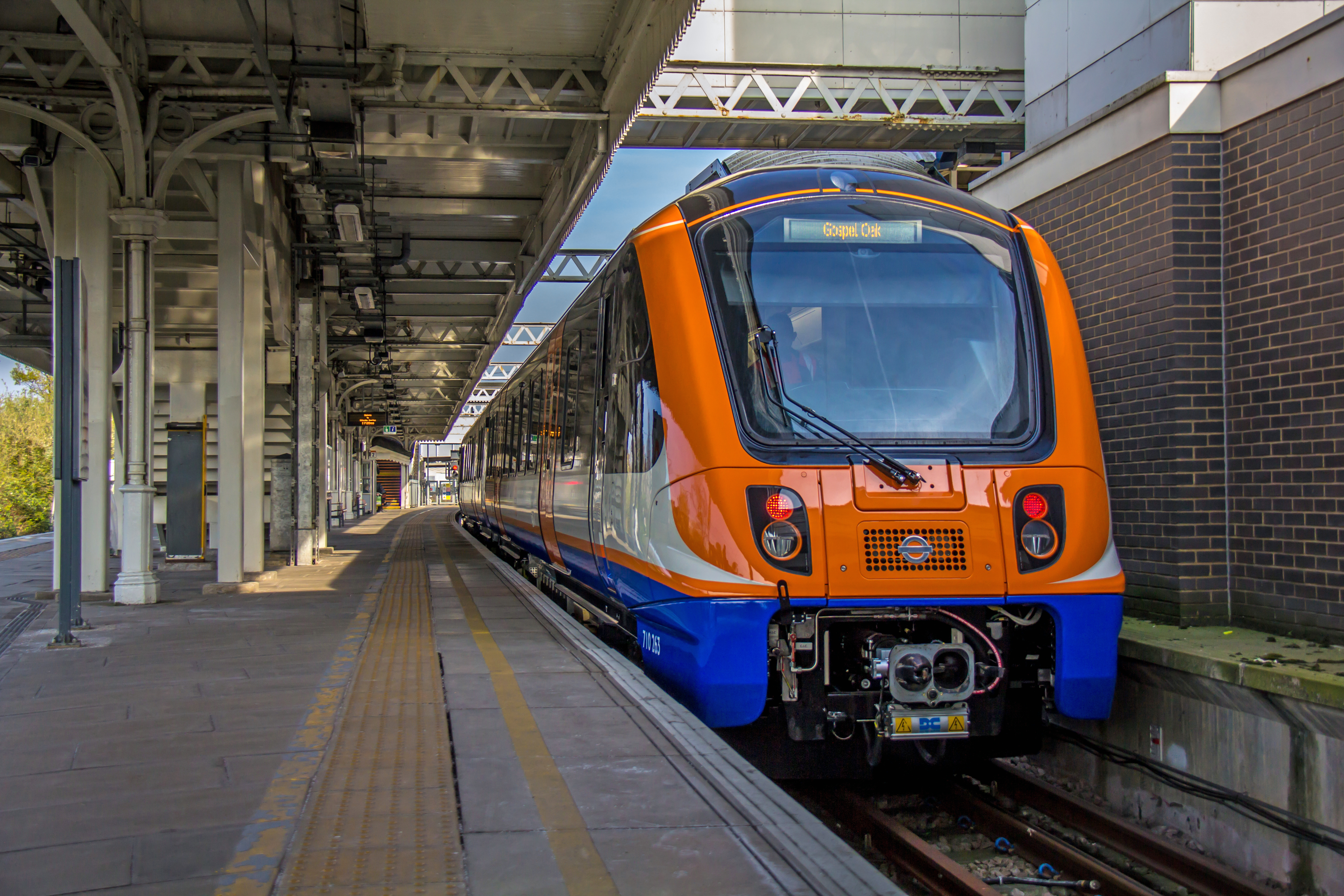
The West London Orbital will form part of the London Overground network

In June 2017 Transport for London (TfL) published the Mayor's Transport Strategy, which stated that London government would work with the relevant boroughs to encourage the development of improved "orbital" public transport connectivity in outer London. A study commissioned in March 2017 the West London Alliance group of London boroughs concluded that there was a good business case for creating a West London Orbital route along the Dudding Hill line.

The Mayor's Transport Strategy published in March 2018 included a Proposal 88 for a new orbital railway line running from Hendon and West Hampstead in North London via a new station at Old Oak Common to Hounslow and Kew Bridge in West London. The West London Alliance group of local authorities expressed support for the West London Orbital scheme, and confirmed that it would be incorporated into all Local Plans. TfL's Strategic Outline Business Case for the scheme published in June 2019 concluded that there was a strong case for the scheme as it had a medium to high benefit-cost ratio.

In March 2026, TfL announced a £6.65 million funding deal between TfL, the boroughs of Barnet, Brent, Ealing and Hounslow, and the Old Oak & Park Royal Development Corporation to progress the scheme further.

A public consultation was launched by TfL in September 2026 inviting comments on a proposed route from Hendon to Hounslow. The proposed branch to West Hampstead is no longer being considered but may be studied in future plans. The consultation will run until 18 November 2026.

=== Progress and funding ===
In October 2026, TfL responded to a freedom of information request disclosing that it would cost £900 million to construct the route excluding the Kew Bridge and West Hampstead branches.

On 28 October 2026, It was announced in the 2026 United Kingdom budget that they will implement modern financing routes for London transport and regeneration, which inside, states a continuation of the Elizabeth Line Business Rates Supplement when it finishes. This could be used to fund the West London Orbital.

== Route ==
Map of the proposed West London Orbital route

The West London Orbital scheme consists of three distinct sections which will make use of existing railway lines:

- the Dudding Hill line
- the North London line and
- the Hounslow Loop line

The Dudding Hill line, opened in 1868, is currently a goods line, roughly 4 miles (6.4 km) long, and has had no scheduled passenger service for over a century. It has no stations, no electrification and a 30 mph (48 km/h) speed limit with semaphore signalling, and is lightly used by freight and very occasional passenger charter trains. Utilising part of the Dudding Hill line would enable a new passenger rail route from Brent Cross West, running south to a junction near the future Old Oak Common station, connecting to the existing North London line Further south at Acton, a short link would connect to the Hounslow Loop, allowing the new route to reach Brentford and Hounslow stations. Taken together, this set of routes would form a new peripheral rapid transit passenger service around West London suburbs, known as the West London Orbital railway.

The proposal would involve building four new stations:

- Neasden, providing interchange with Neasden tube station
- Harlesden, providing interchange with the existing Harlesden station on the Watford DC line
- Old Oak Common Lane, providing interchange with High Speed 2 and the Elizabeth line at the planned Old Oak Common railway station, and with North Acton tube station
- Lionel Road, providing interchange with Kew Bridge railway station

The scheme also includes installing additional platforms at Hendon and Brent Cross West stations. Brent Cross West railway station, one of the proposed new stations on the route, opened on 10 December 2023.

TfL's 2018 proposals had included a branch at the northern end of West London Orbital going to West Hampstead Thameslink via Cricklewood. However, in March 2026, TfL confirmed that the route would run only to Hendon, but a future extension to West Hampstead could be considered in the future.

The southern end of the proposed line is planned to terminate at Hounslow, approximately 3.5 miles (5.6 km) from Heathrow Airport. In 2026, Mayor Sadiq Khan ruled out an extension to the airport as it would face infrastructural and operational constraints and would offer limited benefits. Airport access would instead be provided via the Elizabeth line from Old Oak Common.

Following the naming of the London Overground lines in 2024, Mayor Sadiq Khan confirmed that, if built, the West London Orbital would similarly be given a new line name to reflect the culture and history of areas along the route.

== See also ==
- Super Outer Circle, an orbitail railway line that was operated by the Midland Railway 1878-1880
