= Radial route =

Public transport line from a city centre to a suburb

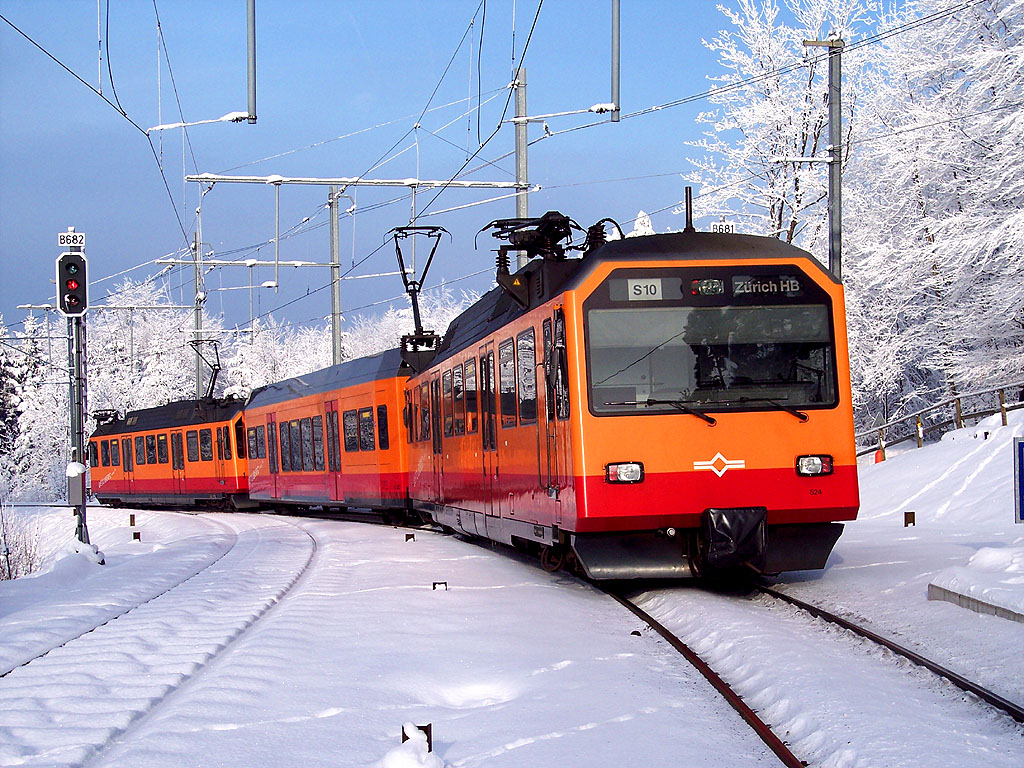
Zurich S-Bahn line S10 is a radial route between Zürich HB and Uetliberg.

A radial route is a public transport route linking a central point in a city or town, usually in the central business district (CBD), with a suburb (or satellite) of that city or town. Such a route can be operated by various forms of public transport, including commuter rail, rapid transit, trams (streetcars), trolleybuses, or motor buses.

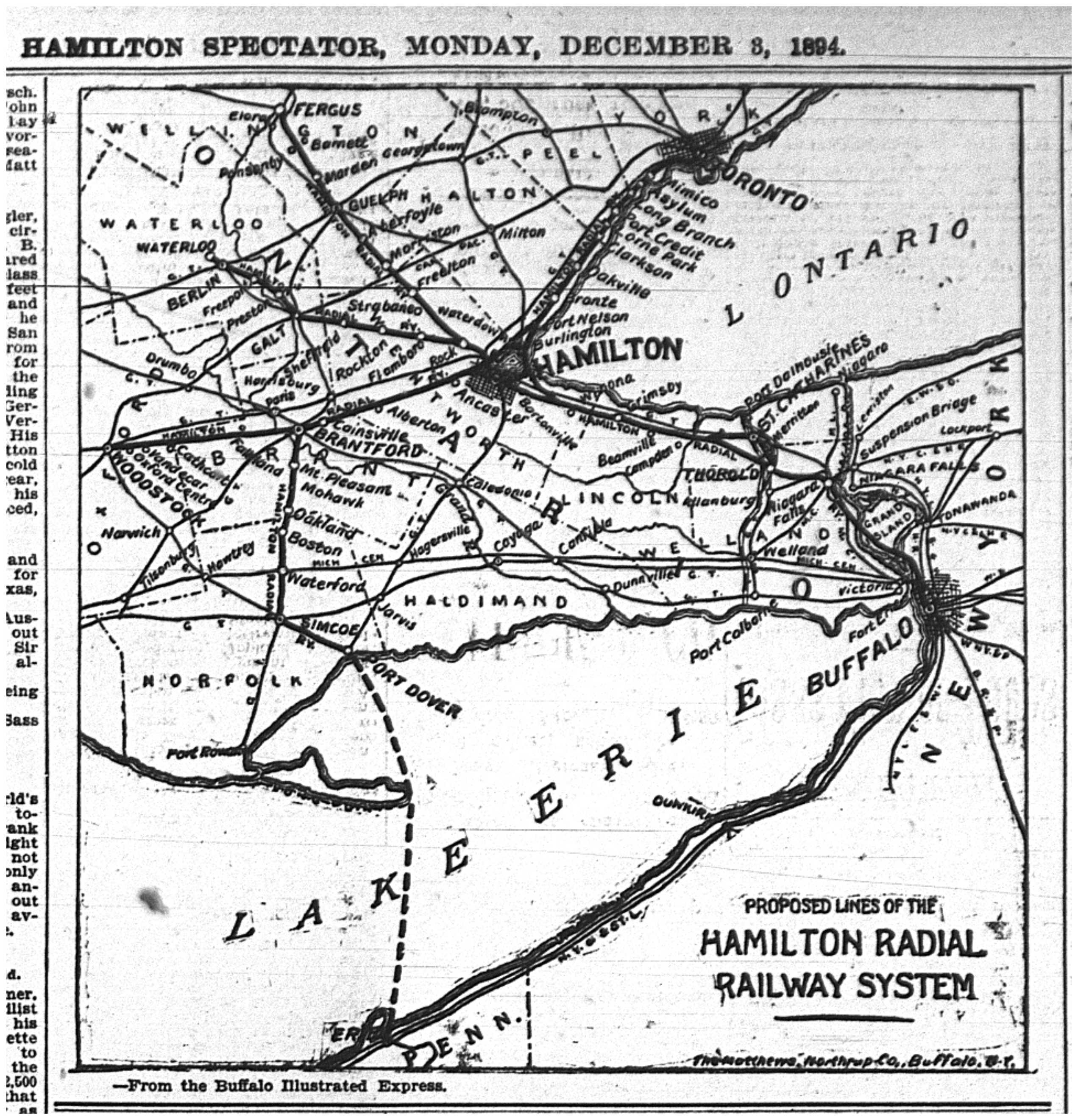
1884 map showing proposed radial railway routes in Hamilton, Canada

Typically, a pair of radial routes will be combined, solely for operational reasons, into a single cross-city route, between one suburb and another suburb. A cross-city route of that type is sometimes called a through route. A public transport operator may combine radial routes into a through route because terminating a route in a city or town centre has certain disadvantages:

- Vehicles can cause congestion while standing between journeys and when turning.
- Valuable land is often occupied with route terminal facilities.
- Time is wasted by vehicles turning round or reversing (reducing vehicle utilization and increasing costs).
- Passengers wishing to travel across the city or town centre will have to change vehicles or walk for part of their journeys.

On the other hand, there are certain advantages to terminating a route in a city or town centre:

- Schedules are less likely to be disrupted by congestion (since there can be provision for recovery time in the city center).
- Convenient interchange between routes may be provided at a common terminal.
- Fare structures are less complex.

In most cases, the advantages of operating routes across a city or town centre outweigh the disadvantages, and each case must be assessed on its own merits.

== See also ==
- Circle route
- Transport hub
