= R25 (London) =

Proposed orbital railway in London, England

R25 is a proposed railway orbital around the Zone 3 area of London, England. First proposed in the Mayor of London's £1.3 trillion London Infrastructure 2050 plan, the line would have used some existing Network Rail and London Overground lines, linked by stretches of new railway.

== History ==
The R25 nickname alludes to London's M25 orbital motorway. The idea featured in news media when the Mayor of London, Boris Johnson, visited Barking Riverside, a large development held up by lack of rail access in 2014. The idea of extending the Gospel Oak to Barking line trains onto the Tilbury Loop line to serve a station near Barking Riverside had already gained some ground having been mentioned in the 2013 budget statement, but news reports showed a Tube map-like extract with a new line crossing the River Thames to serve Abbey Wood.

There have also been calls to extend the line further south across the river to Thamesmead and Abbey Wood. In August 2017, the Government granted permission for the extension of the Gospel Oak to Barking line and a provision for a stop at Renwick Road (if needed) and states that a further extension across the Thames should be provisioned. The new station at Barking Riverside opened on 18 July 2022, but any further extension across the river was dropped in favour of extending the Docklands Light Railway from Gallions Reach.

== See also ==
- Orbital railways in London
- West London Orbital
