= Cricklewood railway station =

National Rail station in London, England

Cricklewood
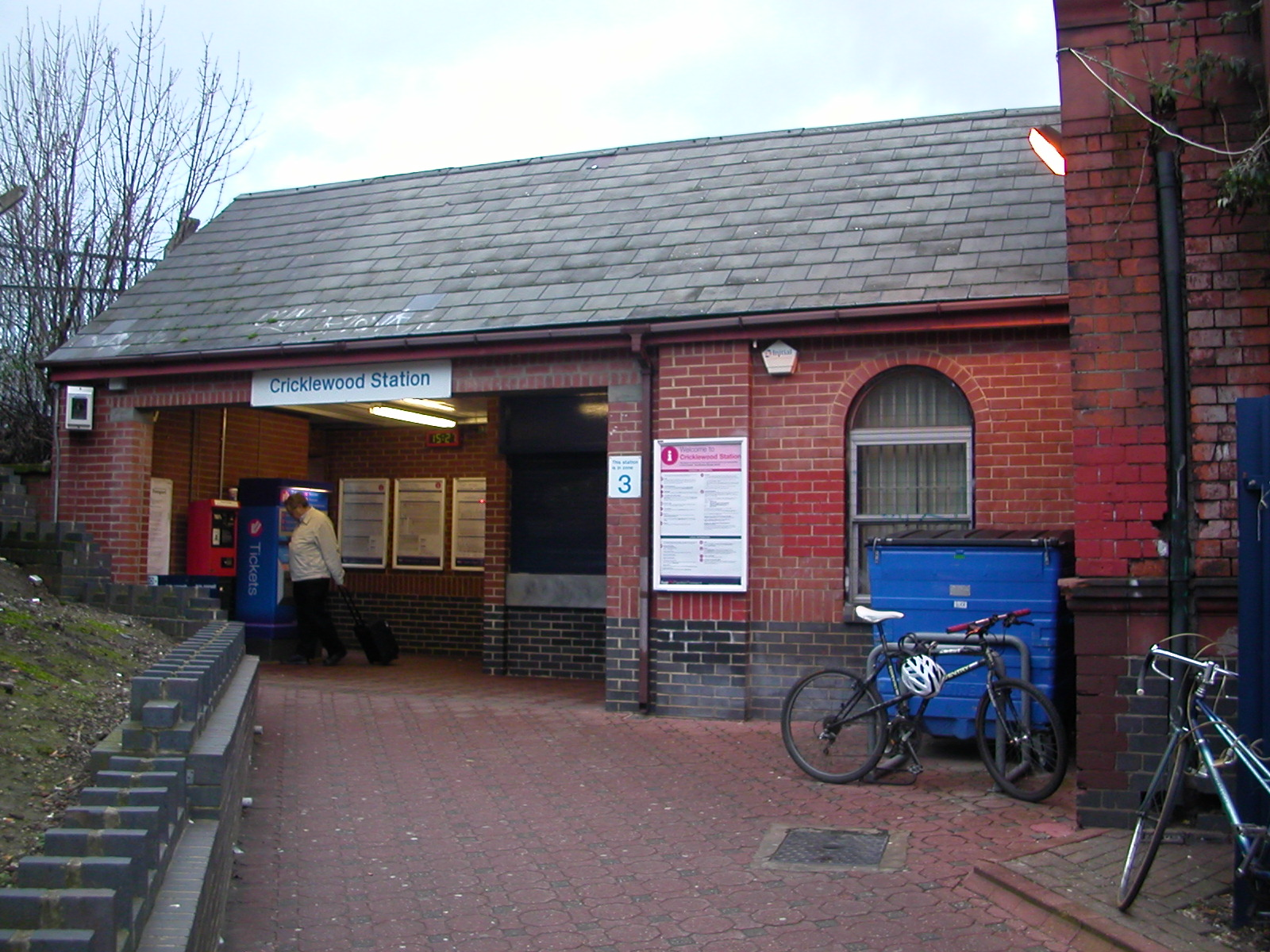
- Exterior of main station building at Cricklewood
- Interactive map of Cricklewood

General information
- Location: Cricklewood
- Local authority: London Borough of Barnet
- Managed by: Thameslink
- Station code: CRI
- DfT category: E
- Number of platforms: 4
- Fare zone: 3

National Rail annual entry and exit
- 2020–21: ▼0.349 million
- 2021–22: ▲0.612 million
- 2022–23: ▲0.821 million
- 2023–24: ▲0.872 million
- 2024–25: ▼0.859 million

Key dates
- 2 May 1870: Opened

Other information
- External links: Departures; Facilities
- Coordinates: 51.5586°N 0.2129°W

Cricklewood railway station is on the Midland Main Line in England, serving the town of Cricklewood in the London Borough of Barnet, north London. It is 5 miles 9 chains (8.2 km) down the line from St Pancras and is situated between West Hampstead Thameslink to the south and Brent Cross West to the north. Its three-letter station code is CRI.

It is served by Thameslink services on the cross-London Thameslink route. It is in London fare zone 3.

== History ==
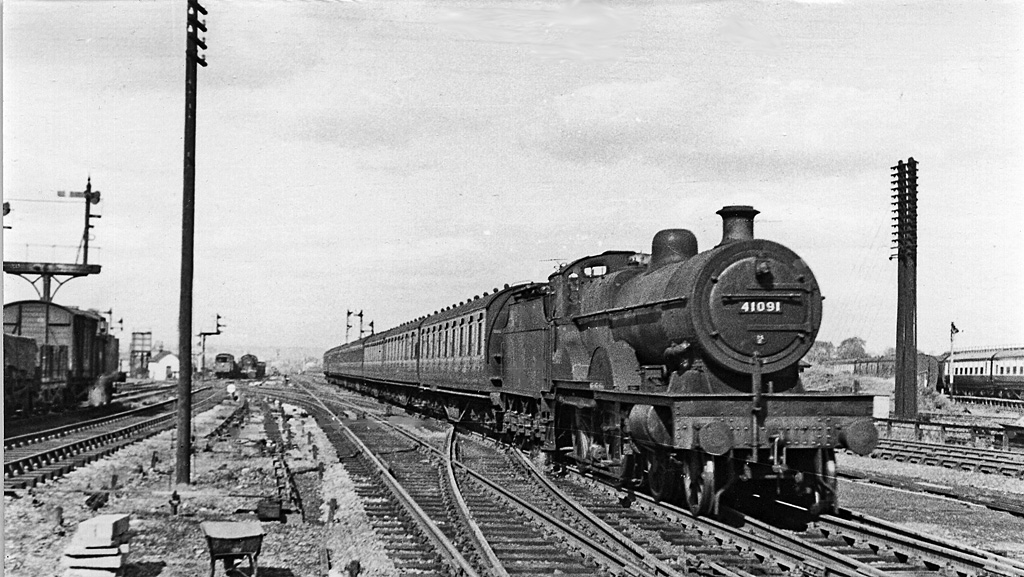
Up stopping train in 1950

It was opened on 2 May 1870 as Childs Hill and Cricklewood nearly 2 years after the Midland Railway had built its extension (now called the Midland Main Line) to St. Pancras. The station acquired its present name in 1903.

To the north of the station, a motive power depot was built with a large roundhouse in 1882, with a second in 1893. With this was built a large marshalling yard and, in later years, LMS Garratts would be seen with their massive trains of coal from Toton in the Nottinghamshire and Derbyshire coalfields. A loop line, no longer in existence, was built heading north on the western side of the railway yard, then turning east underneath the main line at the viaduct over the River Brent (and also now the North Circular Road), then south on the eastern side. This obviously allowed trains to reverse direction, but also conveniently joined the railway yards on the two sides of the main lines.

Between 1899 and 1926, a number of proposals were put forward to build an underground railway along the Edgware Road from Central London to Cricklewood via Kilburn, and envisaged the construction of a Tube station at Cricklewood. None of the schemes succeeded and the line was never built.

A mural bearing the inscription QUEEN OF THE AIR (which was a nickname the British press gave Amy Johnson) was painted in Cricklewood station to commemorate the hundred-year anniversary of women getting the right to vote in the United Kingdom.

In 2014, the pedestrian subway of Cricklewood station was refurbished with renewed cladding, lighting and a repaired floor, and disabled access was improved at the ticket office window.

== Facilities ==
This station has 4 platforms, numbered from 1 (easternmost) to 4 (westernmost). Platforms 1 and 2 are on the southbound and northbound slow lines, where all regular services calling at the station use. Platforms 3 and 4 are on the southbound and northbound fast lines, which are normally fenced off while fast trains pass through this station non-stop, and only to be used when the slow lines are out of use.

== Services ==
All services at Cricklewood are operated by Thameslink using Class 700 EMUs.

The typical off-peak service in trains per hour is:

- 4 tph to St Albans City
- 4 tph to Sutton (2 of these run via Mitcham Junction and 2 run via Wimbledon)

During the peak hours, the station is served by additional services to and from Luton, Orpington and Rainham, as well as some late evening services to and from Bedford.

The station is also served by a night service between Bedford and Three Bridges on Sunday to Friday nights.

Preceding station	National Rail	Following station
Brent Cross West	Thameslink Thameslink	West Hampstead Thameslink
	Disused railways	
Welsh Harp Line open, station closed	Midland Railway Midland Main Line	West Hampstead Line and station open
Dudding Hill Line open (freight only), station closed	Midland Railway Dudding Hill Line	West Hampstead Line and station open

== Development ==
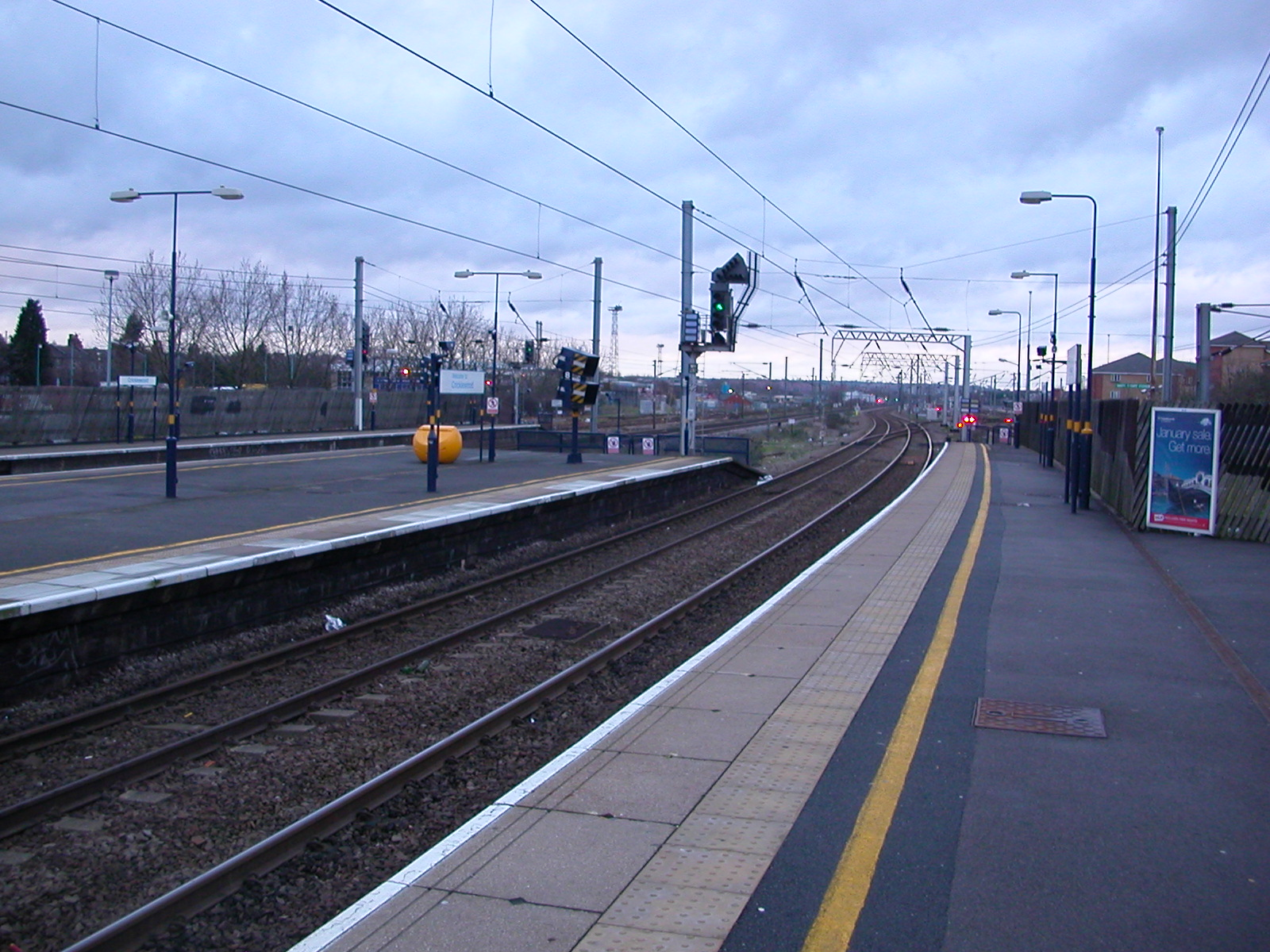
Northbound view from Platform 1 of the four platforms. Two additional freight tracks are on the extreme left

=== Re-opening of Dudding Hill Line to passenger services ===
Various schemes have been proposed for improved railway connections through Cricklewood. In early 2008, the London Group of the Campaign for Better Transport pressure group published a proposal for a light rail system in West London called the North and West London Light railway (NWLLR), which would have made use of the Dudding Hill freight line freight corridor that runs through Cricklewood station. The NWLLR scheme did not progress beyond the proposal stage.

The proposal to re-open the Dudding Hill Line to passenger services was revived in 2017 when the London Assembly and Transport for London published a plan to extend the London Overground network through Cricklewood. The scheme, known as the West London Orbital envisages running services from West Hampstead Thameslink and Hendon to Hounslow via Cricklewood and the planned Old Oak Common Lane station. The plans are currently at public consultation stage with TfL.

=== Brent Cross West development ===
Plans to build Brent Cross West station 1.5 kilometres (0.93 mi) to the north of Cricklewood were approved by national and London government in March 2014. The new station opened in December 2023 and, unlike Cricklewood, Brent Cross West is able to accommodate the new 12-carriage trains. There had been rumours that Cricklewood station would close when the new station opened but these were refuted by the Brent Cross Cricklewood development company. The developers announced funding for further upgrade work at Cricklewood station in 2010, including the installation of lifts to provide step-free access to all platforms.

== Connections ==
London Buses routes 189, 226, 245, 260, 460 and C11 serve the station.

== Cricklewood TMD and sidings ==
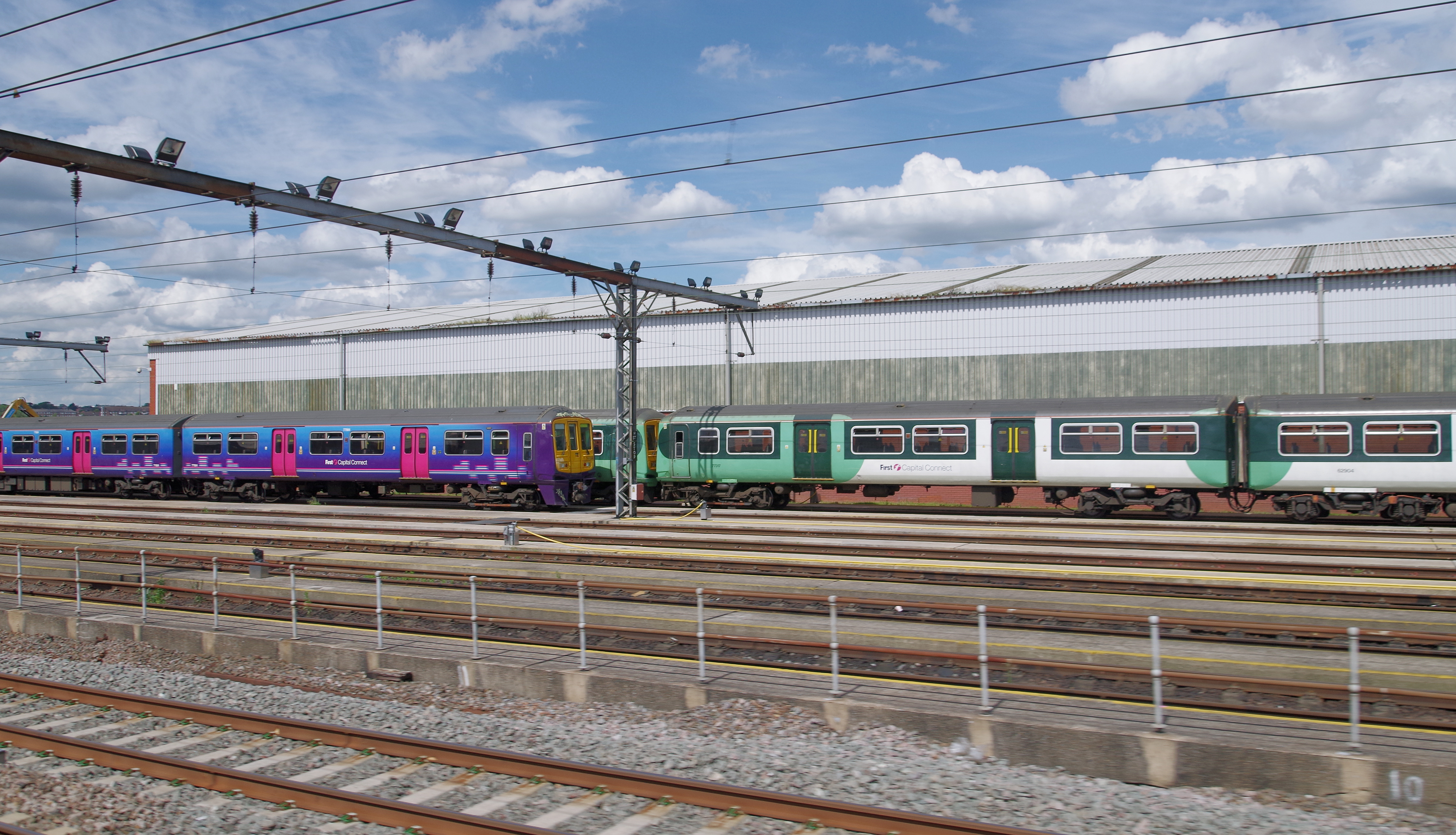
Cricklewood TMD, showing Class 319s of former-operator First Capital Connect

The original Cricklewood railway engine servicing depot was built by the Midland Railway just to the north west of curve of the junction with the Dudding Hill Line. It was built as and remains as the first major servicing depot for trains terminating in London, and for servicing the local regional commuter trains on the Midland Main Line. Part rebuilt by British Railways, it was closed to steam in December 1964.

To the eastern side of the mainline, the Midland Railway had originally built a goods yard, which developed into a sizeable freight facility under British Railways, for collating and distributing goods around London. Resultantly, as the confines of the original depot with the introduction of electrification meant it could no longer be used, a new depot was built to the north east of the mainline, located directly north of the sidings and above the northern junction with the Dudding Hill Line.

Today, the depot serves as the London base for East Midlands Railway, providing stabling and operational servicing for its British Rail Class 222 and class 180. It also formerly served as a regional depot for First Capital Connect, until it was superseded by Govia Thameslink Railway in September 2014, who use other newly built facilities in other locations. The sidings located to its south still provide freight services, including being the starting point for one of the daily BinLiner domestic waste trains that terminate at the Calvert Landfill site, operated by the Waste Recycling Group for the Department of the Environment.
