= Circle Line =

Circle Line or Circular line is the name of many loop lines and similar orbital services in public transportation. It can refer to:

== Railways ==
=== Asia ===
==== Azerbaijan ====
- Baku suburban railway
- Baku Metro (partly in operation)

==== Bangladesh ====
- Chittagong Circular Railway

==== China ====
- Line 2 (Beijing Subway)
- Line 10 (Beijing Subway)
- Line 4 (Shanghai Metro)
- Line 7 (Chengdu Metro)
- Line 5 (Zhengzhou Metro)
- Loop line (Chongqing Rail Transit)
- Line 11 (Guangzhou Metro)
- Line 8 (Xi'an Metro)
- Line 3 (Harbin Metro)
- Line 12 (Wuhan Metro) (partly in operation)
- Guiyang railway loop line

==== Hong Kong ====
- MTR Light Rail Routes 705 and 706, also known as Tin Shui Wai Circular.

==== India ====
- Delhi Ring Railway
- Kolkata Circular Railway
- Pink Line (Delhi Metro) (partly in operation)

==== Indonesia ====
- Cikarang Line, in Jakarta

==== Japan ====
- Meijō Line, in Nagoya
- Osaka Loop Line, in Osaka
- Sapporo Streetcar, in Sapporo
- Toei Ōedo Line, in Tokyo
- Toyama City Tram Line Route 3, in Toyama
- Yamanote Line, in Tokyo

==== Malaysia ====
- Circle Line (Kuala Lumpur)

==== Myanmar ====
- Yangon Circular Railway

==== Pakistan ====
- Karachi Circular Railway

==== Singapore ====
- Circle Line (Singapore)

==== South Korea ====
- Seoul Subway Line 2

==== Taiwan ====
- Circular light rail, in Kaohsiung
- Circular line (Taipei metropolitan area)

==== Thailand ====
- MRT Blue Line, in Bangkok

=== Europe ===
==== Denmark ====
- M3 (Copenhagen Metro), also known as the City Circle Line, a Copenhagen Metro line
- Ringbanen, a Copenhagen S-train line

==== Finland ====
- Ring Rail Line, in Vantaa (Greater Helsinki)

==== France ====
- Paris Metro Line 15, currently under construction

==== Germany ====
- Berlin Ringbahn
- U3 (Hamburg U-Bahn)

==== Italy ====
- Line 1 (Naples Metro) (partly in operation)

==== Norway ====
- Ring Line (Oslo)

==== Poland ====
- Łódz Circular line, a section of the Łódź Agglomeration Railway commuter rail service, Łódz, Poland

==== Portugal ====
- Lisbon Metro Green Line (partly in operation)

==== Russia ====
- Bolshaya Koltsevaya line, the Big Circle line of Moscow Metro (Line 11)
- Koltsevaya line, the Circle line of Moscow Metro (Line 5)
- Moscow Central Circle, central circle line of Moscow Metro (Line 14)

==== Spain ====
- Line 6 (Madrid Metro)
- Line 12 (Madrid Metro)

==== Turkey ====
- M11 (Istanbul Metro) (partly in operation)

==== United Kingdom ====
- Circle line (London Underground), in London
- Cathcart Circle Lines, in Glasgow
- Fife Circle Line, in Edinburgh and Fife
- Glasgow Subway, in Glasgow

=== North America ===
==== United States ====
- Chicago 'L' Circle Line proposed but unbuilt

=== Oceania ===
==== Australia ====
- City Circle, in Sydney
- City Circle free tram, in Melbourne
- City Circle trains were originally a feature of the City Loop in Melbourne
- Inner Circle railway line, in Melbourne
- Outer Circle railway line, in Melbourne

== Waterways ==
United States

- Circle Line Downtown, in New York City
- Circle Line Sightseeing Cruises, in New York City

== Others ==
- Circle Line (film), Singaporean film

== See also ==
- Category:Railway loop lines
- Circle route
- Ring road or beltway, the circumferential motorway.
- List of ring roads
