= Circle route =

Type of route in a public transport system

A circle route (also circumference, loop, ring route, ring line or orbital line) is a public transport route that follows a path approximating a circle or other closed curve.

Line 2 of the Seoul Metropolitan Subway

== Definition ==
The expression "circle route" may refer in particular to:

- a route orbiting a central point, commonly the central business district (CBD) in a city or large town
- a route running in approximately a circular path from a point near the centre of a city or town out to a peripheral point and back again
- a feeder route running from an interchange station around a neighbourhood or suburb in approximately a circle

== Typical characteristics ==
Typically, a circle route will connect at several locations with one or more cross-city routes or radial routes offering services in a straighter line into or out of a city or town centre. When a circle route orbits a central business district in a large arc, it will often provide transverse (or lateral) links between suburbs or satellites, either on its own or in combination with other routes, such as Seoul Subway Line 2, the busiest line in the Seoul Metropolitan Subway network. Such connections assist travellers by reducing travel times, avoiding congested centres, and sometimes reducing the number of transfers. Similar benefits may also be achieved by half-circle routes or peripheral cross-city routes, such as Osaka Higashi Line, Musashino Line and Copenhagen S-Train Line F.

Circle routes do have their operational disadvantages. They can be susceptible to delays and bunching, as without a terminus for trains to layover between services, or significant padding in schedules, there is no way for late trains to recover lost time. This issue is particularly pronounced when circle routes share their corridor with other traffic, such as the InnerLink (and OuterLink buses pre-2024) in Auckland, or the London Underground's Circle Line prior to 2009; as any sort of delay on the circle route affects other services sharing the same tracks/bus lanes.

Successful circle routes, such as Beijing Subway Line 10, Koltsevaya line in Moscow, and Pink Line in Delhi, tend to be isolated lines that do not share corridors with other services; or, if they do, have their own dedicated tracks and platforms with any junctions being grade-separated.

== Notable circle routes ==
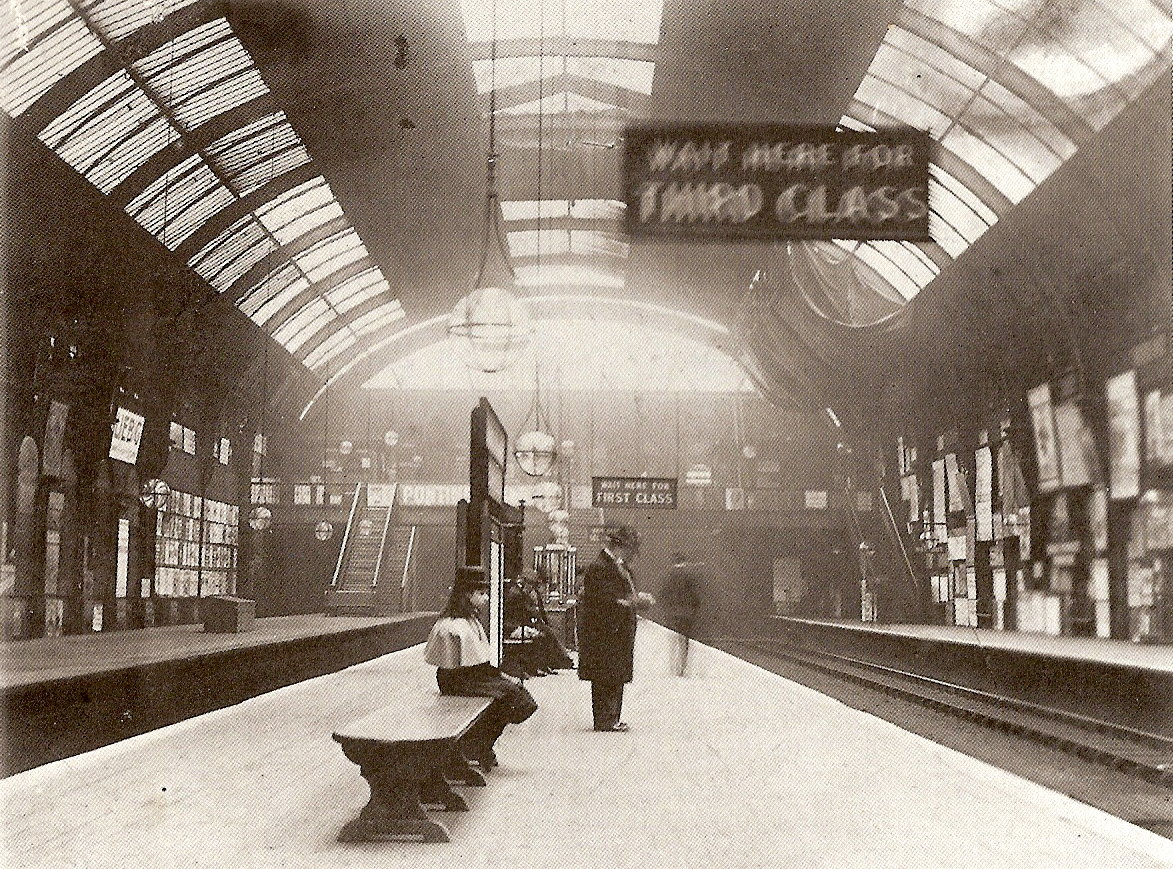
High Street Kensington station on the Inner Circle line in London, the world's first circle line.

The oldest circular rapid transit line was London's Inner Circle, today the Circle line of the London Underground, which was completed in 1884 and operated by two separate companies. The route chosen forms the general border of what is today Central London. This was followed by the Glasgow Subway which opened in 1896 and has remained unchanged to this day. In Moscow Metro, a railway from 1908 was reopened as a passenger line in 2016. More recently, the M3 line of Copenhagen Metro was opened in 2019, connecting the city centre to the northern and eastern suburbs. In 2026, the final extension of Delhi Metro's Pink Line was inaugurated, creating India's first circular metro line. In some cities such as Paris, where lines 2 and 6 encircle the city, multiple services together can effectively form a circular route.

Circle routes can also be found in many commuter rail networks, namely in Sydney and Melbourne, with Sydney's City Circle being built in 1926 and Melbourne's City Loop in 1981. Further examples are the Osaka Loop Line for the JR West Urban Network (serving the Kyoto-Osaka-Kobe conurbation) and the Yamanote Line for the JR East Greater Tokyo network in Japan and the S-Bahn lines S41 and S42 in Berlin's Ringbahn in Germany.

== See also ==
- Ring road, a road with a circular route
- Orbital railways in London
- Circle Line
