= West London Business =

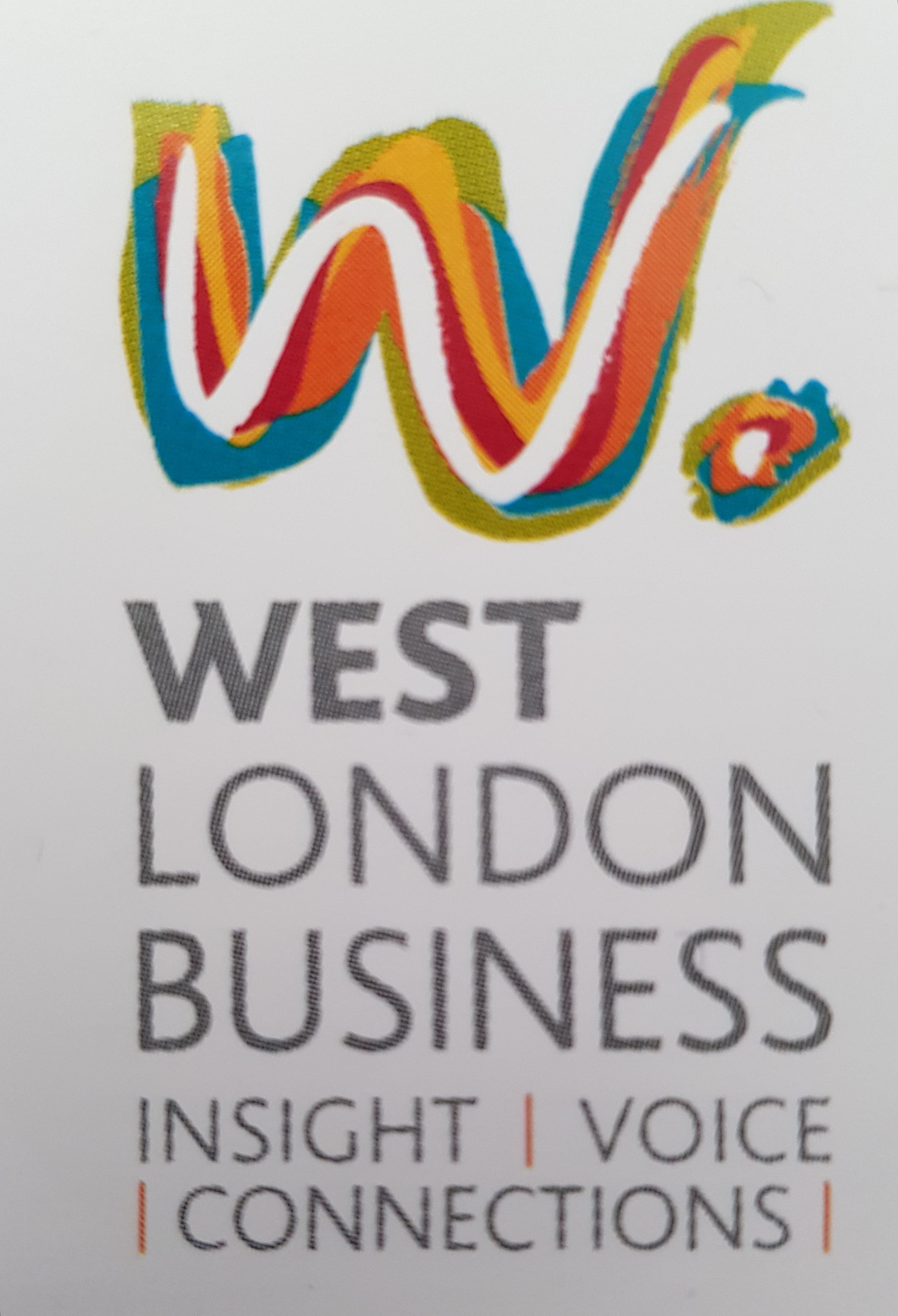
- Company type: Non-profit organisation
- Headquarters: London, W4
- Area served: West London
- Key people: Andrew Dakers (CEO)
- Website: www.westlondon.com

West London Business (WLB) is a UK non-profit business leadership forum, founded in 1994. It represents businesses and enterprises with a presence in the seven 'West London Alliance' boroughs: Barnet, Brent, Ealing, Hammersmith & Fulham, Harrow, Hillingdon, and Hounslow.

The boroughs have a combined population of 2.1 million people, 1.1 million economically active people and 109,000 active businesses.

Now 3 decades on, WLB seeks to represent the interests of 100,000+ businesses, from small to multinational, located in West London, which contribute an estimated (in 2016) £50 billion (GVA) to the economy of the United Kingdom.

The organisation's mission is to ensure West London stays the best place to do business.

== Membership ==
WLB has around 200 members, including major corporates and multinationals such as PwC, the Fuller's Brewery, Heathrow Airport, HSBC and Segro, through to SMEs, as well as Further Education and Higher Education institutions. The organisation claims the results is a forum for promotion and networking in West London.

In joining WLB members commit to work together to raise West London’s global economic competitiveness, whilst pursuing social and environmental sustainability.

== Activities ==
West London Business is active in:

- providing members with knowledge of London-wide and local political and economic developments
- lobbying to influence public policy decisions that affect the local business environment.
- promoting economic development, entrepreneurial activity and innovation,
- supporting growth sectors such as pharmaceuticals, food, information technology, logistics, creative industries and tourism.

Under CEO Andrew Dakers they developed more services and partnerships including:

- Park Royal Business Group – WLB provides this local business group's secretariat and legal structure.
- Spark! Kick starting careers – WLB supports this education-business charity.
- Golden Mile Transport. Group – WLB supports the group.
- Cross Party Group for West London – WLB works in partnership with Fuller, Smith & Turner Plc to provide the secretariat for the group.
- West London Export Club – WLB works in partnership with Hounslow Chamber of Commerce to provide the secretariat for the club.
- West London Alliance (the public body incorporating the councils that cover Northwest London) which includes Hounslow, Ealing, Brent, Harrow, Hillingdon, Barnet and Hammersmith & Fulham.

WLB promotes the West London Orbital underground railway scheme. WLB and partners are working on the possibility of converting freight lines into passenger services. This would include linking Brentford to Barnet via the Dudding Hill line.

== History ==
The organisation emerged from the merger of West London Inward and West London Chamber of Commerce in the early 2000s. Much of the energy from Business in the Community's West London Leadership team folded into WLB in the early 2000s.

Recent chief executives:

- Kate Ashton (2003-5)
- Frank Wingate (2005–15)
- Andrew Dakers (2015-)

West London Business has in the past offered:

- free support for business start-up and micro companies through the 'Business London West Consortium'
- commercial consultancy services, using specialist partner consultants where appropriate
- promoting inward investment and business growth services with funding support from the London Development Agency.
