= United States v. Microsoft Corp. (disambiguation) =

United States v. Microsoft Corp. was a 2001 U.S. antitrust law case.

United States v. Microsoft Corp. may also refer to:

- Microsoft Corp. v. United States, a data privacy case that was appealed to the U.S. Supreme Court as United States v. Microsoft Corp. during the 2017–2018 term

== See also ==
- Microsoft v. United States (2016)
- FTC v. Microsoft (2022) related to Acquisition of Activision Blizzard by Microsoft
