= Microsoft =

American multinational technology conglomerate

Coordinates: 47°38′33″N 122°07′56″W

Microsoft Corporation
- Microsoft logo used since 2012

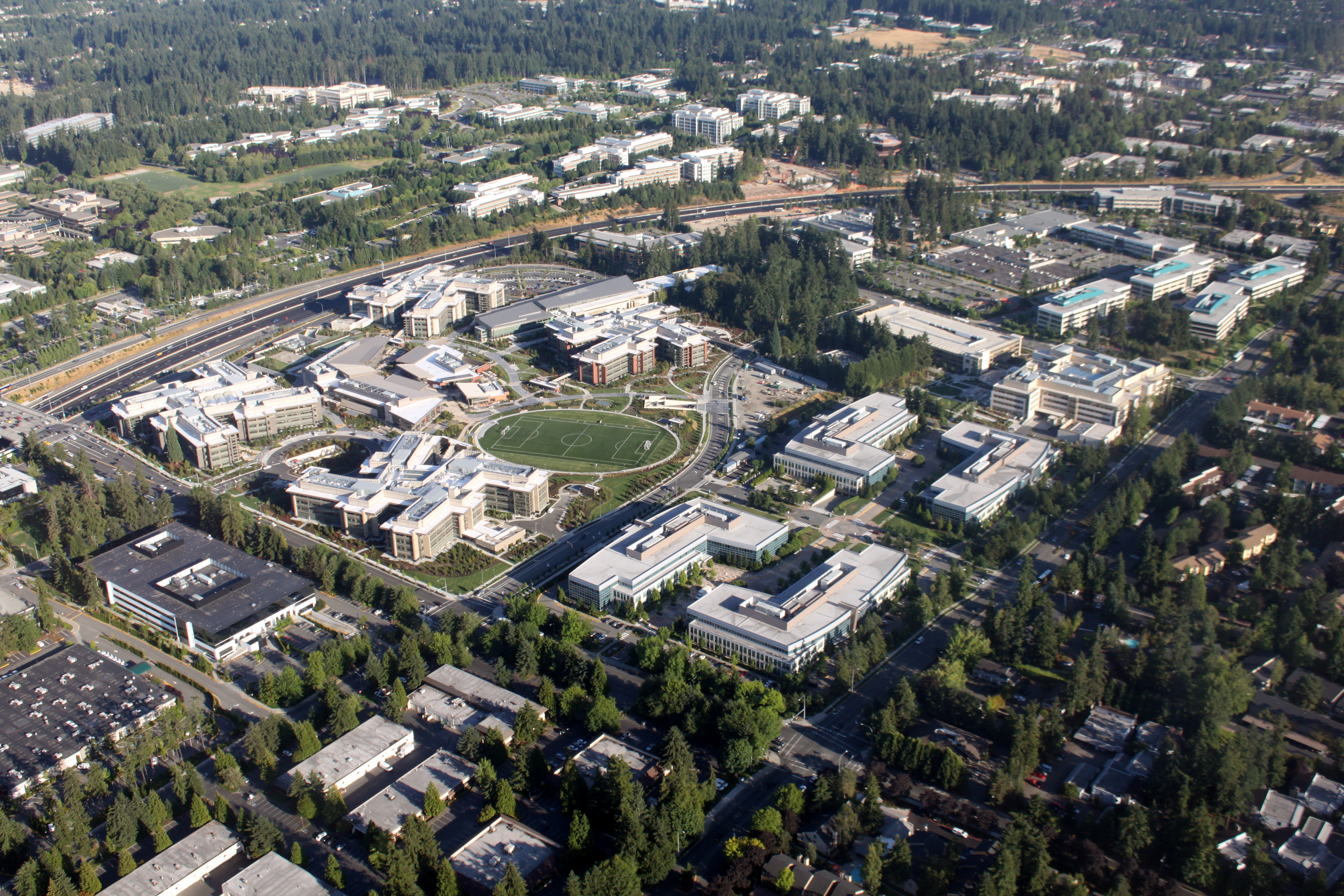
- Microsoft campus, the company's headquarters, in Redmond, Washington
- Type: Public
- Traded as: Nasdaq: MSFT; Nasdaq-100 component; DJIA component; S&P 100 component; S&P 500 component
- ISIN: US5949181045
- Industry: Information technology
- Predecessor: Traf-O-Data
- Founded: April 4, 1975; 51 years ago in Albuquerque, New Mexico, U.S.
- Founders: Bill Gates; Paul Allen
- Headquarters: Microsoft campus, Redmond, Washington, U.S.
- Area served: Worldwide
- Key people: Satya Nadella (chairman and CEO); Brad Smith (vice chairman and president); Bill Gates (technical adviser); Amy Hood (CFO)
- Products: Software development; Computer hardware; Artificial intelligence; Consumer electronics; Social networking service; Cloud computing; Video games; Corporate venture capital
- Brands: Windows; Microsoft 365; Teams; Visual Studio; Azure; Xbox; Dynamics; Surface
- Services: Edge; Azure; Bing; LinkedIn; Viva Engage; Microsoft 365; OneDrive; Dynamics 365; Outlook; GitHub; Microsoft Store; Windows Update; Xbox Game Pass; Xbox network
- Revenue: ▲US$331.8 billion (2026)
- Operating income: ▲US$155.2 billion (2026)
- Net income: ▲US$133.7 billion (2026)
- Total assets: ▲US$758.4 billion (2026)
- Total equity: ▲US$442.4 billion (2026)
- Number of employees: 223,000 (2026)
- Divisions: Xbox; Microsoft 365; Microsoft Research; Microsoft AI; Windows and Devices Group; Microsoft Cloud; Microsoft Security; Microsoft Industry; Microsoft Business Applications; Microsoft Developer
- Subsidiaries: GitHub; LinkedIn
- ASN: 8075
- Website: microsoft.com
- Footnotes; Financials as of June 30, 2025

Microsoft Corporation is an American multinational technology conglomerate headquartered in Redmond, Washington. The company became influential in the rise of personal computers through software like Windows and has since expanded into areas such as Internet services, cloud computing, artificial intelligence, and video gaming, among others. A Big Tech company, Microsoft is the largest software company by revenue, one of the most valuable public companies, and one of the most valuable brands globally.

Founded in 1975 by Bill Gates and Paul Allen to market BASIC interpreters for the Altair 8800, Microsoft rose to dominate the PC operating system market with MS-DOS in the mid-1980s, followed by Windows. The company's 1986 initial public offering and the subsequent rise in its share price created three billionaires and an estimated 12,000 millionaires among Microsoft employees. Since the 1990s, it has increasingly diversified its business. Steve Ballmer replaced Gates as CEO in 2000. He oversaw the then-largest of Microsoft's corporate acquisitions in Skype Technologies in 2011, an increased focus on hardware that led to its first in-house PC line—the Surface—in 2012, and the formation of Microsoft Mobile through Nokia. Since Satya Nadella became CEO in 2014, the company has changed focus towards cloud computing and acquired LinkedIn in 2016. Under his direction, the company has expanded its video gaming business to support the Xbox brand, establishing the Microsoft Gaming division in 2022 and acquiring Activision Blizzard in 2023.

Microsoft has been dominant in the IBM PC–compatible operating system and office software suite markets since the 1990s. Its best-known software products are the Windows line of operating systems and the Microsoft Office and Microsoft 365 suite of productivity applications, which most notably include the Word word processor, Excel spreadsheet editor, and PowerPoint presentation program. Its flagship hardware products are the Surface lineup of PCs and the Xbox brand of video game consoles, which includes the Xbox network. The company also offers online services such as Bing web search, the MSN web portal, the Outlook.com (Hotmail) email service, and the Microsoft Store. In the enterprise and development fields, Microsoft most notably provides the Azure cloud computing platform, Microsoft SQL Server database software, and Visual Studio.

Microsoft became the third publicly traded U.S. company to be valued at over $1 trillion in April 2019. It has been criticized for monopolistic practices, and the company's software received criticism for problems with ease of use, robustness, and security. Microsoft has also been criticized for its role in providing services to Israel during the Gaza war.

== History ==
=== 1972–1985: Founding ===
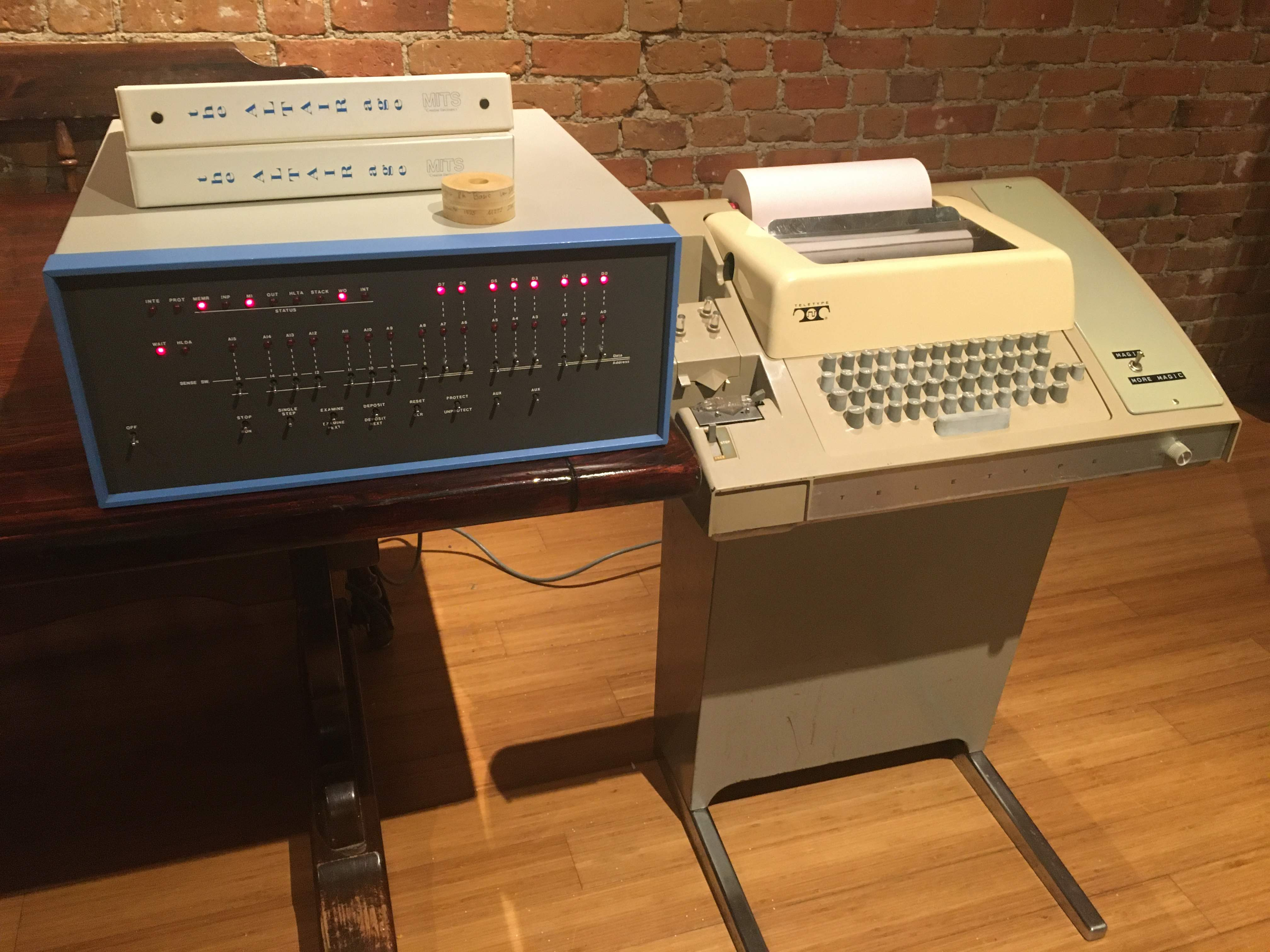
An Altair 8800 computer (left) with the popular Model 33 ASR Teletype as terminal, paper tape reader, and paper tape punch

Paul Allen and Bill Gates on October 19, 1981, after signing a pivotal contract with IBM

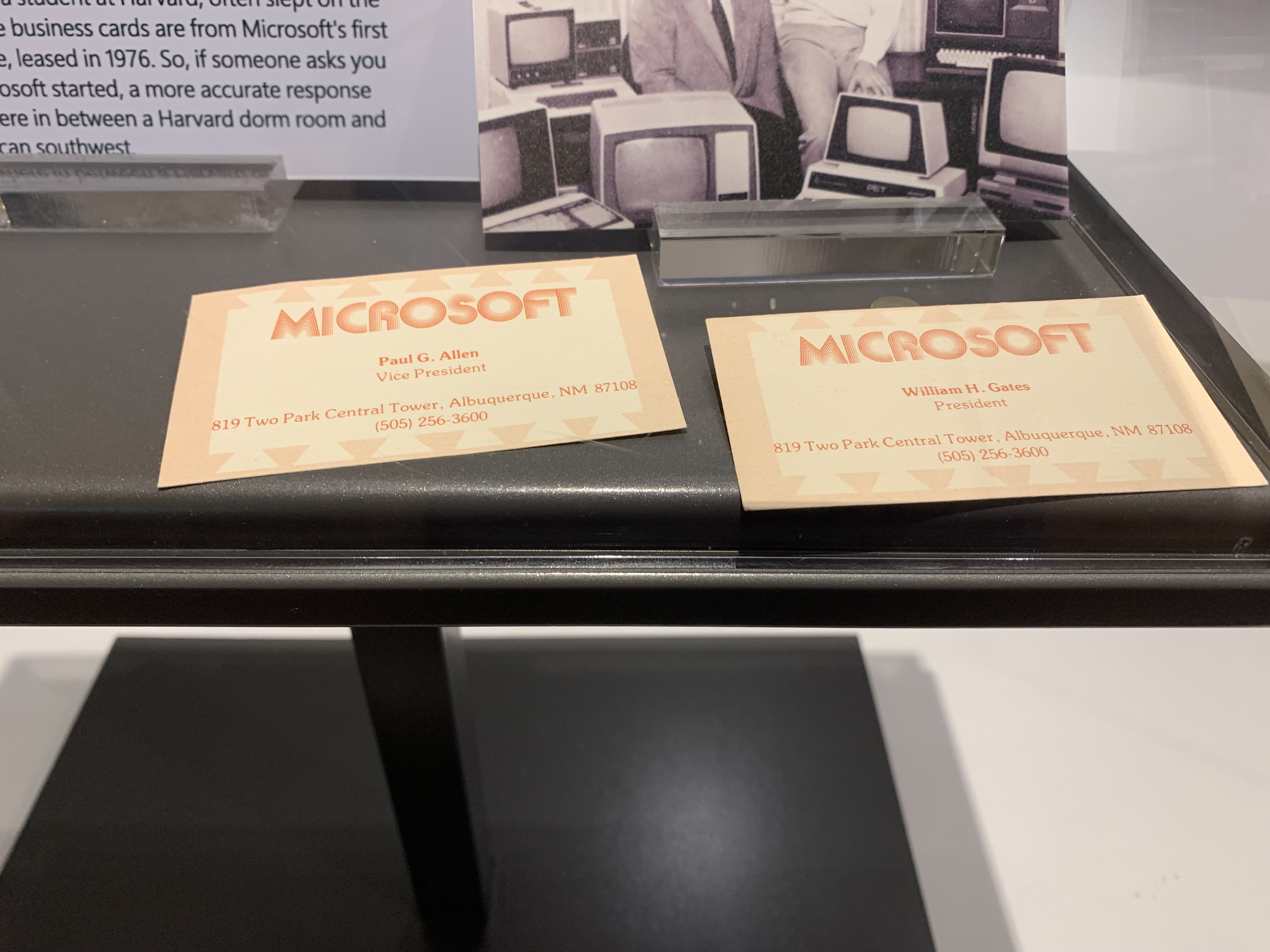
Bill Gates and Paul Allen's Original Business Cards located in the Microsoft Visitor Center

Childhood friends Bill Gates and Paul Allen sought to make a business using their skills in computer programming. In 1972, they founded Traf-O-Data, which sold a rudimentary computer to track and analyze automobile traffic data.

The January 1975 issue of Popular Electronics featured Micro Instrumentation and Telemetry Systems's (MITS) Altair 8800 microcomputer, which inspired Allen to suggest that they could program a BASIC interpreter for the device. Gates called MITS and claimed that he had a working interpreter, and MITS requested a demonstration. Allen worked on a simulator for the Altair while Gates developed the interpreter, and it worked flawlessly when they demonstrated it to MITS in March 1975 in Albuquerque, New Mexico. MITS agreed to distribute it, marketing it as Altair BASIC. Gates and Allen established Microsoft on April 4, 1975, with Gates as CEO, and Allen suggested the name "Micro-Soft", short for micro-computer software. In August 1977, the company formed an agreement with ASCII Magazine in Japan, resulting in its first international office of ASCII Microsoft. Microsoft moved its headquarters to Bellevue, Washington, in January 1979.

Microsoft entered the operating system (OS) business in 1980 with its own version of Unix, licensed from AT&T Corporation a year before, called Xenix, but it was MS-DOS that solidified the company's dominance. IBM awarded a contract to Microsoft in November 1980 to provide a version of the CP/M OS to be used in the IBM Personal Computer (IBM PC). For this deal, Microsoft purchased a CP/M clone called 86-DOS from Seattle Computer Products which it branded as MS-DOS, although IBM rebranded it to IBM PC DOS. Microsoft retained ownership of MS-DOS following the release of the IBM PC in August 1981. IBM had copyrighted the IBM PC BIOS, so other companies had to reverse engineer it for non-IBM hardware to run as IBM PC compatibles, but no such restriction applied to the operating systems. The company expanded into new markets with the release of the Microsoft Mouse in 1983, as well as with a publishing division named Microsoft Press. Paul Allen resigned from Microsoft in 1983 after developing Hodgkin's lymphoma.

=== 1985–1994: Windows and Office ===
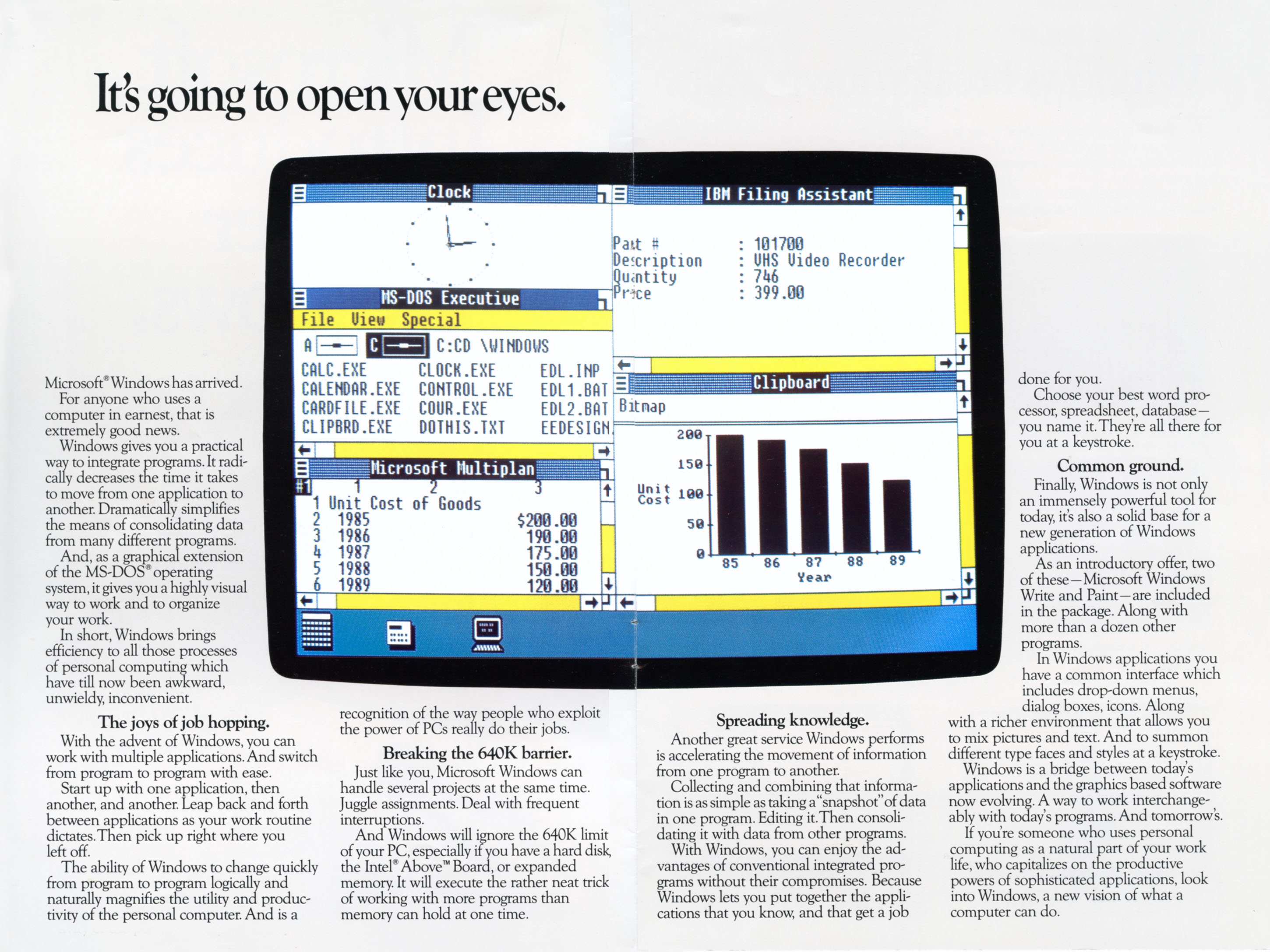
Windows 1.0 was released on November 20, 1985, as the first version of the Windows line.

Microsoft released Windows 1.0 on November 20, 1985, as a graphical extension for MS-DOS, despite having begun jointly developing OS/2 with IBM that August. Microsoft moved its headquarters from Bellevue to Redmond, Washington, on February 26, 1986, and went public with an initial public offering (IPO) at the NASDAQ exchange on March 13, with the resulting rise in stock making an estimated four billionaires and 12,000 millionaires from Microsoft employees. Microsoft released its version of OS/2 to original equipment manufacturers (OEMs) on April 2, 1987. In 1990, the Federal Trade Commission examined Microsoft for possible collusion due to the partnership with IBM, marking the beginning of more than a decade of legal clashes with the government. Meanwhile, the company was at work on Microsoft Windows NT, which was heavily based on its copy of the OS/2 code. It shipped on July 21, 1993, with a new modular kernel and the 32-bit Win32 application programming interface (API), making it easier to port from 16-bit (MS-DOS-based) Windows. Microsoft informed IBM of Windows NT, and the OS/2 partnership deteriorated.

In 1990, Microsoft introduced the Microsoft Office suite which bundled separate applications such as Microsoft Word and Microsoft Excel. On May 22, Microsoft launched Windows 3.0, featuring streamlined user interface graphics and improved protected mode capability for the Intel 386 processor, and both Office and Windows became dominant in their respective areas.

On July 27, 1994, the Department of Justice's Antitrust Division filed a competitive impact statement stating that since 1988, Microsoft had increasingly induced OEMs to pay royalties under a per-processor license for microprocessors in their computers regardless of whether a Microsoft product was used.

=== 1995–2007: Foray into the Web, Windows 95, Windows XP, and Xbox ===
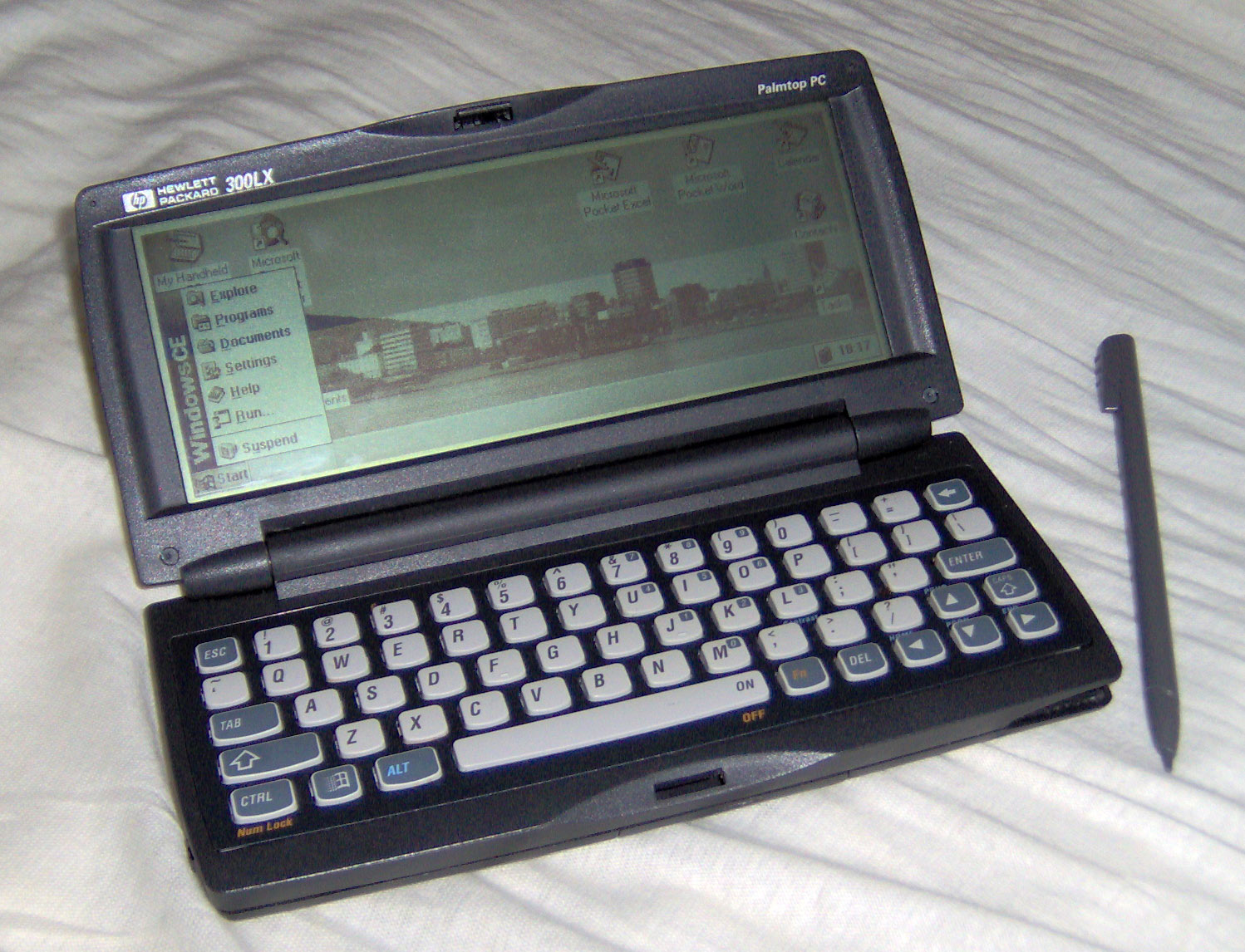
In 1996, Microsoft released Windows CE, a version of the operating system meant for personal digital assistants and other tiny computers, shown here on the HP 300LX.

Following Bill Gates's internal "Internet Tidal Wave memo" on May 26, 1995, Microsoft began to redefine its offerings and expand its product line into computer networking and the World Wide Web. With a few exceptions of new companies, like Netscape, Microsoft was the only major and established company that acted fast enough to be a part of the World Wide Web practically from the start. Other companies like Borland, WordPerfect, Novell, IBM and Lotus, being much slower to adapt to the new situation, would give Microsoft market dominance.

The company released Windows 95 on August 24, 1995, featuring pre-emptive multitasking, a completely new user interface with a novel start button, and 32-bit compatibility; similar to NT, it provided the Win32 API. Windows 95 came bundled with the online service MSN, which was intended to be a competitor to services such as CompuServe and AOL. The web browser Internet Explorer was not bundled with the retail release of Windows 95, and was instead included in the later Microsoft Plus! pack, as well as with OEM releases of Windows 95.

Backed by a high-profile marketing campaign and what The New York Times called "the splashiest, most frenzied, most expensive introduction of a computer product in the industry's history," Windows 95 quickly became a success. Branching out into new markets in 1996, Microsoft and General Electric's NBC unit created a new 24/7 cable news channel, MSNBC. Microsoft created Windows CE 1.0, a new OS designed for devices with low memory and other constraints, such as personal digital assistants. In October 1997, the Justice Department filed a motion in the Federal District Court, stating that Microsoft violated an agreement signed in 1994 and asked the court to stop the bundling of Internet Explorer with Windows.

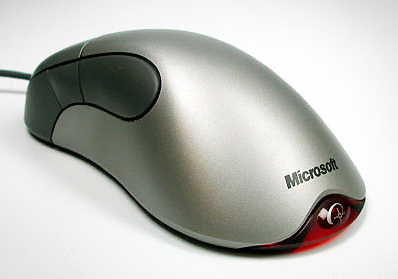
While primarily focused on software, Microsoft also produced a number of successful PC accessories, such as the IntelliMouse computer mice shown here.

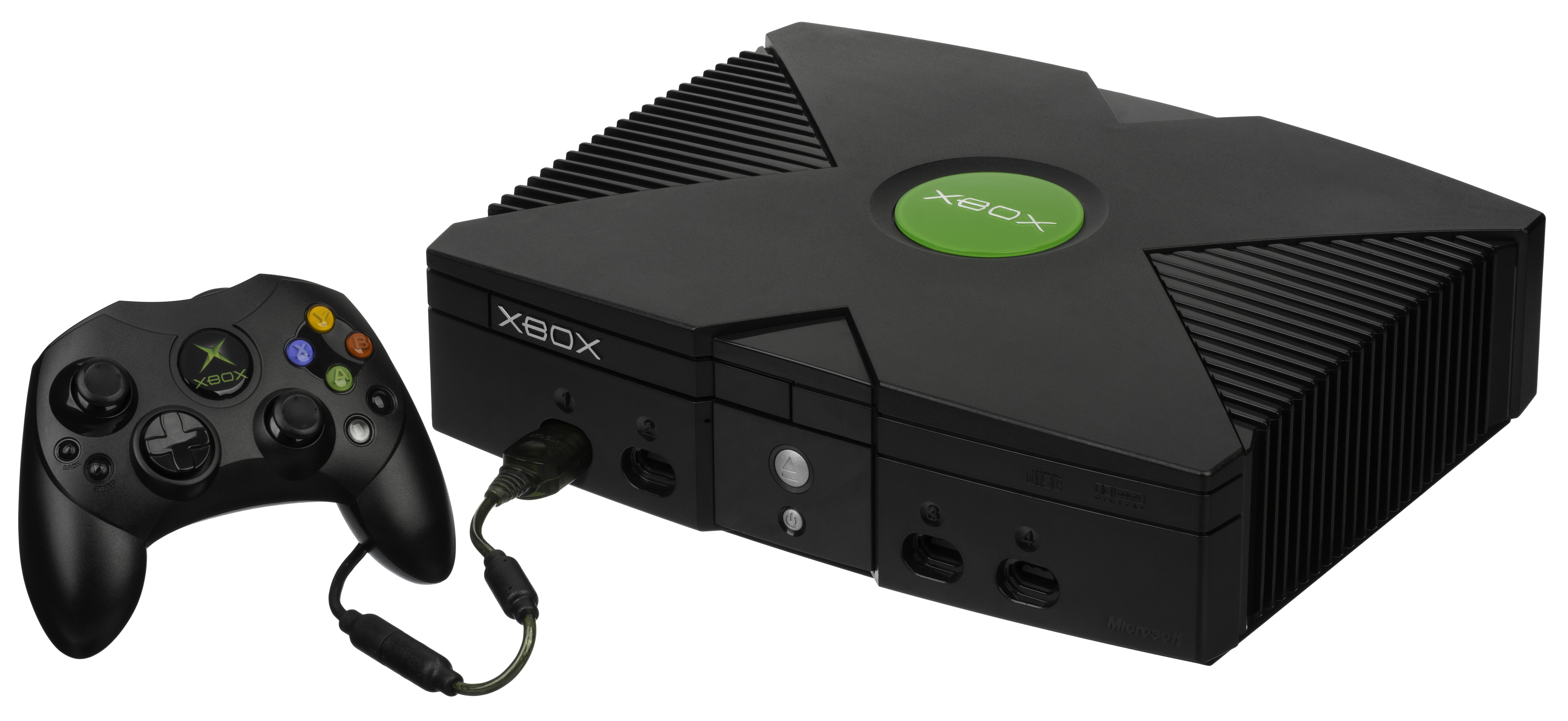
Microsoft released the first installment in the Xbox series of consoles in 2001. The Xbox, graphically powerful compared to its rivals, featured a standard PC's 733 MHz Intel Pentium III processor.

On January 13, 2000, Bill Gates handed over the CEO position to Steve Ballmer, an old college friend of Gates and employee of the company since 1980, while creating a new position for himself as Chief Software Architect. Under Ballmer's leadership, the company saw an increased focus on hardware products.

On October 25, 2001, Microsoft released Windows XP, unifying the mainstream and NT lines of OS under the NT codebase. The company released the Xbox later that year, entering the video game console market dominated by Sony and Nintendo. In March 2004 the European Union brought antitrust legal action against the company, citing it abused its dominance with the Windows OS, resulting in a judgment of €497 million ($613 million) and requiring Microsoft to produce new versions of Windows XP without Windows Media Player: Windows XP Home Edition N and Windows XP Professional N. In November 2005, the company's second and most successful video game console, the Xbox 360, was released.

Increasingly present in the hardware business following Xbox, Microsoft 2006 released the Zune series of digital media players, a successor of its previous software platform Portable Media Center.

=== 2007–2011: Microsoft Azure, Windows Vista, Windows 7, and Microsoft Stores ===
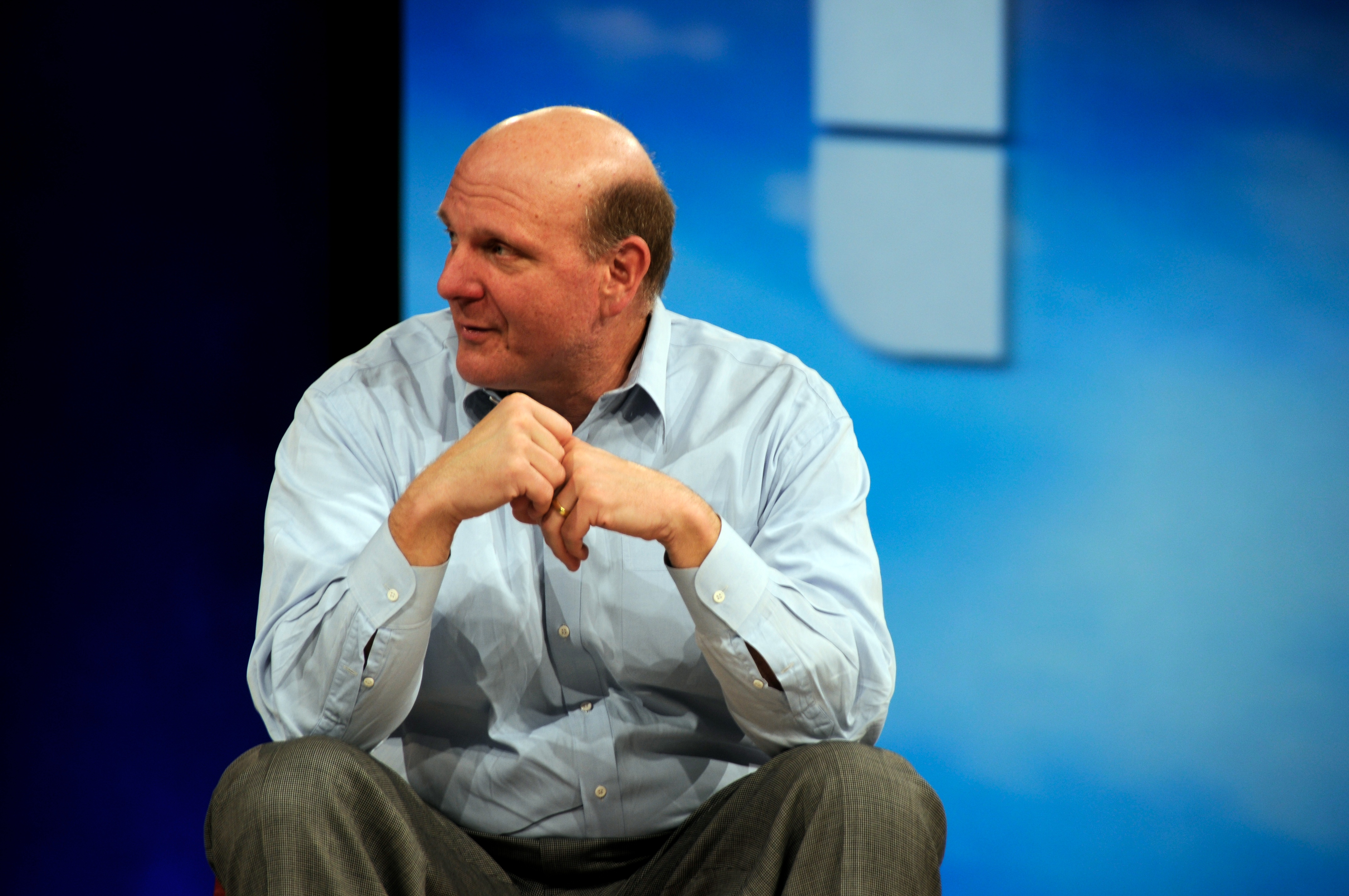
CEO Steve Ballmer at the MIX event in 2008. In an interview about his management style in 2005, he mentioned that his first priority was to get the people he delegates to in order. Ballmer also emphasized the need to continue pursuing new technologies even if initial attempts fail, citing the original attempts with Windows as an example.

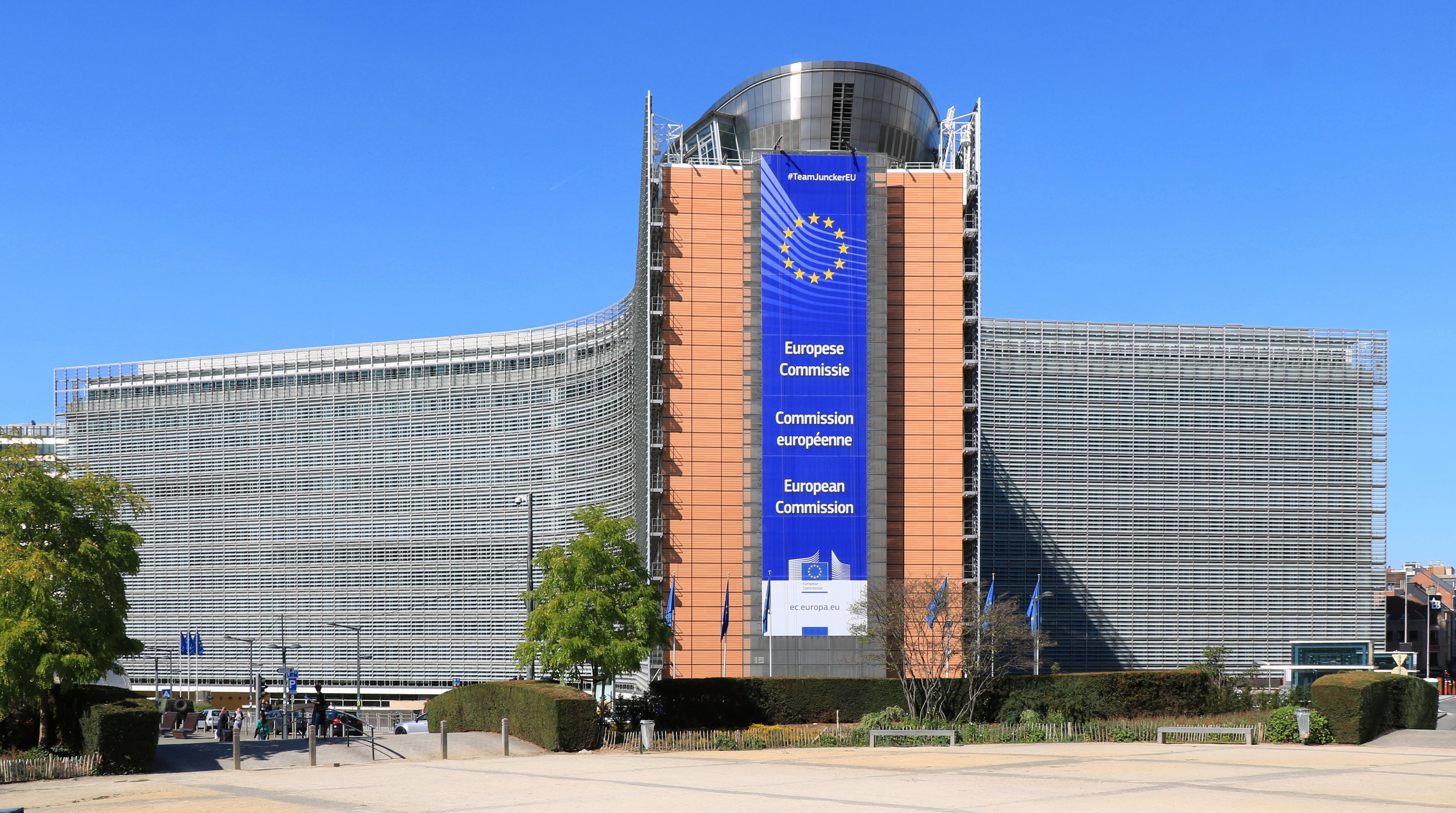
Headquarters of the European Commission, which has imposed several fines on Microsoft

Released in January 2007, the next version of Windows, Vista, focused on features, security and a redesigned user interface dubbed Aero. Microsoft Office 2007, released at the same time, featured a "Ribbon" user interface which was a significant departure from its predecessors. Relatively strong sales of both products helped to produce a record profit in 2007. The European Union imposed another fine of €899 million ($1.4 billion) for Microsoft's lack of compliance with the March 2004 judgment on February 27, 2008, saying that the company charged rivals unreasonable prices for key information about its workgroup and backoffice servers. Microsoft stated that it was in compliance and that "these fines are about the past issues that have been resolved". Gates retired from his role as Chief Software Architect on June 27, 2008, a decision announced in June 2006, while retaining other positions related to the company in addition to being an advisor for the company on key projects. Azure Services Platform, the company's entry into the cloud computing market for Windows, launched on October 27, 2008. On February 12, 2009, Microsoft announced its intent to open a chain of Microsoft-branded retail stores, and on October 22, 2009, the first retail Microsoft Store opened in Scottsdale, Arizona; the same day Windows 7 was officially released to the public.

As the smartphone industry boomed in the late 2000s, Microsoft had struggled to keep up with its rivals in providing a modern smartphone operating system, falling behind Apple and Google-sponsored Android in the United States. As a result, in 2010 Microsoft revamped its aging flagship mobile operating system, Windows Mobile, replacing it with the new Windows Phone OS that was released in October that year. It used a new user interface design language, codenamed "Metro", which prominently used simple shapes, typography, and iconography, utilizing the concept of minimalism. Microsoft implemented a new strategy for the software industry, providing a consistent user experience across all smartphones using the Windows Phone OS. It launched an alliance with Nokia in 2011 and Microsoft worked closely with the company to co-develop Windows Phone, but remained partners with long-time Windows Mobile OEM HTC. Microsoft is a founding member of the Open Networking Foundation started on March 23, 2011. This nonprofit organization is focused on providing support for a cloud computing initiative called Software-Defined Networking. The initiative is meant to speed innovation through simple software changes in telecommunications networks, wireless networks, data centers, and other networking areas.

=== 2011–2014: Windows 8/8.1, Xbox One, Outlook.com, and Surface devices ===
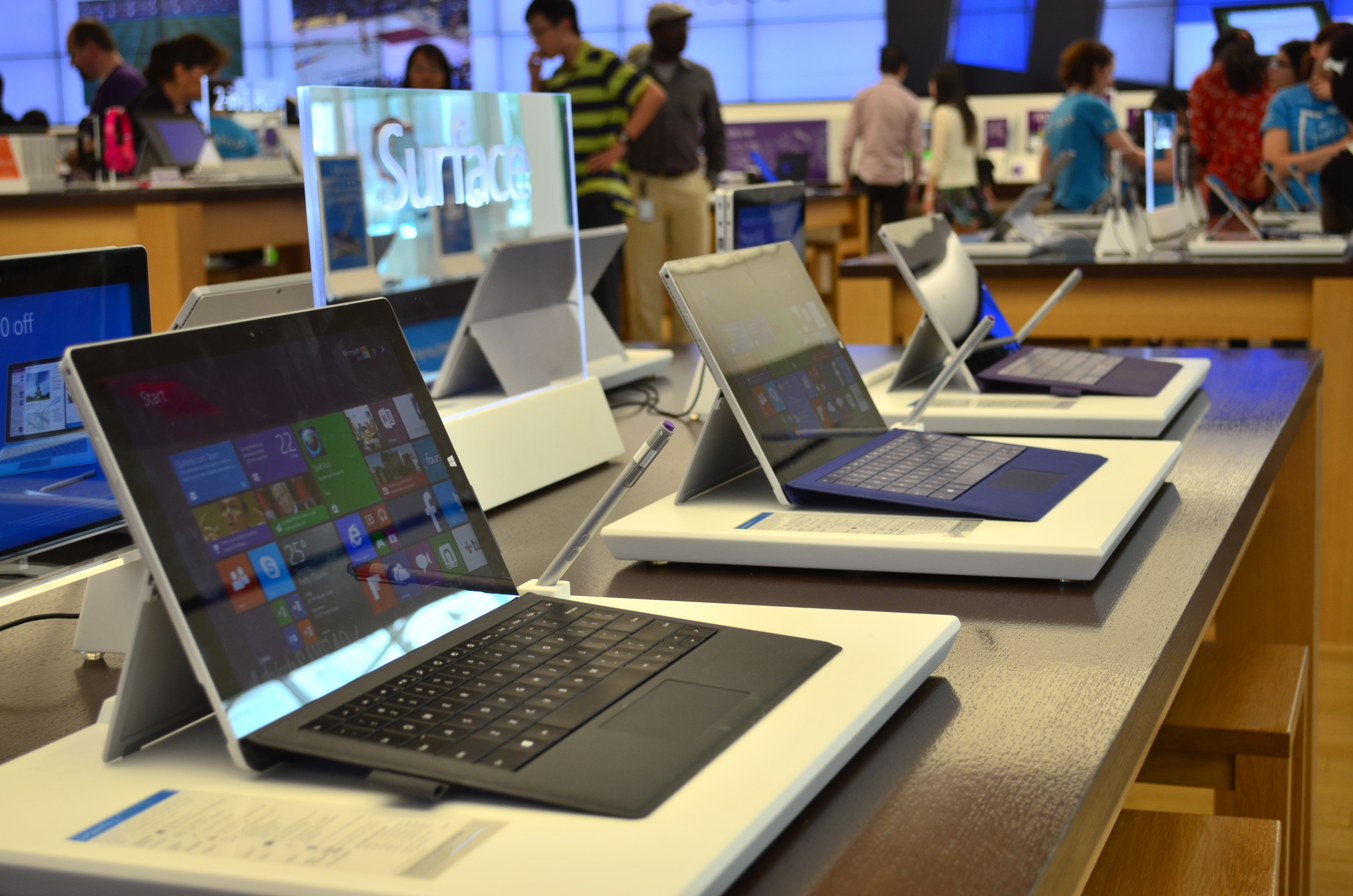
Surface Pro 3, part of the Surface series of 2-in-1 laptops by Microsoft

Following the release of Windows Phone, Microsoft undertook a gradual rebranding of its product range throughout 2011 and 2012, with the corporation's logos, products, services, and websites adopting the principles and concepts of the Metro design language. Microsoft unveiled Windows 8, an operating system designed to power both personal computers and tablet computers, in Taipei in June 2011. Also in 2011, Microsoft saw its largest acquisition by taking over Skype.

The Surface was unveiled in June 2012, becoming the first computer in the company's history to have its hardware made by Microsoft. On June 25, Microsoft paid US$1.2 billion to buy the social network Yammer. On July 31, it launched the Outlook.com webmail service to compete with Gmail. On September 4, 2012, Microsoft released Windows Server 2012.

In July 2012, Microsoft sold its 50% stake in MSNBC, which it had run as a joint venture with NBC since 1996. In October 2012, Microsoft launched Windows 8, Microsoft Surface, and Windows Phone 8. To cope with the potential for an increase in demand for products and services, Microsoft opened a number of "holiday stores" across the U.S. to complement the increasing number of "bricks-and-mortar" Microsoft Stores that opened in 2012. On March 29, 2013, Microsoft launched a Patent Tracker.

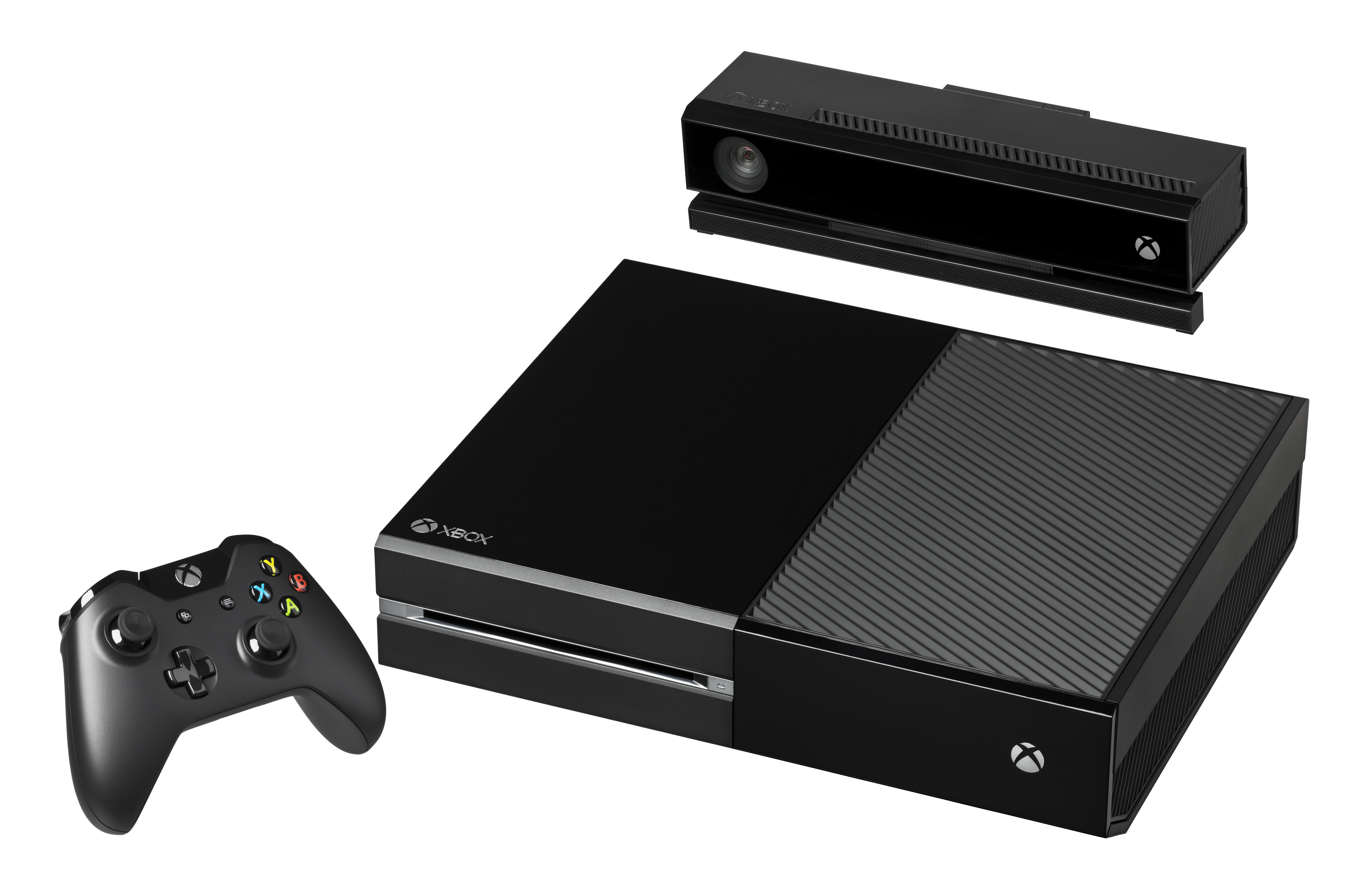
The Xbox One console, released in 2013

In August 2012, the New York City Police Department announced a partnership with Microsoft for the development of the Domain Awareness System which is used for police surveillance in New York City.

The Kinect, a motion-sensing input device made by Microsoft and designed as a video game controller, first introduced in November 2010, was upgraded for the 2013 release of the Xbox One video game console. On July 19, 2013, Microsoft stocks suffered its biggest one-day percentage sell-off since the year 2000, after its fourth-quarter report raised concerns among investors on the poor showings of both Windows 8 and the Surface tablet. Microsoft suffered a loss of more than US$32 billion.

In line with the maturing PC business, in July 2013, Microsoft announced that it would reorganize into four new business divisions: Operating Systems, Apps, Cloud, and Devices. All previous divisions were dissolved into new divisions without any workforce cuts. On September 3, 2013, Microsoft agreed to buy Nokia's mobile unit for $7 billion, following Amy Hood taking the role of CFO.

=== 2014–2020: Windows 10, Microsoft Edge, and HoloLens ===
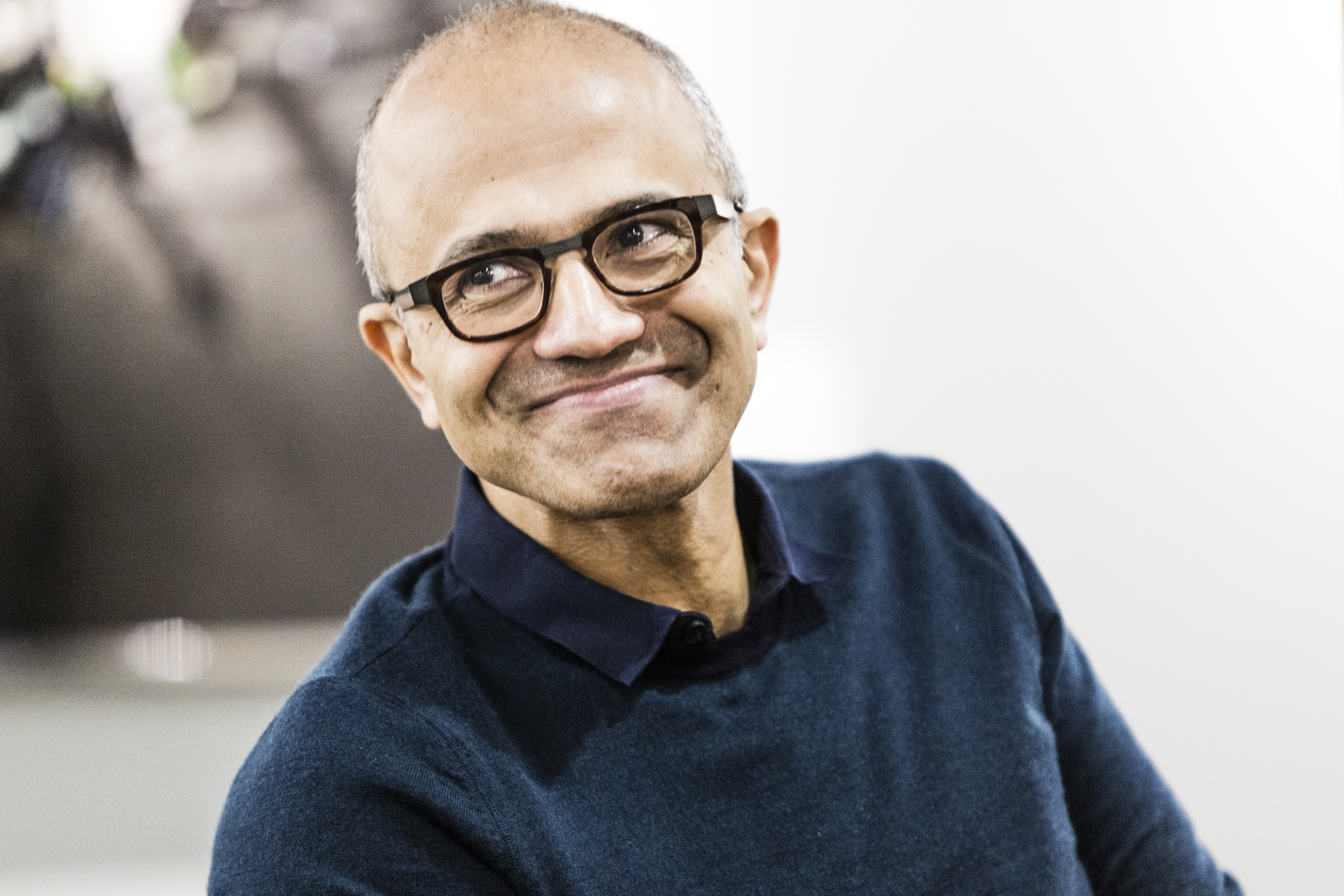
Satya Nadella succeeded Steve Ballmer as the CEO of Microsoft in February 2014.

On February 4, 2014, Steve Ballmer stepped down as CEO of Microsoft and was succeeded by Satya Nadella, who previously led Microsoft's Cloud and Enterprise division. On the same day, John W. Thompson took on the role of chairman, in place of Bill Gates, who continued to participate as a technology advisor. Thompson became the second chairman in Microsoft's history. On April 25, 2014, Microsoft acquired Nokia Devices and Services for $7.2 billion. This new subsidiary was renamed Microsoft Mobile Oy. On September 15, 2014, Microsoft acquired the video game development company Mojang, best known for Minecraft, for $2.5 billion. Since Nadella became CEO, the company has changed focus towards cloud computing.

On January 21, 2015, Microsoft announced the release of its first interactive whiteboard, named Surface Hub. On July 29, 2015, Windows 10 was released, with its server sibling, Windows Server 2016, released in September 2016. Microsoft's share of the U.S. smartphone market in January 2016 was 2.7%. During the summer of 2015 the company lost $7.6 billion related to its mobile-phone business, firing 7,800 employees.

In 2015, the construction of a data center in Mecklenburg County, Virginia, led to the destruction of a historic African American cemetery despite archeological recommendations for preservation.

On March 1, 2016, Microsoft announced the merger of its PC and Xbox divisions, with Phil Spencer announcing that Universal Windows Platform (UWP) apps would be the focus for Microsoft's gaming in the future. Microsoft also acquired LinkedIn in 2016. On January 24, 2017, Microsoft showcased Intune for Education at the BETT 2017 education technology conference in London. Intune for Education is a new cloud-based application and device management service for the education sector. In May 2016, the company announced it was laying off 1,850 workers, and taking an impairment and restructuring charge of $950 million.

In June 2016, Microsoft announced a project named Microsoft Azure Information Protection. It aims to help enterprises protect their data as it moves between servers and devices. In November 2016, Microsoft joined the Linux Foundation as a Platinum member during Microsoft's Connect(); developer event in New York. The cost of each Platinum membership is US$500,000 per year. Some analysts had deemed this unthinkable ten years prior, however, as in 2001 then-CEO Steve Ballmer called Linux "cancer".

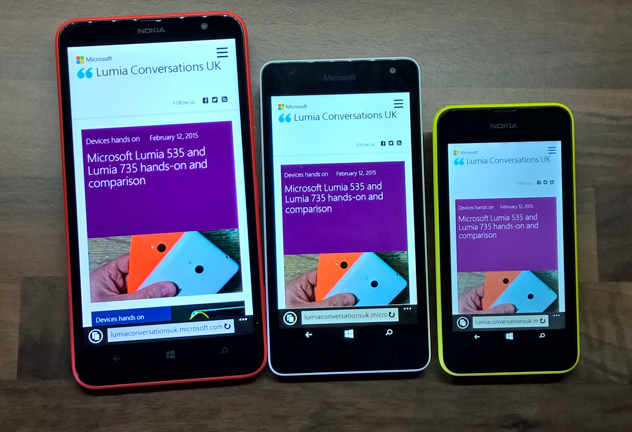
The Nokia Lumia 1320, the Microsoft Lumia 535 and the Nokia Lumia 530, which all run on one of the now-discontinued Windows Phone operating systems

In January 2018, Microsoft patched Windows 10 to account for CPU problems related to Intel's Meltdown security breach. The patch led to issues with the Microsoft Azure virtual machines reliant on Intel's CPU architecture. On January 12, Microsoft released PowerShell Core 6.0 for the macOS and Linux operating systems. In February 2018, Microsoft ceased notification support for its Windows Phone devices which effectively ended firmware updates for the discontinued devices. In March 2018, Microsoft recalled Windows 10 S to change it to a mode for the Windows operating system rather than a separate and unique operating system. In March the company also established guidelines that censor users of Office 365 from using profanity in private documents.

In April 2018, Microsoft released the source code for Windows File Manager under the MIT License to celebrate the program's 20th anniversary. In April the company further expressed willingness to embrace open source initiatives by announcing Azure Sphere as its own derivative of the Linux operating system. In May 2018, Microsoft partnered with 17 American intelligence agencies to develop cloud computing products. The project is dubbed "Azure Government" and has ties to the Joint Enterprise Defense Infrastructure (JEDI) surveillance program. On June 4, 2018, Microsoft officially announced the acquisition of GitHub for $7.5 billion, a deal that closed on October 26, 2018. On July 10, 2018, Microsoft revealed the Surface Go platform to the public. A free version of Teams was released on July 12, 2018. In August 2018, Microsoft released two projects called Microsoft AccountGuard and Defending Democracy. It also unveiled Snapdragon 850 compatibility for Windows 10 on the ARM architecture.

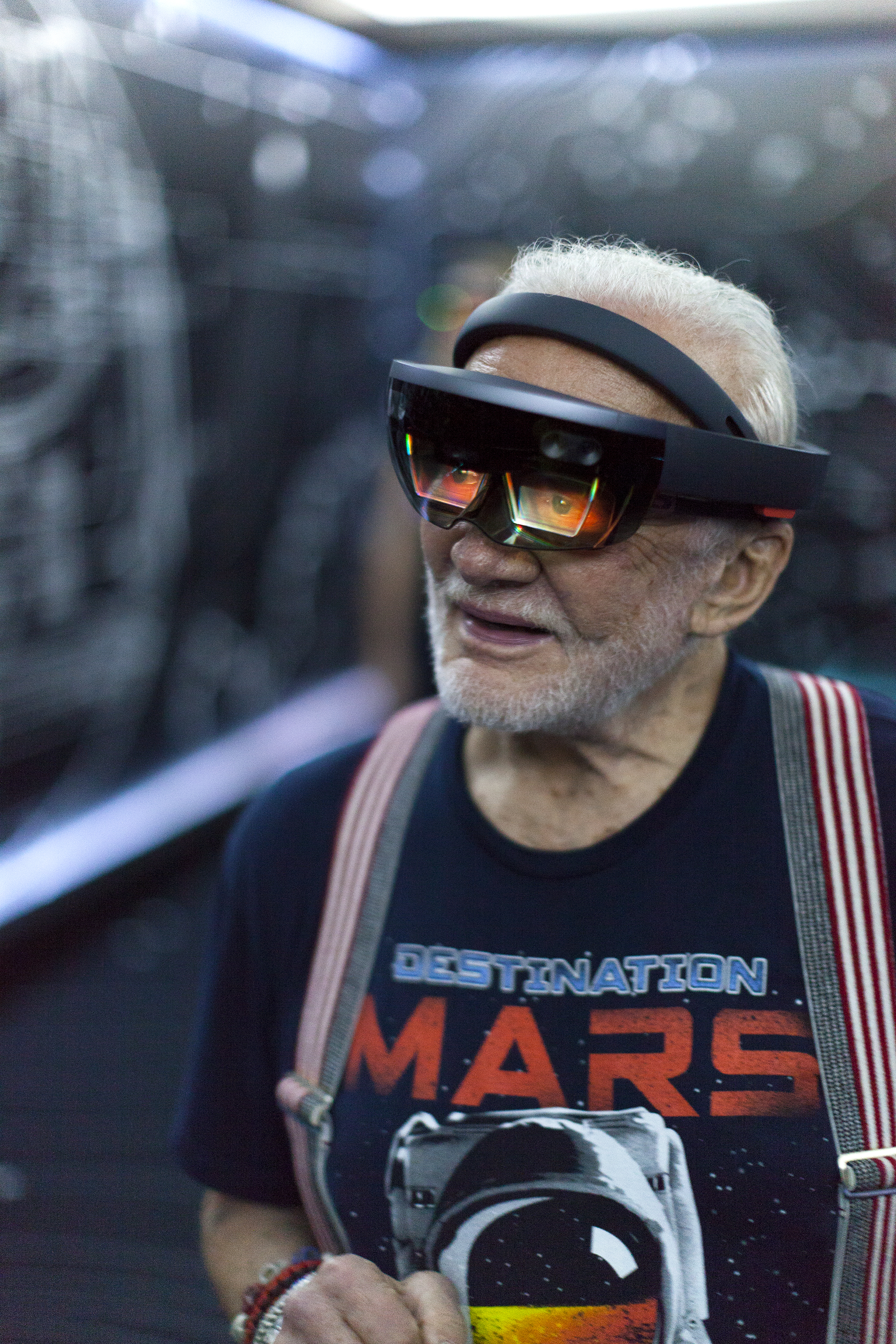
Apollo 11 astronaut Buzz Aldrin using a Microsoft HoloLens mixed reality headset in September 2016

In August 2018, Toyota Tsusho began a partnership with Microsoft to create fish farming tools using the Microsoft Azure application suite for Internet of things (IoT) technologies related to water management. Developed in part by researchers from Kindai University, the water pump mechanisms use artificial intelligence to count the number of fish on a conveyor belt, analyze the number of fish, and deduce the effectiveness of water flow from the data the fish provide.

In September 2018, Microsoft discontinued Skype Classic. On October 10, 2018, Microsoft joined the Open Invention Network community despite holding more than 60,000 patents. In November 2018, Microsoft agreed to supply 100,000 Microsoft HoloLens headsets to the United States military in order to "increase lethality by enhancing the ability to detect, decide and engage before the enemy." In November 2018, Microsoft introduced Azure Multi-Factor Authentication for Microsoft Azure.

In December 2018, Microsoft announced Project Mu, an open source release of the Unified Extensible Firmware Interface (UEFI) core used in Microsoft Surface and Hyper-V products. The project promotes the idea of Firmware as a Service. In the same month, Microsoft announced the open source implementation of Windows Forms and the Windows Presentation Foundation (WPF) which will allow for further movement of the company toward the transparent release of key frameworks used in developing Windows desktop applications and software. December also saw the company discontinue the Microsoft Edge [Legacy] browser project in favor of the "New Edge" browser project, featuring a Chromium based backend.

In February 2019, hundreds of Microsoft employees protested what they termed war profiteering by the company from its $480 million contract to develop virtual reality headsets for the United States Army.

=== 2020–present: acquisitions, Xbox Series X/S, and Windows 11 ===
On August 5, 2020, Microsoft stopped its xCloud game streaming test for iOS devices. Apple imposed a strict limit on "remote desktop clients" which means applications are only allowed to connect to a user-owned host device or gaming console owned by the user. On September 21, 2020, Microsoft announced its intent to acquire video game company ZeniMax Media, the parent company of Bethesda Softworks. On March 9, 2021, the acquisition was finalized at $8.1 billion and ZeniMax Media became part of Microsoft's Xbox Game Studios division.

On November 10, 2020, Microsoft released the Xbox Series X and Xbox Series S video game consoles.

In February 2021, Microsoft released Azure Quantum for public preview. The public cloud computing platform provides access to quantum software and quantum hardware including trapped ion, neutral atom, and superconducting systems.

In April 2021, Microsoft announced it would buy Nuance Communications for approximately $16 billion, completing the acquisition in March 2022. In 2021, in part due to the strong quarterly earnings spurred by the COVID-19 pandemic, Microsoft's valuation came to nearly $2 trillion. The increased necessity for remote work and distance education drove demand for cloud computing and grew the company's gaming sales.

On June 24, 2021, Microsoft announced Windows 11 during a livestreamed event. The announcement came with confusion after Microsoft announced Windows 10 would be the last version of the operating system. It was released to the general public on October 5, 2021.

In September 2021, it was announced that the company had acquired TakeLessons, an online platform that connects students and tutors in numerous subjects. The acquisition positioned Microsoft to grow its presence in the market of providing online education to large numbers of people. In the same month, Microsoft acquired Australia-based video editing software company Clipchamp.

In October 2021, Microsoft announced that it began rolling out end-to-end encryption (E2EE) support for Microsoft Teams calls in order to secure business communication while using video conferencing software. On October 7, Microsoft acquired Ally.io, a software service that measures companies' progress against OKRs, planning to incorporate it into its Viva family of employee experience products.

On January 18, 2022, Microsoft announced the acquisition of American video game developer and holding company Activision Blizzard in an all-cash deal worth $68.7 billion, which was completed in 2023. Microsoft also named Phil Spencer, head of the Xbox brand since 2014, the inaugural CEO of the newly established Microsoft Gaming division, which now houses the Xbox operations team and the three publishers in the company's portfolio (Xbox Game Studios, ZeniMax Media, Activision Blizzard). Microsoft had not released statements regarding Activision's recent legal controversies regarding employee abuse, but reports have alleged that Activision CEO Bobby Kotick, a major target of the controversy, would leave the company after the acquisition is finalized. The deal was closed on October 13, 2023.

In January 2023, CEO Satya Nadella announced Microsoft would lay off 10,000 employees. The announcement came a day after hosting a Sting concert for 50 people, including Microsoft executives, in Davos, Switzerland.

On January 23, 2023, Microsoft announced a new multi-year, multi-billion dollar investment deal with ChatGPT developer OpenAI.

In June 2023, Microsoft released Azure Quantum Elements to run molecular simulations and calculations in computational chemistry and materials science using a combination of AI, high-performance computing and quantum computing. The service includes Copilot, a GPT-4 based large language model tool to query and visualize data, write code, initiate simulations, and educate researchers.

At a November 2023 developer conference, Microsoft announced two new custom-designed computing chips: The Maia chip, designed to run large language models, and Cobalt CPU, designed to power general cloud services on Azure.

On November 20, 2023, Satya Nadella announced that Sam Altman, who had been ousted as CEO of OpenAI just days earlier, and Greg Brockman, who had resigned as president, would join Microsoft to lead a new advanced AI research team. However, the plan was short-lived, as Altman was subsequently reinstated as OpenAI's CEO and Brockman rejoined the company amid pressure from OpenAI's employees and investors on its board. In March 2024, Inflection AI's cofounders Mustafa Suleyman and Karen Simonyan announced their departure from the company in order to start Microsoft AI, with Microsoft acqui-hiring nearly the entirety of its 70-person workforce. As part of the deal, Microsoft paid Inflection $650 million to license its technology.

In January 2024, Microsoft became the most valued publicly traded company. Meanwhile, that month, the company announced a subscription offering of artificial intelligence for small businesses via Copilot Pro.

In June 2024, Microsoft announced it would be laying off 1,000 employees from the company's mixed reality and Azure cloud computing divisions. The same month, Microsoft announced that its data centre infrastructure arm, MSFT MCIO Ltd., was building a "hyperscale data centre" at the former Skelton Grange power station site in south east Leeds.

In July 2024, it was reported that the company was laying off its diversity, equity, and inclusion (DEI) team. On July 19, a global IT outage impacted Microsoft services, affecting businesses, airlines, and financial institutions worldwide. The outage was traced back to a flawed update of CrowdStrike's cybersecurity software, which resulted in Microsoft systems crashing and causing disruptions across various sectors. Despite CrowdStrike's CEO George Kurtz clarifying that the issue was not a cyberattack, the incident had widespread consequences, leading to delays in air travel, financial transactions, and medical services globally. Microsoft stated that the underlying cause had been fixed but acknowledged ongoing residual impacts on some Microsoft 365 apps and services.

In September 2024, BlackRock and Microsoft announced a $30 billion fund, the Global AI Infrastructure Investment Partnership, to invest in AI infrastructure such as data centers and energy projects. Partners include Abu Dhabi-backed MGX and Nvidia, which will provide AI expertise. Investments will primarily focus on the U.S., with some in partner countries. Microsoft also announced relaunch of its controversial tool, Recall, in November 2024 after addressing privacy concerns. Initially criticized for taking regular screenshots without user consent, Recall was changed to an opt-in feature instead of being default on. The UK's Information Commissioner's Office monitored the situation and noted the adjustments, which included enhanced security measures like encryption and biometric access. While experts regarded these changes as improvements, they advised caution, with some recommending further testing before users opted in.

On February 28, 2025, Microsoft announced that Skype would be shutting down on May 5, 2025, to streamline its focus on Microsoft Teams. The company stated there would be no job cuts due to the shutdown.

In mid-2025, Microsoft's Russian division, Microsoft Rus LLC, filed for bankruptcy after President Vladimir Putin stated that foreign services providers should be throttled in Russia to make way for domestic software. The company had restructured operations in Russia after the 2022 Russian invasion of Ukraine, but those restructuring efforts had failed.

On May 23, 2025, it was reported that Europol's European Cybercrime Centre worked with Microsoft to disrupt Lumma Stealer, a significant infostealer threat. The joint operation targeted a sophisticated ecosystem that allowed criminals to exploit stolen information on a massive scale.

In June 2025, a United Nations report on corporations complicit in the Gaza genocide showed that Microsoft was one of several companies "central to Israel's surveillance apparatus and the ongoing Gaza destruction".

On July 2, 2025, Microsoft announced it would cut nearly 4% of its workforce, around 9,000 jobs, to control costs amid heavy AI infrastructure spending, while also restructuring management and streamlining operations.

According to an analysis by Bridgewater Associates, Microsoft—along with Amazon, Alphabet and Meta—is expected to collectively invest about $650 billion to scale up AI-related infrastructure in 2026.

In March 2026, Microsoft-controlled discussion forums banned the nickname Microslop, used to express pushback against Microsoft's Copilot-based and GenAI efforts.

In March 2026, Microsoft signed an energy pledge at the White House which required it to bear the cost of new electricity generation to power its data centers.

On 9 March 2026, Microsoft unveiled the Copilot Cowork tool, which is based on Claude Cowork, tapping into the growing demand for autonomous agents.

At Microsoft Build 2026 in June 2026, Microsoft announced the preview availability of Azure Cobalt 200 virtual machines, its second-generation Arm-based custom CPU, offering up to 135% better performance for cloud database workloads and 50% overall CPU performance improvement over the previous generation Cobalt 100. Microsoft also confirmed that its Maia 200 AI accelerator, first revealed in January 2026, had entered production deployment in data centers in Iowa and Arizona, powering workloads including Microsoft 365 Copilot and OpenAI's GPT-5.2 models.

On November 12, Microsoft suffered a worldwide software outage, affecting 74 countries and territories, which stretched into the following day. Mail service access was mainly restored on November 13. The company pledged to provide more details once the outage was addressed.

== Corporate affairs ==
Microsoft is ranked No. 14 in the 2022 Fortune 500 rankings of the largest United States corporations by total revenue; and it was the world's largest software maker by revenue in 2022 according to Forbes Global 2000. In 2018, Microsoft became the most valuable publicly traded company in the world, a position it has repeatedly traded with Apple in the years since. In April 2019, Microsoft became the third U.S. public company to be valued at over $1 trillion. (Note: After Apple and Amazon, respectively) As of 2024, Microsoft has the third-highest global brand valuation. Microsoft is one of only two U.S.-based companies that have a prime credit rating of AAA. It is a Big Tech company.

=== Board of directors ===
The company is run by a board of directors made up of mostly company outsiders, as is customary for publicly traded companies. Members of the board of directors as of December 2023 are Satya Nadella, Reid Hoffman, Hugh Johnston, Teri List, Sandi Peterson, Penny Pritzker, Carlos Rodriguez, Charles Scharf, John W. Stanton, John W. Thompson, Emma Walmsley and Padmasree Warrior.

Board members are elected every year at the annual shareholders' meeting using a majority vote system. There are four committees within the board that oversee more specific matters. These committees include the Audit Committee, which handles accounting issues with the company including auditing and reporting; the Compensation Committee, which approves compensation for the CEO and other employees of the company; the Governance and Nominating Committee, which handles various corporate matters including the nomination of the board; and the Regulatory and Public Policy Committee, which includes legal/antitrust matters, along with privacy, trade, digital safety, artificial intelligence, and environmental sustainability.

On March 13, 2020, Gates announced that he is leaving the board of directors of Microsoft and Berkshire Hathaway to focus more on his philanthropic efforts. According to Aaron Tilley of The Wall Street Journal this is "marking the biggest boardroom departure in the tech industry since the death of longtime rival and Apple Inc. co-founder Steve Jobs."

On January 13, 2022, The Wall Street Journal reported that Microsoft's board of directors plans to hire an external law firm to review its sexual harassment and gender discrimination policies, and to release a summary of how the company handled past allegations of misconduct against Bill Gates and other corporate executives.

=== Chief executives ===
1. Bill Gates (1975–2000)
2. Steve Ballmer (2000–2014)
3. Satya Nadella (2014–present)

=== Financial ===
Five year history graph of Nasdaq: MSFT stock on July 17, 2013.

When Microsoft went public and launched its initial public offering (IPO) in 1986, the opening stock price was $21; after the trading day, the price closed at $27.75. As of July 2010, with the company's nine stock splits, any IPO shares would be multiplied by 288; if one were to buy the IPO today, given the splits and other factors, it would cost about 9 cents. The stock price peaked in 1999 at around $119 ($60.928, adjusting for splits).

Microsoft began to offer a dividend on January 16, 2003, starting at eight cents per share for the fiscal year followed by a dividend of sixteen cents per share the subsequent year, switching from yearly to quarterly dividends in 2005 with eight cents a share per quarter and a special one-time payout of three dollars per share for the second quarter of the fiscal year. Though the company had subsequent increases in dividend payouts, the price of Microsoft's stock remained steady for years.

Standard & Poor's and Moody's Investors Service have both given a AAA rating to Microsoft, whose assets were valued at $41 billion as compared to only $8.5 billion in unsecured debt. Consequently, in February 2011 Microsoft released a corporate bond amounting to $2.25 billion with relatively low borrowing rates compared to government bonds. For the first time in 20 years Apple Inc. surpassed Microsoft in Q1 2011 quarterly profits and revenues due to a slowdown in PC sales and continuing huge losses in Microsoft's Online Services Division (which contains its search engine Bing). Microsoft profits were $5.2 billion, while Apple Inc. profits were $6 billion, on revenues of $14.5 billion and $24.7 billion respectively. Microsoft's Online Services Division has been continuously loss-making since 2006 and in Q1 2011 it lost $726 million. This follows a loss of $2.5 billion for the year 2010.

Sales by region (2023)
Region	Sales in billion $	share
United States	106.7	50.4%
Other countries	105.2	49.6%

On July 20, 2012, Microsoft posted its first quarterly loss ever, despite earning record revenues for the quarter and fiscal year, with a net loss of $492 million due to a writedown related to the advertising company aQuantive, which had been acquired for $6.2 billion back in 2007. As of January 2014, Microsoft's market capitalization stood at $314B, making it the 8th-largest company in the world by market capitalization.

In November 2014, Microsoft overtook ExxonMobil to become the second most-valuable company by market capitalization, behind only Apple Inc. Its total market value was over $410B—with the stock price hitting $50.04 a share, the highest since early 2000. In 2015, Reuters reported that Microsoft had earnings abroad of $76.4 billion which were untaxed by the Internal Revenue Service. Under U.S. law, corporations do not pay U.S. income tax on overseas profits until the profits are brought into the United States.

The key trends of Microsoft are, as at the financial year ending June 30:

Year	Revenue in billion US$	Net income in billion US$	Total Assets in billion US$	Employees
2005	39.7	12.2	70.8	61,000
2006	44.2	12.5	69.5	71,000
2007	51.1	14.0	63.1	79,000
2008	60.4	17.6	72.7	91,000
2009	58.4	14.5	77.8	93,000
2010	62.4	18.7	86.1	89,000
2011	69.9	23.1	108	90,000
2012	73.7	16.9	121	94,000
2013	77.8	21.8	142	99,000
2014	86.8	22.0	172	128,000
2015	93.5	12.1	174	118,000
2016	91.1	20.5	193	114,000
2017	96.5	21.2	250	124,000
2018	110	16.5	258	131,000
2019	125	39.2	286	144,106
2020	143	44.2	301	163,000
2021	168	61.2	333	181,000
2022	198	72.7	364	221,000
2023	211	72.3	411	238,000
2024	245	88.1	512	228,000
2025	282	101.8	619	228,000
2026	331.8	133.7	758.4	223,000

In November 2018, the company won a $480 million military contract with the U.S. government to bring augmented reality (AR) headset technology into the weapon repertoires of American soldiers. The two-year contract may result in follow-on orders of more than 100,000 headsets, according to documentation describing the bidding process. One of the contract's tag lines for the augmented reality technology seems to be its ability to enable "25 bloodless battles before the 1st battle", suggesting that actual combat training is going to be an essential aspect of the augmented reality headset capabilities.

=== Subsidiaries ===
Microsoft is an international business. As such, it needs subsidiaries present in whatever national markets it chooses to harvest. An example is Microsoft Canada, which it established in 1985. Other countries have similar installations, to funnel profits back up to Redmond and to distribute the dividends to the holders of MSFT stock.

=== Marketing ===
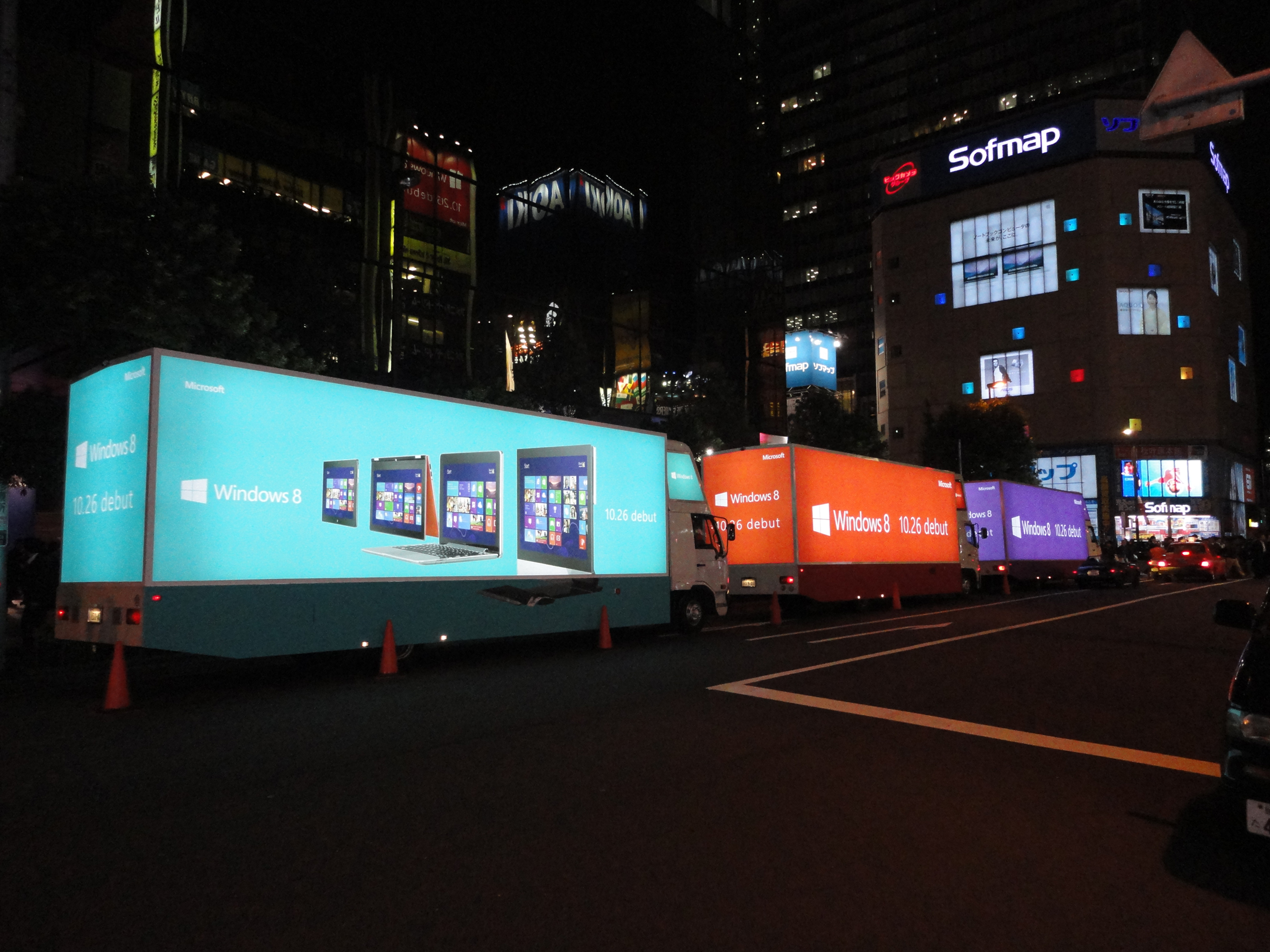
Windows 8 Launch Event in Akihabara, Tokyo, on October 25, 2012

In FY 2025, Microsoft spent over 25 billion dollars on marketing, or over 15 % of its expenses, compared to over 30 billion dollars spent on research and development. Microsoft employed over 40 thousand people in marketing and sales.

In 2004, Microsoft commissioned research firms to do independent studies comparing the total cost of ownership (TCO) of Windows Server 2003 to Linux; the firms concluded that companies found Windows easier to administrate than Linux, thus those using Windows would administrate faster resulting in lower costs for their company (i.e. lower TCO). This spurred a wave of related studies; a study by the Yankee Group concluded that upgrading from one version of Windows Server to another costs a fraction of the switching costs from Windows Server to Linux, although companies surveyed noted the increased security and reliability of Linux servers and concern about being locked into using Microsoft products. Another study, released by the Open Source Development Labs, claimed that the Microsoft studies were "simply outdated and one-sided" and its survey concluded that the TCO of Linux was lower due to Linux administrators managing more servers on average and other reasons.

=== Layoffs ===
In July 2014, Microsoft announced plans to lay off 18,000 employees. Microsoft employed 127,104 people as of June 5, 2014, making this about a 14 percent reduction of its workforce as the biggest Microsoft layoff ever. This included 12,500 professional and factory personnel. Previously, Microsoft had eliminated 5,800 jobs in 2009 in line with the Great Recession of 2008–2017. In September 2014, Microsoft laid off 2,100 people, including 747 people in the Seattle–Redmond area, where the company is headquartered. The firings came as a second wave of the layoffs that were previously announced. This brought the total number to over 15,000 out of the 18,000 expected cuts. In October 2014, Microsoft revealed that it was almost done with eliminating 18,000 employees, which was its largest-ever layoff sweep. In July 2015, Microsoft announced another 7,800 job cuts in the next several months. In May 2016, Microsoft announced another 1,850 job cuts mostly in its Nokia mobile phone division. As a result, the company will record an impairment and restructuring charge of approximately $950 million, of which approximately $200 million will relate to severance payments.

Microsoft laid off 1,900 employees in its gaming division in January 2024. The layoffs primarily affected Activision Blizzard employees, but some Xbox and ZeniMax employees were also affected. Blizzard president Mike Ybarra and chief design officer Allen Adham also resigned.

In May 2025, Microsoft announced that it was laying off more than 6,000 employees, around three percent of the company's entire workforce. In July 2025, Microsoft announced another round of layoffs, cutting approximately 9,000 employees in its largest workforce reduction in over two years. The cuts affected multiple divisions, including Xbox, with 830 positions eliminated at its Redmond, Washington headquarters.

Amid the layoffs, Microsoft also closed its office in Pakistan and laid off its employees there as part of its move toward a software-as-a-service and AI operating model.

In July 2026, Microsoft announced that it would eliminate 4,800 jobs, representing about 2.1% of its workforce, primarily affecting its Commercial and Xbox divisions. Amy Coleman, Microsoft's executive vice president and chief people officer, said the layoffs were not the result of employees being replaced by AI, but acknowledged that AI is changing how work is done. Of the total job cuts, 1,600 were in the Xbox division. Xbox CEO Asha Sharma said the division would reduce its workforce by 3,200 roles through fiscal year 2027, with the remaining reductions taking place over the following year. The restructuring included the transfer of four Xbox game studios—Compulsion Games, Double Fine Productions, Ninja Theory, and Undead Labs—to independent or new ownership, while the future of Arkane Studios remained under review in France.

In October 2026, the company made what it termed a "voluntary exit offer" to 60,000 employees, about 25% of its workforce—across the US, Canada, India, and the UK. Eligible staff included level 70 and below in teams such as Windows, Xbox, Finance, and AI divisions, excluding data center operations and cybersecurity. The company introduced the plan to reduce headcount and shift capital to AI investments including data centers and chips.

=== Unions ===
Microsoft recognizes seven trade unions (Note: Game Workers Alliance (Raven Software); Game Workers Alliance Albany; Activision Quality Assurance United-CWA; ZeniMax Workers United/CWA; OneBGS (Bethesda Game Studios); World of Warcraft; Texas Blizzard QA United-CWA) representing 1,750 workers in the United States at its video game subsidiaries Activision Blizzard and ZeniMax Media. U.S. workers have been vocal in opposing military and law-enforcement contracts with Microsoft. Bethesda Game Studios is unionized in Canada. Microsoft South Korea has recognized its union since 2017. German employees have elected works councils since 1998.

=== United States government ===
Microsoft provides information about reported bugs in its software to intelligence agencies of the United States government, prior to the public release of the fix. A Microsoft spokesperson stated that the corporation runs several programs that facilitate the sharing of such information with the U.S. government. Following media reports about PRISM, NSA's massive electronic surveillance program, in May 2013, several technology companies were identified as participants, including Microsoft. According to leaks of said program, Microsoft joined the PRISM program in 2007. However, in June 2013, an official statement from Microsoft flatly denied its participation in the program:

"We provide customer data only when we receive a legally binding order or subpoena to do so, and never on a voluntary basis. In addition, we only ever comply with orders for requests about specific accounts or identifiers. If the government has a broader voluntary national security program to gather customer data, we don't participate in it."

During the first six months of 2013, Microsoft received requests that affected between 15,000 and 15,999 accounts. In December 2013, the company made a statement to further emphasize that it takes its customers' privacy and data protection very seriously, saying that "government snooping potentially now constitutes an 'advanced persistent threat,' alongside sophisticated malware and cyber attacks". The statement also marked the beginning of three-part program to enhance Microsoft's encryption and transparency efforts. On July 1, 2014, as part of this program, it opened the first (of many) Microsoft Transparency Center, which provides "participating governments with the ability to review source code for our key products, assure themselves of their software integrity, and confirm there are no "back doors." Microsoft has also argued that the United States Congress should enact strong privacy regulations to protect consumer data.

In April 2016, the company sued the U.S. government, argued that secrecy orders were preventing the company from disclosing warrants to customers in violation of the company's and customers' rights. Microsoft argued that it was unconstitutional for the government to indefinitely ban Microsoft from informing its users that the government was requesting their emails and other documents and that the Fourth Amendment made it so people or businesses had the right to know if the government searches or seizes their property. On October 23, 2017, Microsoft said it would drop the lawsuit as a result of a policy change by the United States Department of Justice (DoJ). The DoJ had "changed data request rules on alerting the Internet users about agencies accessing their information."

In 2022 Microsoft shared a $9 billion contract from the United States Department of Defense for cloud computing with Amazon, Google, and Oracle.

=== Security challenges ===
On a Friday afternoon in January 2024, Microsoft disclosed that a Russian state-sponsored group hacked into its corporate systems. The group, accessed "a very small percentage" of Microsoft corporate email accounts, which also included members of its senior leadership team and employees in its cybersecurity and legal teams. Microsoft noted in a blog post that the attack might have been prevented if the accounts in question had enabled multi-factor authentication, a defensive measure which is widely recommended in the industry, including by Microsoft itself.

== Corporate identity ==
=== Corporate culture ===
[T]he Microsoft method. Understand the market, and the customers, and then go pedal to the metal, with release after release focused on what the customers need, incorporating their feedback. That puts the competition into reaction mode. And of course it helps if they also make a strategic error because they are under so much pressure.

— Chris Pratley of Microsoft, 2004

Technical references for developers and articles for various Microsoft magazines such as Microsoft Systems Journal (MSJ) are available through the Microsoft Developer Network (MSDN). MSDN also offers subscriptions for companies and individuals, and the more expensive subscriptions usually offer access to pre-release beta versions of Microsoft software. In April 2004, Microsoft launched a community site for developers and users, titled Channel 9, that provides a wiki and an Internet forum. Another community site that provides daily videocasts and other services, On10.net, launched on March 3, 2006. Free technical support is traditionally provided through online Usenet newsgroups, and CompuServe in the past, monitored by Microsoft employees; there can be several newsgroups for a single product. Helpful people can be elected by peers or Microsoft employees for Microsoft Most Valuable Professional (MVP) status, which entitles them to a sort of special social status and possibilities for awards and other benefits.

Noted for its internal lexicon, the expression "eating your own dog food" is used to describe the policy of using pre-release and beta versions of products inside Microsoft to test them in "real-world" situations. This is usually shortened to just "dog food" and is used as a noun, verb, and adjective. Another bit of jargon, FYIFV or FYIV ("Fuck You, I'm [Fully] Vested"), is used by an employee to indicate they are financially independent and can avoid work anytime they wish.

Microsoft is an outspoken opponent of the cap on H-1B visas, which allows companies in the U.S. to employ certain foreign workers. Bill Gates claims the cap on H1B visas makes it difficult to hire employees for the company, stating "I'd certainly get rid of the H1B cap" in 2005. Critics of H1B visas argue that relaxing the limits would result in increased unemployment for U.S. citizens due to H1B workers working for lower salaries.

The Human Rights Campaign Corporate Equality Index, a report of how progressive the organization deems company policies towards LGBT employees, rated Microsoft as 87% from 2002 to 2004 and as 100% from 2005 to 2010 after it allowed gender expression.

In August 2018, Microsoft implemented a policy for all companies providing subcontractors to require 12 weeks of paid parental leave to each employee. This expands on the former requirement from 2015 requiring 15 days of paid vacation and sick leave each year. In 2015, Microsoft established its own parental leave policy to allow 12 weeks off for parental leave with an additional 8 weeks for the parent who gave birth.

=== Environment ===
In 2011, Greenpeace released a report rating the top ten big brands in cloud computing on the sources of electricity for their data centers. At the time, data centers consumed up to 2% of all global electricity, and this amount was projected to increase. Phil Radford of Greenpeace said, "We are concerned that this new explosion in electricity use could lock us into old, polluting energy sources instead of the clean energy available today", and called on "Amazon, Microsoft and other leaders of the information-technology industry must embrace clean energy to power their cloud-based data centers". In 2013, Microsoft agreed to buy power generated by a Texas wind project to power one of its data centers.

Microsoft is ranked on the 17th place in Greenpeace's Guide to Greener Electronics (16th Edition) that ranks 18 electronics manufacturers according to its policies on toxic chemicals, recycling, and climate change. Microsoft's deadline for phasing out brominated flame retardant (BFRs) and phthalates in all products was in 2012 but its commitment to phasing out PVC is not clear. As of January 2011, it has no products that are completely free from PVC and BFRs.

Microsoft's main U.S. campus received a silver certification from the Leadership in Energy and Environmental Design (LEED) program in 2008, and it installed over 2,000 solar panels on top of its buildings at its Silicon Valley campus, generating approximately 15 percent of the total energy needed by the facilities in April 2005. Microsoft makes use of alternative forms of transit. It created one of the world's largest private bus systems, the "Connector", to transport people from outside the company; for on-campus transportation, the "Shuttle Connect" uses a large fleet of hybrid cars to save fuel. The "Connector" does not compete with the public bus system and works with it to provide a cohesive transportation network not just for its employees but also for the public.

Microsoft also subsidizes regional public transport, provided by Sound Transit and King County Metro, as an incentive. In February 2010, however, Microsoft took a stance against adding additional public transport and high-occupancy vehicle (HOV) lanes to the State Route 520 and its floating bridge connecting Redmond to Seattle; the company did not want to delay the construction any further. Microsoft was ranked number 1 in the list of the World's Best Multinational Workplaces by the Great Place to Work Institute in 2011.

In January 2020, the company announced a strategy to take the company carbon negative by 2030 and to remove all carbon that it has emitted since its foundation in 1975. On October 9, 2020, Microsoft permanently allowed remote work. In January 2021, the company announced on Twitter to join the Climate Neutral Data Centre Pact, which engages the cloud infrastructure and data centers industries to reach carbon neutrality in Europe by 2030, and also disclosed an investment in Climeworks, a direct air capture company partnered with Carbfix for carbon sequestration. In the same year, it was awarded the EPA's Green Power Leadership Award, citing the company's all-renewable energy use since 2014.

In September 2023, Microsoft announced that it purchased $200 million in carbon credits to offset 315,000 metric tons of carbon dioxide over 10 years from Heirloom Carbon, a carbon removal company that mixes calcium oxide from heated crushed limestone with water to form carbon hydroxide to absorb carbon dioxide from the atmosphere to mineralize back into limestone while the released carbon dioxide is stored underground or injected into concrete. Despite spending spent more than $760 million through its Climate Innovation Fund by June 2024 on sustainability projects—including purchases of more than 5 million metric tonnes of carbon dioxide removal with carbon offsets and more than 34 megawatts of renewable energy—Microsoft's Scope 3 emissions had increased by 31% from the company's 2020 baseline, which caused the company's total emissions to rise by 29% in 2023.

In 2023, Microsoft consumed 24 TWh of electricity, more than countries such as Iceland, Ghana, the Dominican Republic, or Tunisia. In 2026, the Virginia Department of Environmental Quality fined Microsoft $2.5 million for violating air quality standards.

=== Headquarters ===
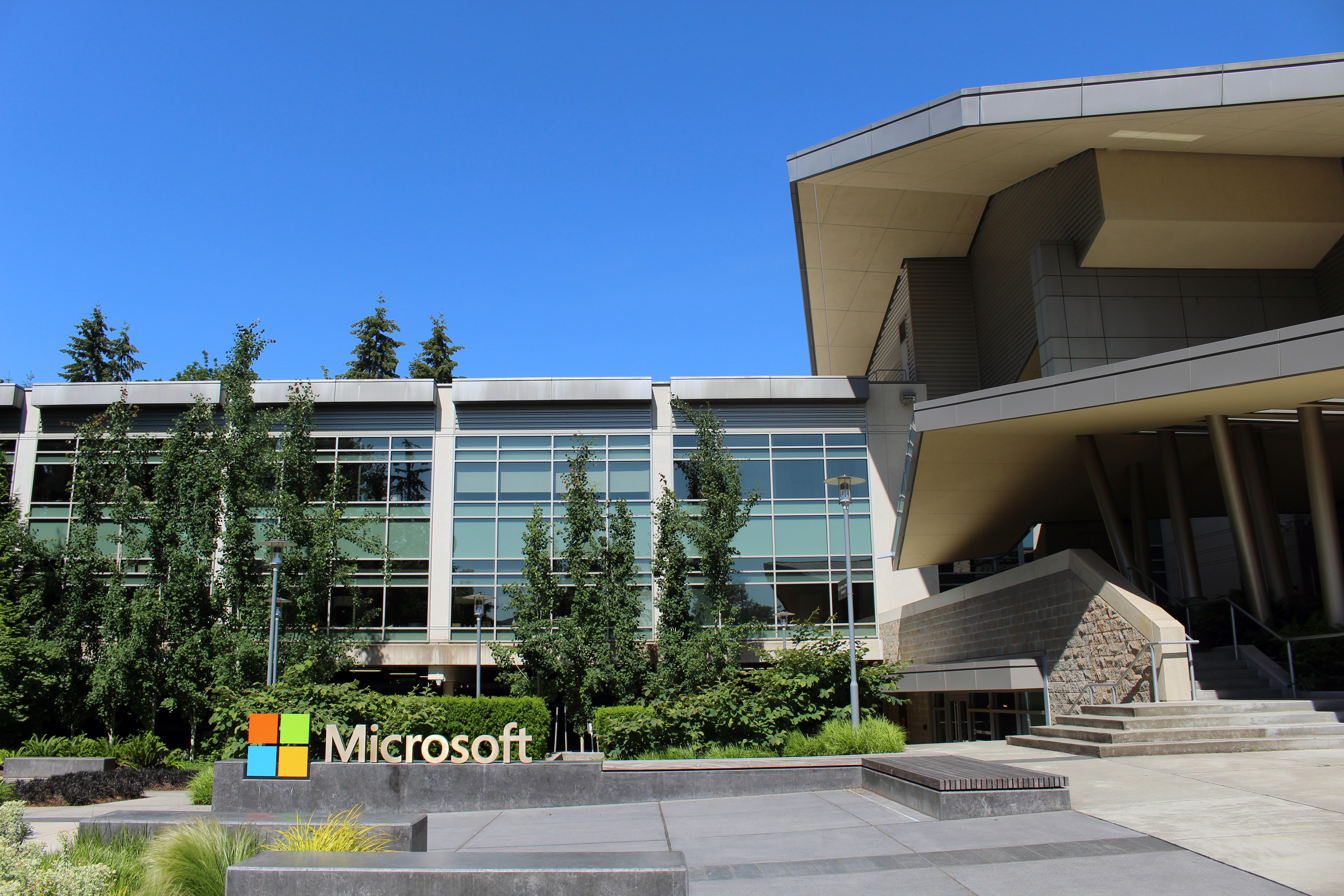
Building 92, home to the Microsoft Visitor Center

The corporate headquarters, informally known as the Microsoft Redmond campus, is located at One Microsoft Way in Redmond, Washington. Microsoft initially moved onto the grounds of the campus on February 26, 1986, weeks before the company went public on March 13. The headquarters has since experienced multiple expansions since its establishment. It is estimated to encompass over 8 million ft^{2} (750,000 m^{2}) of office space and 30,000–40,000 employees. Additional offices are located in Bellevue and Issaquah, Washington (90,000 employees worldwide). The company is planning to upgrade its Mountain View, California, campus on a grand scale. The company has occupied this campus since 1981. In 2016, the company bought the 32-acre (13 ha) campus, with plans to renovate and expand it by 25%. Microsoft operates an East Coast headquarters in Charlotte, North Carolina.

In April 2024, it was announced that Microsoft would be opening a state-of-the-art artificial intelligence 'hub' around Paddington in London, England. It was announced that the division would be led by Jordan Hoffman, who previously worked for Deepmind and Inflection.

=== Offices and development centers ===
Microsoft opened the India Development Center in Hyderabad in 1998, later adding sites in Bengaluru and Noida. In Dublin, more than 1,600 engineers work on Azure, Copilot and security software.

Microsoft's Prague development center has more than 1,000 engineers working on products such as Teams, Azure and Dynamics 365. Microsoft describes the Prague site as its largest engineering center in continental Europe.

=== Flagship stores ===
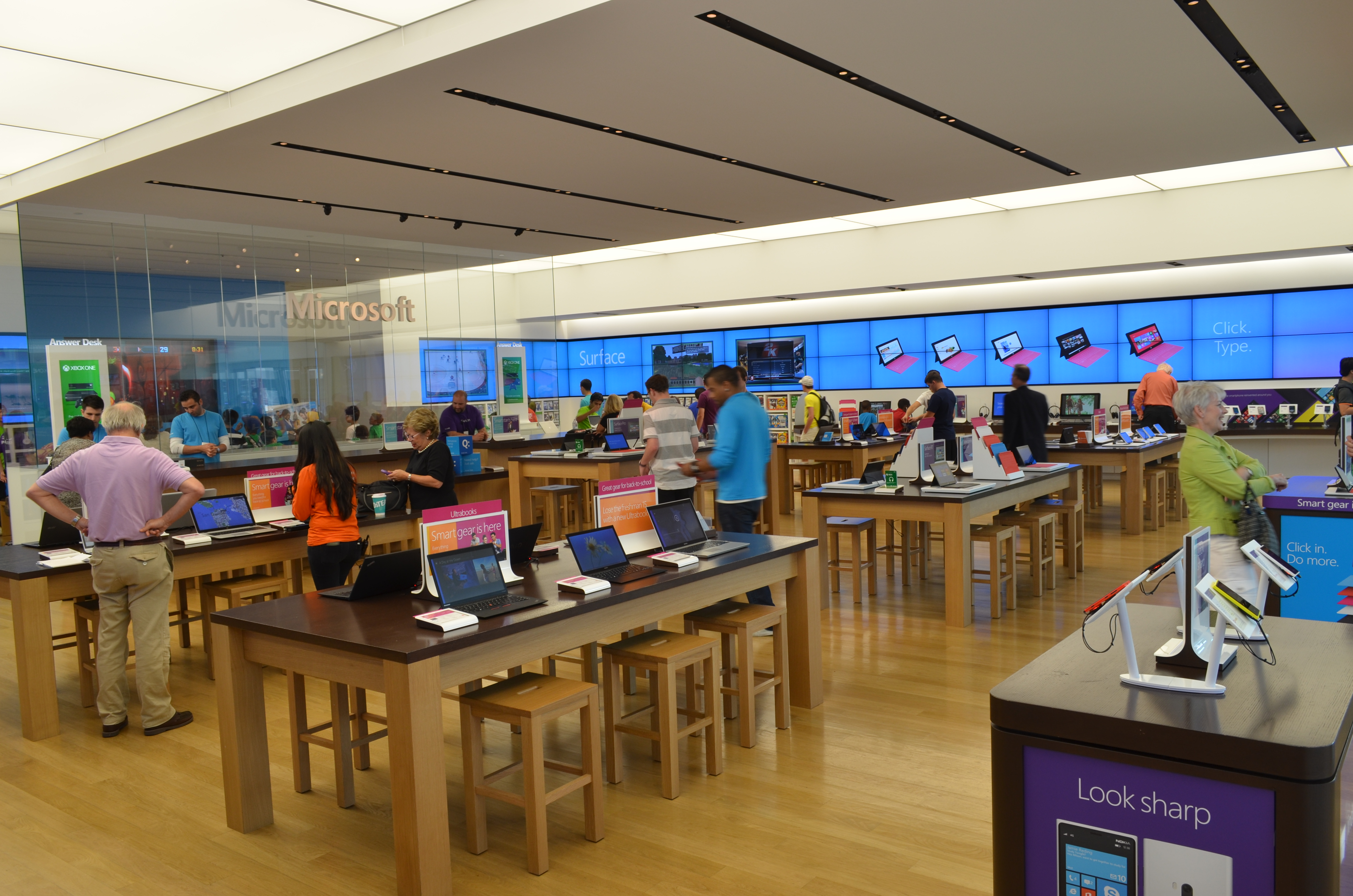
Microsoft's Toronto flagship store

On October 26, 2015, the company opened its retail location on Fifth Avenue in New York City. The location features a five-story glass storefront and is 22,270 square feet. As per company executives, Microsoft had been on the lookout for a flagship location since 2009. The company's retail locations are part of a greater strategy to help build a connection with its consumers. The opening of the store coincided with the launch of the Surface Book and Surface Pro 4. On November 12, 2015, Microsoft opened a second flagship store, located in Sydney's Pitt Street Mall.

=== Logo ===
Microsoft adopted the so-called "Pac-Man Logo", designed by Scott Baker, on February 26, 1987, with the concept being similar to InFocus Corporation logo that was adapted a year earlier in 1986. Baker stated "The new logo, in Helvetica italic typeface, has a slash between the o and s to emphasize the "soft" part of the name and convey motion and speed". Dave Norris ran an internal joke campaign to save the old logo, which was green, in all uppercase, and featured a fanciful letter O, nicknamed the blibbet, but it was discarded.

Microsoft's logo with the tagline "Your potential. Our passion."—below the main corporate name—is based on a slogan Microsoft used in 2008. In 2002, the company started using the logo in the United States and eventually started a television campaign with the slogan, changed from the previous tagline of "Where do you want to go today?" During the private MGX (Microsoft Global Exchange) conference in 2010, Microsoft unveiled the company's next tagline, "Be What's Next." It also had a slogan/tagline "Making it all make sense." The Microsoft Pac-Man logo was used for 25 years, 5 months, and 28 days until August 23, 2012, being the longest enduring logo to be used by the company.

On August 23, 2012, Microsoft unveiled a new corporate logo at the opening of its 23rd Microsoft store in Boston, indicating the company's shift of focus from the classic style to the tile-centric modern interface, which it uses/will use on the Windows Phone platform, Xbox 360, Windows 8 and the upcoming Office Suites. The new logo also includes four squares with the colors of the then-current Windows logo which have been used to represent Microsoft's four major products: Windows (blue), Office (orange), Xbox (green) and Bing (yellow). The logo also resembles the opening of one of the commercials for Windows 95.

Microsoft logo history

c. 1975 – 1980: First Microsoft logo.

1980 – June 25, 1982: Second Microsoft logo.

June 25, 1982 – February 26, 1987: Third Microsoft logo.

February 26, 1987 – August 23, 2012: Microsoft "Pac-Man" logo, designed by Scott Baker.

August 23, 2012 – present: Fifth and current Microsoft logo.

=== Sponsorship ===
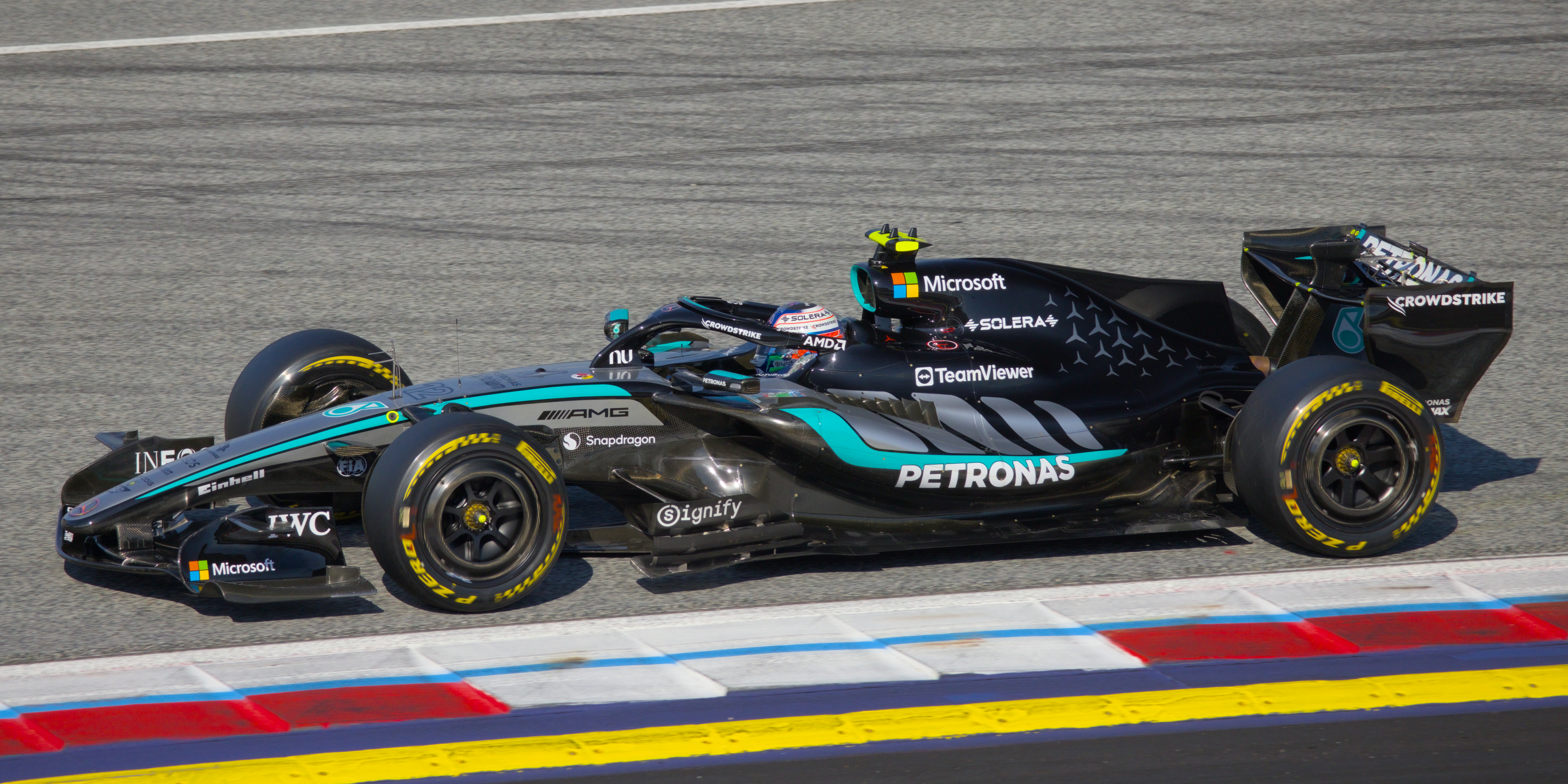
Kimi Antonelli driving the Mercedes W17 Formula One car at the 2026 Austrian Grand Prix. The Microsoft logo can be seen on the engine cover and front wing sidepods.

The company was the official jersey sponsor of Finland's national basketball team at EuroBasket 2015, a major sponsor of the Toyota Gazoo Racing WRT (2017–2020) and a sponsor of the Renault F1 Team (2016–2020). Currently, they sponsor the Mercedes AMG Petronas F1 Team (2026)

=== Lobbying and political influence ===
In 2025, Microsoft was one of the donors who funded the demolition of the East Wing of the White House and planned building of a ballroom.

=== Philanthropy ===
In 2015, Microsoft Philanthropies, an internal charitable organization, was established to bring the benefits of technology and the digital revolution to areas and groups that lack them. The organisation's key areas of focus are: donating cloud computing resources to university researchers and nonprofit groups; supporting the expansion of broadband access worldwide; funding international computer science education through YouthSpark; supporting tech education in the U.S. from kindergarten to high school; and donating to global child and refugee relief organizations.

During the COVID-19 pandemic, Microsoft's president, Brad Smith, announced that it had donated an initial batch of supplies, including 15,000 protection goggles, infrared thermometers, medical caps, and protective suits, to healthcare workers in Seattle, with further aid to come.

After the 2022 Russian invasion of Ukraine, Microsoft began monitoring cyberattacks originating from the government of Russia and Russia-backed hackers. In June 2022, Microsoft published the report on Russian cyber attacks and concluded that state-backed Russian hackers "have engaged in "strategic espionage" against governments, think tanks, businesses and aid groups" in 42 countries supporting Kyiv.

Microsoft also supports initiatives through its AI for Accessibility grant program, providing funding to various global organizations that create technologies to enhance accessibility for individuals with disabilities. Among grant recipients from the Asia-Pacific region are the Sri Lankan IT company Fortude, the Thailand-based Vulcan Coalition, and the Indonesian organization Kerjabilitas.

=== Controversies ===
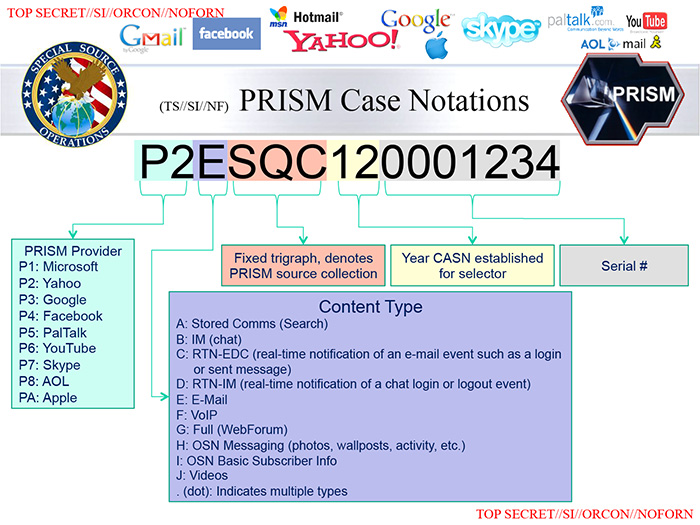
PRISM is a clandestine surveillance program under which the NSA collects user data from companies like Microsoft and Facebook.

Criticism of Microsoft has followed various aspects of its products and business practices, including surveillance of employees, "Velvet Sweatshop" practices, tax manipulation, and antitrust violations.

Frequently criticized are the ease of use, robustness, and security of the Microsoft's software. The company has also been criticized for the use of permatemp employees (employees employed for years as "temporary", and therefore without medical benefits), the use of forced retention tactics, which means that employees would be sued if they tried to leave. Historically, Microsoft has also been accused of overworking employees, in many cases, leading to burnout within just a few years of joining the company. The company is often referred to as a "Velvet Sweatshop", a term which originated in a 1989 Seattle Times article, and later became used to describe the company by some of Microsoft's own employees. This characterization is derived from the perception that Microsoft provides nearly everything for its employees in a convenient place, but in turn overworks them to a point where it would be bad for their (possibly long-term) health.

As reported by several news outlets, an Irish subsidiary of Microsoft based in the Republic of Ireland declared £220 bn in profits but paid no corporation tax for the year 2020. This is due to the company being tax resident in Bermuda as mentioned in the accounts for 'Microsoft Round Island One, a subsidiary that collects license fees from the use of Microsoft software worldwide. Dame Margaret Hodge, a Labour MP in the UK said, "It is unsurprising – yet still shocking – that massively wealthy global corporations openly, unashamedly and blatantly refuse to pay tax on the profits they make in the countries where they undertake business".

In 2020, ProPublica reported that the company had diverted more than $39 billion in U.S. profits to Puerto Rico using a mechanism structured to make it seem as if the company was unprofitable on paper. As a result, the company paid a tax rate on those profits of "nearly 0%". When the Internal Revenue Service audited these transactions, ProPublica reported that Microsoft aggressively fought back, including successfully lobbying Congress to change the law to make it harder for the agency to conduct audits of large corporations. In 2023, Microsoft reported in a securities filing that the U.S. Internal Revenue Service was alleging that the company owed the U.S. $28.9 billion in past taxes, plus penalties related to mis-allocation of corporate profits over a decade.

"Embrace, extend, and extinguish" (EEE), also known as "embrace, extend, and exterminate," is a phrase that the U.S. Department of Justice found that was used internally by Microsoft to describe its strategy for entering product categories involving widely used standards, extending those standards with proprietary capabilities, and then using those differences to strongly disadvantage competitors.

Microsoft was the first company to participate in the PRISM surveillance program, according to leaked NSA documents obtained by The Guardian and The Washington Post in June 2013, and acknowledged by government officials following the leak. The program authorizes the government to secretly access data of non-US citizens hosted by American companies without a warrant. Microsoft has denied participation in such a program.

In 2020, Salesforce, the manufacturer of the Slack platform, complained to European regulators about Microsoft due to the integration of the Teams service into Office 365. Negotiations with the European Commission continued until the summer of 2023, but reached an impasse that led to Microsoft facing an antitrust investigation from the European Union.

In June 2024, Microsoft faced a potential EU fine after regulators accused it of abusing market power by bundling its Teams video-conferencing app with its Office 365 and Microsoft 365 software. The European Commission issued a statement of objections, alleging Microsoft's practice since 2019 gave Teams an unfair market advantage and limited interoperability with competing software. This action followed a 2019 complaint from Slack, which was later acquired by Salesforce. Microsoft's Teams usage soared during the pandemic, growing from 2 million daily users in 2017 to 300 million in 2023. The company has a history of antitrust battles in the U.S. and Europe, with over €2 billion in EU fines previously imposed for similar abuses.

In November 2024, the Federal Trade Commission (FTC) launched an investigation into Microsoft, focusing on potential antitrust violations related to its cloud computing, AI, and cybersecurity businesses. The probe scrutinized Microsoft's bundling of cloud services with products like Office and security tools, as well as its growing AI presence through its partnership with OpenAI. This inquiry was part of broader efforts by the U.S. government to enforce guidelines on the power of major tech companies. Concerns were raised about Microsoft's licensing practices potentially locking customers into its services and its AI investments possibly sidestepping regulatory oversight.

==== Involvement in the Gaza war ====
Microsoft Azure is one of multiple cloud computing services used for data storage by the Israel Defense Forces (IDF). The IDF's usage of Azure intensified during the Gaza war and genocide, doubling its stored data to over 13.6 petabytes from March to July 2024. In June 2025, a UN expert's report named Microsoft as being "central to Israel's surveillance apparatus and the ongoing Gaza destruction." In late 2025, a non-profit organization filed a complaint within the European Union, raising concerns about Microsoft’s handling of certain data related to Israeli military surveillance. According to the complaint and media reports, Microsoft’s cloud services may have been used to store or process surveillance-related data. The organization requested that European data protection authorities investigate whether this data processing complies with EU law. In August 2025 a joint investigation by The Guardian, +972 Magazine, and Local Call reported that Microsoft Azure provides storage for mass-surveilled Palestinian phone calls to identify bombing targets in Gaza. In September, in response to the investigation, Microsoft announced it had ended Azure access for the intelligence-focused Unit 8200 of the IDF.

In June 2025 Microsoft helped suspend the email account of Karim Ahmad Khan, a British International Criminal Court (ICC) prosecutor in the Netherlands who was investigating Israel for war crimes. Microsoft was complying with a Trump executive order titled "Imposing Sanctions on the International Criminal Court". According to The New York Times, Microsoft's rapid compliance with the order, targeting an allied country, concerned European officials, and was seen as a symptom of the worsening relations between the U.S. and EU.

In October 2024, Microsoft fired two employees, software engineer Hossam Nasr and data scientist Abdo Mohamed, who organized an unauthorized vigil at its Redmond headquarters to honor Palestinians killed in the Gaza war. The employees, part of the group No Azure for Apartheid, sought to address the company's involvement in the Israeli government's use of its technology. In February 2025, the Associated Press reported that the Israeli military was utilizing Microsoft-developed artificial intelligence tools in its military and intelligence operations against the people of Gaza. In May 2025, Microsoft issued an unsigned statement confirming that these services had been made available to Israel, while denying that these tools were employed during the massacre of the people of Gaza. On March 20, 2025, before an event at Seattle's Great Hall with Brad Smith and Steve Ballmer, protestors projected "Microsoft powers genocide" on the wall. Subsequently, two employees, software engineers Ibtihal Aboussad and Vaniya Agrawal, interrupted AI executive Mustafa Suleyman at a speaking event on April 4, 2025, in protest at the company's support of Israel. After the disruptions at these events, Microsoft contacted the FBI in search of assistance in surveilling its pro-Palestinian employees and their allies. The Boycott, Divestment and Sanctions movement added Microsoft to its list of targets for partnering "with the apartheid regime of Israel and its prison system". On August 20, 20 Microsoft employees and their allies were arrested after refusing to disperse from a protest on Microsoft's Redmond, Washington campus.

== See also ==
- Microsoft and open source
- Microsoft engineering groups
- Microsoft Enterprise Agreement
- Private equity in the 2020s
