= QVD =

QVD may refer to:

- QVD, Quietly Vesting Disease
- QVD (software), a Linux open source VDI platform
- .QVD (QlikView dashboard default extension), QlikView is a dashboard BI tool
