= Mustafa Suleyman =

British AI entrepreneur (born 1984)

Mustafa Suleyman CBE
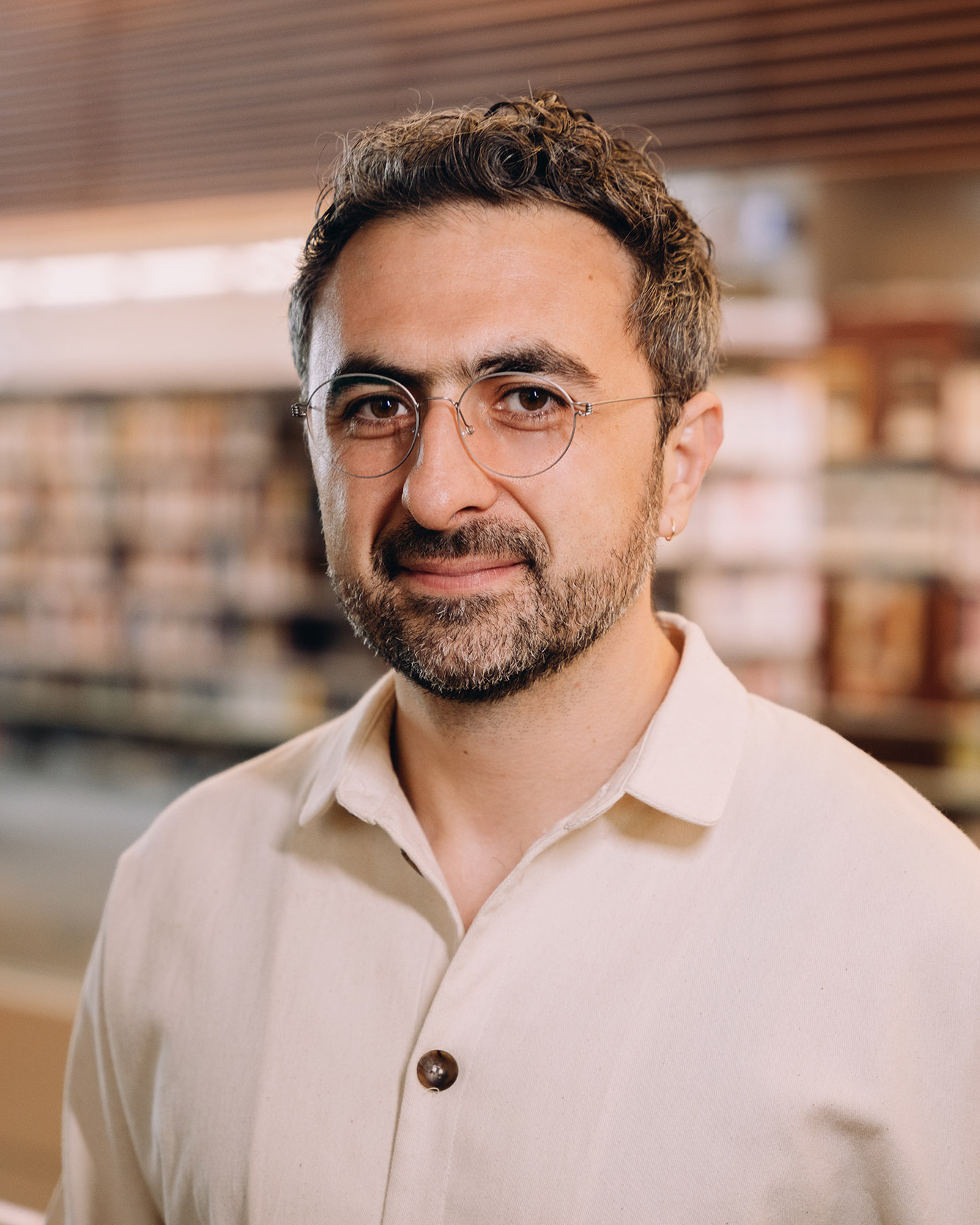
- Suleyman in 2018
- Born: August 1984 (age 42); London, England
- Education: Queen Elizabeth's School, Barnet; University of Oxford (dropped out)
- Occupation: Entrepreneur
- Known for: Artificial intelligence
- Scientific career
- Workplaces: DeepMind; Google; Inflection AI; Microsoft
- Website: mustafa-suleyman.ai

Mustafa Suleyman CBE (born in August 1984) is a British artificial intelligence (AI) entrepreneur. He is the CEO of Microsoft AI, and the co-founder and former head of applied AI at DeepMind, an AI company which was acquired by Google. After leaving DeepMind, he co-founded Inflection AI, a machine learning and generative AI company, in 2022.

== Early life and education ==
Suleyman's Syrian father worked as a taxi driver and his English mother was a nurse. He grew up off Caledonian Road, London, where he lived with his parents and his two younger brothers.

Suleyman went to Thornhill Primary School, a state school in Islington, followed by Queen Elizabeth's School, Barnet, a boys' grammar school. Around that time, he met his DeepMind co-founder, Demis Hassabis, through his best friend, who was Demis's younger brother. Suleyman shared that he and Hassabis often discussed how they could make a positive impact on the world. Suleyman enrolled to study philosophy and theology at the University of Oxford where he was an undergraduate student at Mansfield College, Oxford, before dropping out at 19.

== Career ==
In August 2001, while still a teenager and a "strong atheist", Suleyman helped Mohammed Mamdani establish a telephone counselling service called the Muslim Youth Helpline. The organization would later become one of the largest mental health support services.

Suleyman subsequently worked as a policy officer on human rights for Ken Livingstone, the Mayor of London, before going on to start Reos Partners, a "systemic change" consultancy that uses methods from conflict resolution to navigate social problems. As a negotiator and facilitator, Mustafa worked for a wide range of clients such as the United Nations, the Dutch government, and the World Wide Fund for Nature.

=== DeepMind and Google ===
In 2010 Suleyman co-founded DeepMind Technologies, an artificial intelligence (AI) and machine learning company, and became its chief product officer. The company quickly established itself as one of the leaders in the AI sector.

In 2014 DeepMind was acquired by Google for a reported £400 million, the company's largest acquisition in Europe at that time. Following the acquisition, Suleyman became head of applied AI at DeepMind, taking on responsibility for integrating the company's technology across a wide range of Google products.

In February 2016 Suleyman launched DeepMind Health at the Royal Society of Medicine. DeepMind Health builds clinician-led technology for the National Health Service (NHS) and other partners to improve frontline healthcare services. Under Suleyman, DeepMind also developed research collaborations with healthcare organizations in the United Kingdom, including Moorfields Eye Hospital NHS foundation trust.

In 2016, Suleyman led an effort to apply DeepMind's machine learning algorithms to help reduce the energy required to cool Google's data centres. The system evaluated the billions of possible combinations of actions that the data centre operators could take, and came up with recommendations based on the predicted power usage. The system discovered novel methods of cooling, leading to a reduction of up to 40% of the amount of energy used for cooling, and a 15% improvement in the buildings' overall energy efficiency.

Since June 2019, Suleyman has served on the board of The Economist Group, which publishes The Economist newspaper.

In August 2019, Suleyman was placed on administrative leave following allegations of bullying employees. The company hired an external lawyer to investigate, and shortly thereafter Suleyman left to take a VP role at parent company Google. An email circulated by DeepMind's leadership to staff after the story broke, as well as additional details published by Business Insider, said Suleyman's "management style fell short" of expected standards.

In December 2019, Suleyman announced he would be leaving DeepMind to join Google, working in a policy role.

=== Inflection AI ===
Suleyman left Google in January 2022 and joined Greylock Partners as a venture partner and in March 2022, Suleyman co-founded Inflection AI, a new AI lab venture with Greylock's Reid Hoffman. The company was founded with the goal of leveraging "AI to help humans 'talk' to computers", recruited former staff from companies such as Google and Meta and raised $225 million in its first funding round.

In 2023, Inflection AI launched a chatbot named “Pi” for Personal Intelligence. The bot “remembers” past conversations and seems to get to know its users over time. According to Suleyman, the long-term goal for Pi is to be a digital “Chief of Staff”, with the initial design focused on maintaining conversational dialogue with users, asking questions, and offering emotional support.

=== Microsoft AI ===
In March 2024, Microsoft appointed Suleyman as Executive Vice President (EVP) and CEO of its newly created consumer AI unit, Microsoft AI. Several members of Inflection AI's team were also appointed to the division, including co-founder Karen Simonyan.

=== Awards and honours ===
Suleyman was appointed a Commander of the British Empire (CBE) in the 2019 New Year Honours. Suleyman was named by Time as one of the 100 most influential people in artificial intelligence in 2023 and in 2024.

=== Views on AI ethics ===
Suleyman has spoken about the need for companies, governments and civil society to join in holding technologists accountable for the impacts of their work. He has advocated redesigning incentives in the technology industry to steer business leaders toward prioritising social responsibility alongside their fiduciary duties. Within DeepMind he set up a research unit called DeepMind Ethics & Society to study the real-world impacts of AI and help technologists put ethics into practice.

Suleyman is also a founding co-chair of the Partnership on AI – an organisation that includes representatives from companies such as Amazon, Apple, DeepMind, Meta, Google, IBM, and Microsoft. The organisation studies and formulates best practices for AI technologies, advances the public's understanding of AI, and serves as an open platform for discussion and engagement about AI and how it affects people and society. Its board of directors has equal representation from non-profit and for profit entities.

In September 2023, Suleyman, in collaboration with researcher Michael Bhaskar, published The Coming Wave, Technology, Power and the 21st Century's Greatest Dilemma, a book that examines the transformative and potentially perilous impact of advanced technologies, particularly AI and synthetic biology. According to Suleyman, AI notably has the potential to bring "radical abundance", address climate change and empower people with its cheap problem-solving capabilities. But it may also improve its own design and manufacturing processes, leading to a period of dangerously rapid AI progress. And it could enable catastrophic misuse, from bioengineered pathogens to autonomous weapons, making global oversight and containment essential to avoid unintended consequences. It was shortlisted for the 2023 Financial Times Business Book of the Year Award.

In June 2024, in an interview with Andrew Ross Sorkin at the Aspen Ideas Festival, Suleyman expressed the view that unless a website explicitly specifies otherwise, for "content that is already on the open web, the social contract of that content since the 90s has been that it is fair use. Anyone can copy it, recreate with it, reproduce with it. That has been freeware, if you like. That's been the understanding." The statement sparked controversy over the use of Internet data for training AI models.

== Personal life ==
A Business Insider profile in 2017 described Suleyman as being liberal.
