= FYIFV =

Jargon phrase among Microsoft employees

FYIFV (standing for "Fuck You, I'm Fully Vested") or FYIV is a piece of early Microsoft jargon that has become an urban legend: the claim that employees whose stock options were fully vested (that is, could be exercised) would occasionally wear T-shirts or buttons with the initials "FYIFV" to indicate they were sufficiently financially independent to give their honest opinions and leave any time they wished.

In internal usage at Microsoft, it was meant metaphorically to describe intransigent co-workers. In press usage and popular culture, it was used to imply a predatory business culture reaching even to the programmers. Despite many third hand reports of Microsoft employees wearing "FYIFV" buttons or shirts, there is only one report of an actual "FYIFV" T-shirt, worn on the wearer's last day at the company.

== Origins of the phrase ==
An option allows the holder to buy the stock at a later date for the price at which the option was originally granted. Many Microsoft full-time employees were granted stock options at the start of their employment. The options vested gradually over four and a half years. Because Microsoft's stock price rose significantly between September 1986 and January 2000 and split 8 times in that period, an employee could buy the stock cheap and sell it at a considerable profit, thus reducing or removing their dependence on their Microsoft salary. Many stayed at Microsoft nevertheless because they enjoyed their work.

Adam Barr, author of the book Proudly Serving My Corporate Masters, tracked down a possible origin for the urban legend:

... he made a comment to the effect that some person was wearing their FYIFV T-Shirt that day, meaning that that person was being intransigent about something or other. The intended audience apparently understood that this was an entirely metaphorical reference, but someone else, not involved in the conversation, apparently overheard the crack and related it to Bill [Gates], mis-reporting the story by saying that [Person X] had actually made such a T-Shirt ...

I only ever saw one actual FYIFV shirt. The person made it themself and wore it only on their final day at MS. This was maybe '92 or so, years after the original incident.

Barr notes also that further options were granted each year, thus an employee could never have been "fully vested."

== "FYIFV" in popular culture ==
The first third-party note of the term appears to be by Paul Andrews in the Seattle Times in 1989, in the context of Microsoft as a place where hard work and long hours were expected and rewarded:

Stock options during the company's early growth produced numerous wealthy sub-30-year-olds, and for a while buttons showed up on lapels bearing the inscription FYIFV, standing for "F--- You, I'm Fully Vested."

Andrews used the term again when coauthoring the book Gates with Stephen Manes in 1993.

The quote became more common as Microsoft's fortunes rose, used with the implication that alleged predatory business attitudes reached even to the programmers:

Accusations that Microsoft's people lie, cheat and steal information are as much a part of the company's lore as its cadre of millionaires with FYIFV ('.... I'm fully vested') buttons.

The phrase was also used with the implication that Microsoft employees were motivated only by money, rather than software quality, e.g. in a 2000 Wired article on United States v. Microsoft:

For years, Softies were wont to sport buttons that read FYIFV: Fuck You, I'm Fully Vested.

== Related phrases ==
Ken Barnes' Microsoft Lexicon notes also the term "QVD," or "Quietly Vesting Disease": the loss of enthusiasm of an employee as they approach or pass their vesting date.
