= Inflection AI =

Artificial intelligence company

Inflection AI, Inc.
- Type: Private
- Industry: Artificial intelligence
- Founded: 2022; 4 years ago
- Founders: Reid Hoffman; Mustafa Suleyman; Karén Simonyan
- Headquarters: Palo Alto, California, U.S.
- Key people: Sean White (CEO)
- Products: Pi
- Number of employees: 70 (2024)
- Website: inflection.ai

Inflection AI, Inc. is an American technology company which has developed machine learning and generative artificial intelligence hardware and apps, founded in 2022. The company is structured as a public benefit corporation and is headquartered in Palo Alto, California.

== History ==
The company was founded by entrepreneurs Reid Hoffman, Mustafa Suleyman and Karén Simonyan in 2022. The company has collaborated with Nvidia to develop hardware for generative artificial intelligence.

In June 2023, the company raised US$1.3 billion at $4 billion valuation.

In March 2024, Suleyman and Simonyan announced their departure from the company in order to start Microsoft AI, with Microsoft acqui-hiring nearly the entirety of its 70-person workforce. As part of the deal, Microsoft paid Inflection $650 million to license its technology. The proceeds were used to reimburse Inflection AI's investors. UK's Competition and Markets Authority launched a preliminary probe into the deal to examine the impact on competition and whether the agreement constituted a merger. The regulator concluded that the deal amounted to a "merger situation," but did not pose a threat to competition due to Inflection's small share in the UK consumer market.

== Products ==
The first product released widely by Inflection AI is a chatbot, Pi, named for “personal intelligence,” that is intended to function as an artificial intelligence-based personal assistant. Among the user experience goals that the company has stated for the Pi product are: providing an experience of emotional support for human users, in which the chatbot should be able to maintain an interactive text or voice-based dialogue with a human user that includes elements of kindness, a diplomatic tone about sensitive topics, and humor. Comparisons and contrasts have been made between the Pi chatbot and ChatGPT, a chatbot created by OpenAI.
