= Dollis Hill =

Area of London

Coordinates: 51.5641°N 0.2341°W

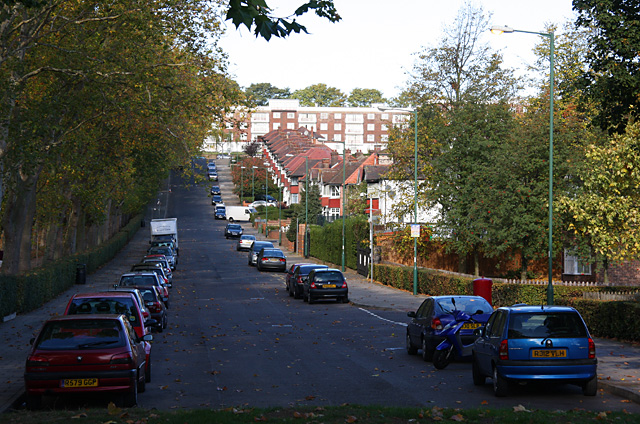
- Park Side, which runs down from Dollis Hill Lane beside Gladstone Park

- Location within Greater London
- Population: 14,425 (2011 Census. Ward)
- OS grid reference: TQ225865
- London borough: Brent
- Ceremonial county: Greater London
- Region: London
- Country: England
- Sovereign state: United Kingdom
- Post town: LONDON
- Postcode district: NW2, NW10
- Dialling code: 020
- Police: Metropolitan
- Fire: London
- Ambulance: London
- UK Parliament: Brent East
- London Assembly: Brent and Harrow

Dollis Hill is a locality in northwest London, which consists of the streets surrounding the 35 hectares (86 acres) Gladstone Park. It is served by a London Underground station, Dollis Hill, on the Jubilee line, providing good links to central London. It is in the London Borough of Brent, close to Willesden Green, Neasden and Cricklewood, and is in the postal districts of NW2 and NW10

The area is mainly residential (Edwardian terraced and 1920s/30s semi-detached houses) with a restaurant, greengrocer and convenience stores near the underground station. The Dollis Hill ward has the highest Irish population in London.

Dollis Hill played a part in the Second World War as the code-breaking computer used at Bletchley Park was built at the Post Office Research Station in Dollis Hill and the rarely used alternative Cabinet War Room bunker for Winston Churchill's government was dug underground here.

== History ==
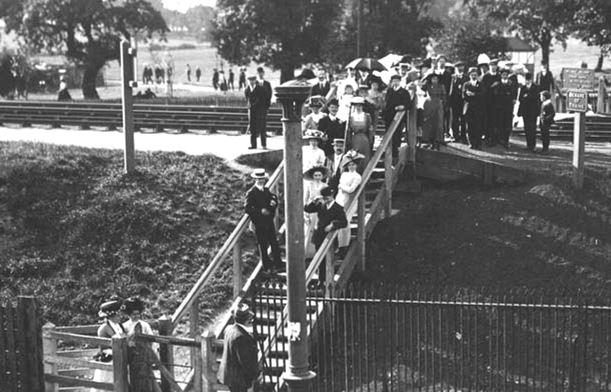
Crossing the Dudding Hill Line in late Victorian times, near the eastern end of Dudding Hill station, and at the western end of Gladstone Park

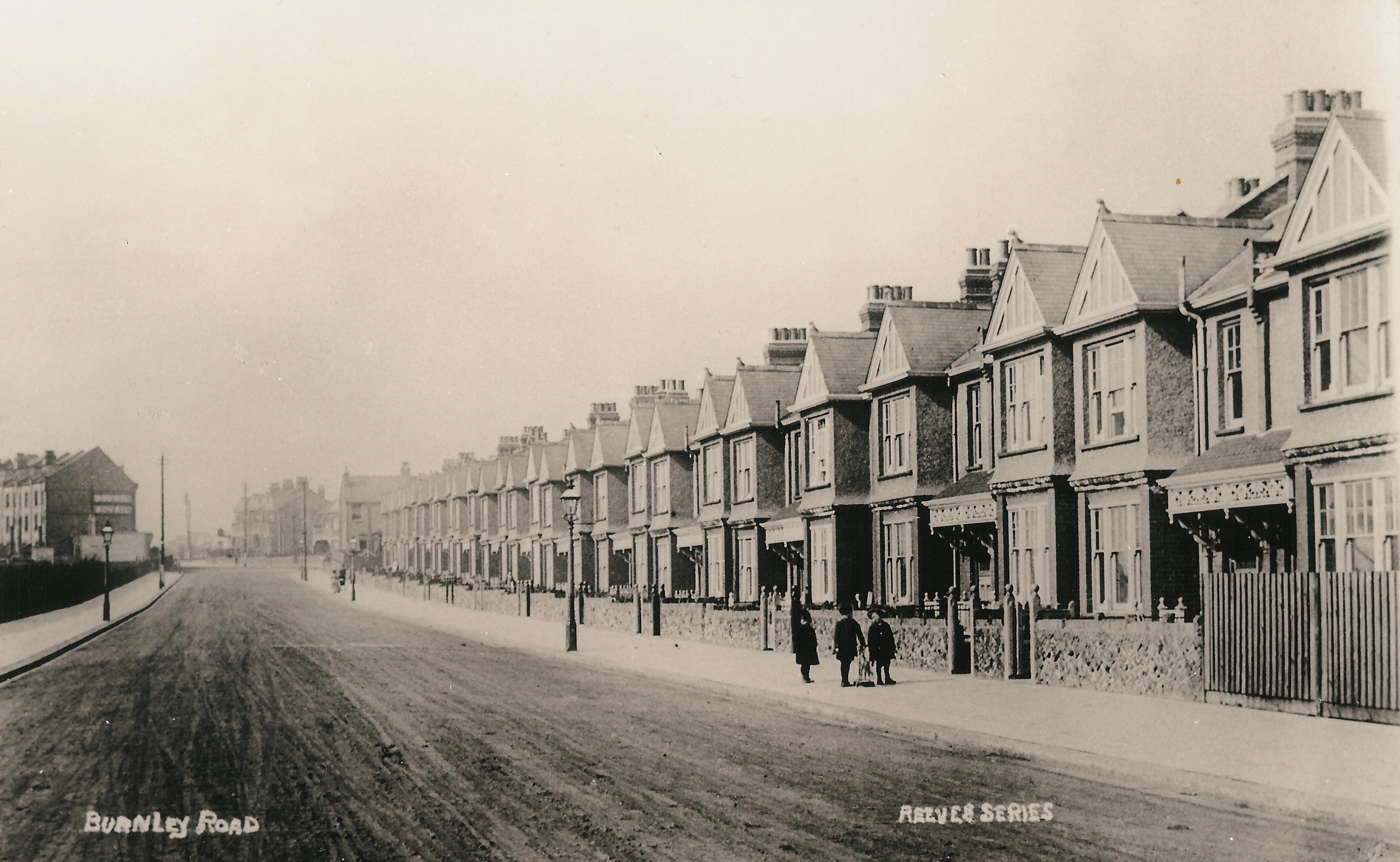
Burnley Road c. 1905

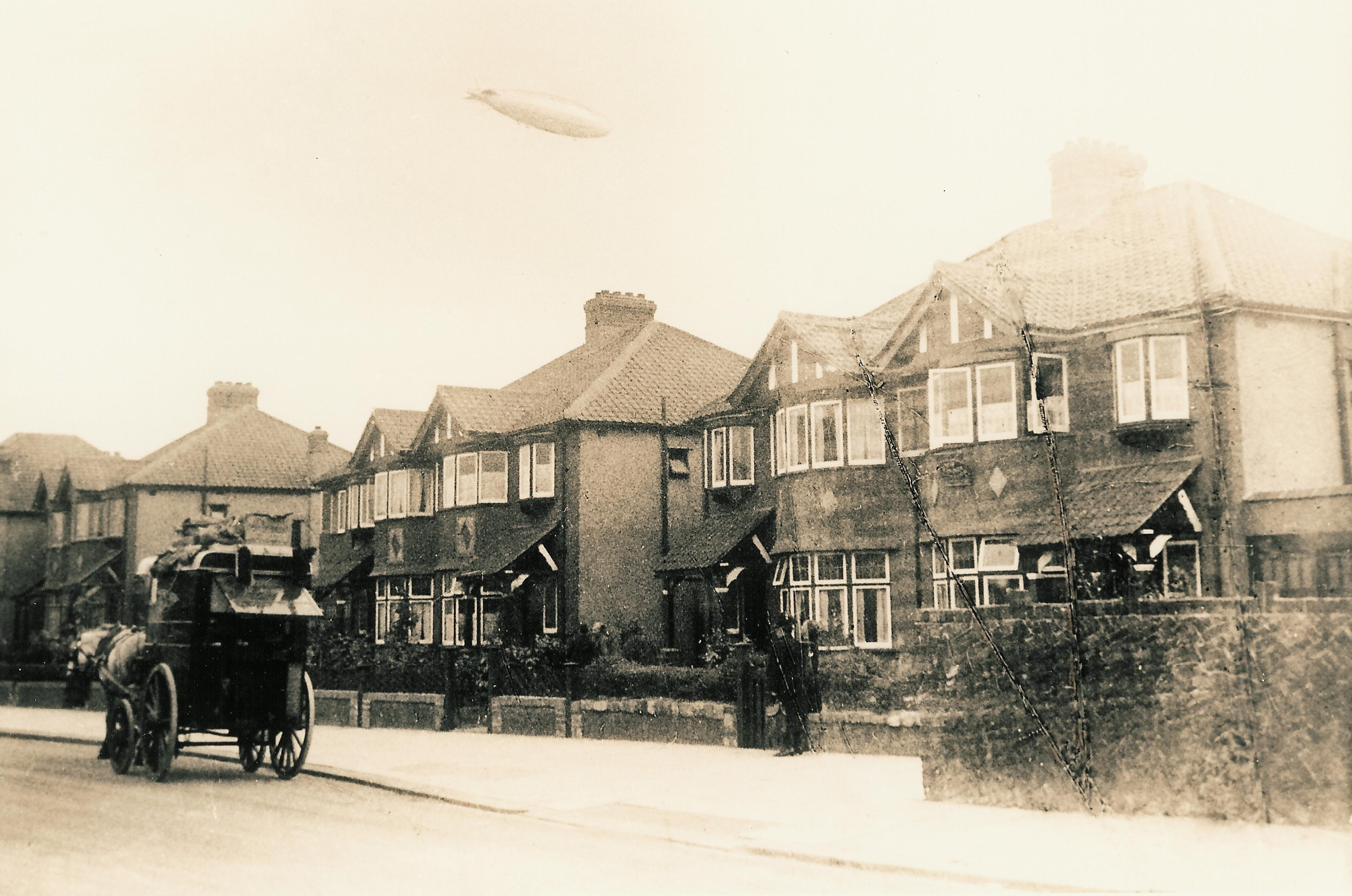
Burnley Road c. 1915 with airship flying overhead

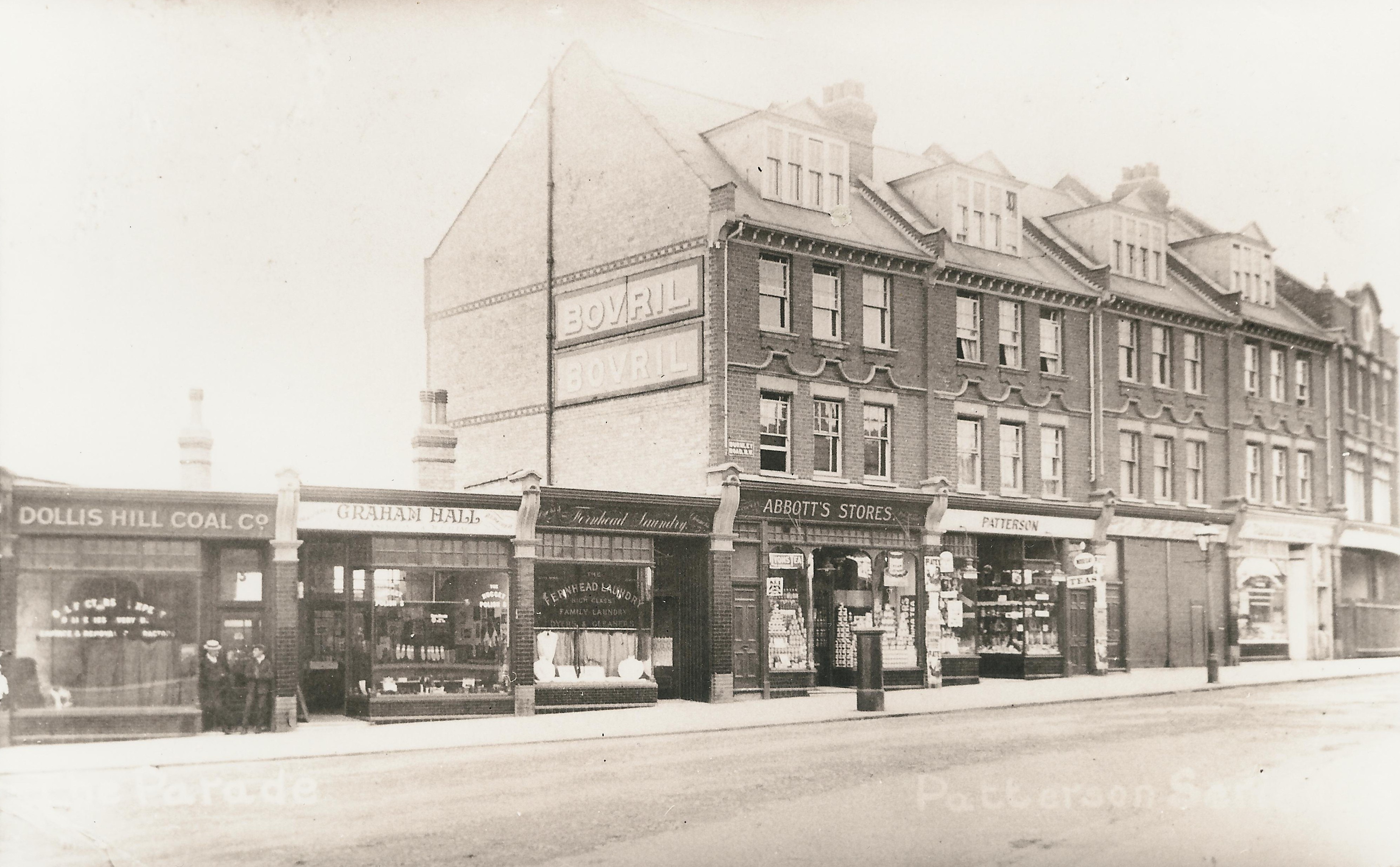
Shops at top of Burnley Road c. 1910

The Dollis Hill Estate was formed in the early 19th century, when the Finch family bought up a number of farms in the area to form a single estate. Dollis Hill House itself was built in the 1820s. It was later occupied by Lord Aberdeen who often had Prime Minister William Ewart Gladstone to stay as a guest.

In 1901, a new public park was created the 35 hectares (86 acres) Gladstone Park, named after the former Prime Minister. An underground station, Dollis Hill Underground station, was opened on 1 October 1909 as part of the Metropolitan line, now on the Jubilee line. Between the park and the underground station, Edwardian terraced houses were built at this time on a grid with names starting with letters in alphabetical order (with some letters missing) from Aberdeen to Normanby.

The first railway in the area was the Dudding Hill Line, opened in 1875 by the Midland Railway to connect its Midland Main Line and Cricklewood goods yard in the east to other lines to the southwest. The Dudding Hill railway station on the line closed for passengers in 1902, but the line still carried freight.

In World War I, between 1917 and 1921, the tank design team (The Mechanical Warfare Supply Department of the Ministry of Munitions) responsible for the new Anglo-American or Liberty tank, Mark VIII was located here. Early trials of some of the first military tanks were conducted in Dollis Hill. Images of the tanks in Dollis Hill are held at The Imperial War Museum, London.

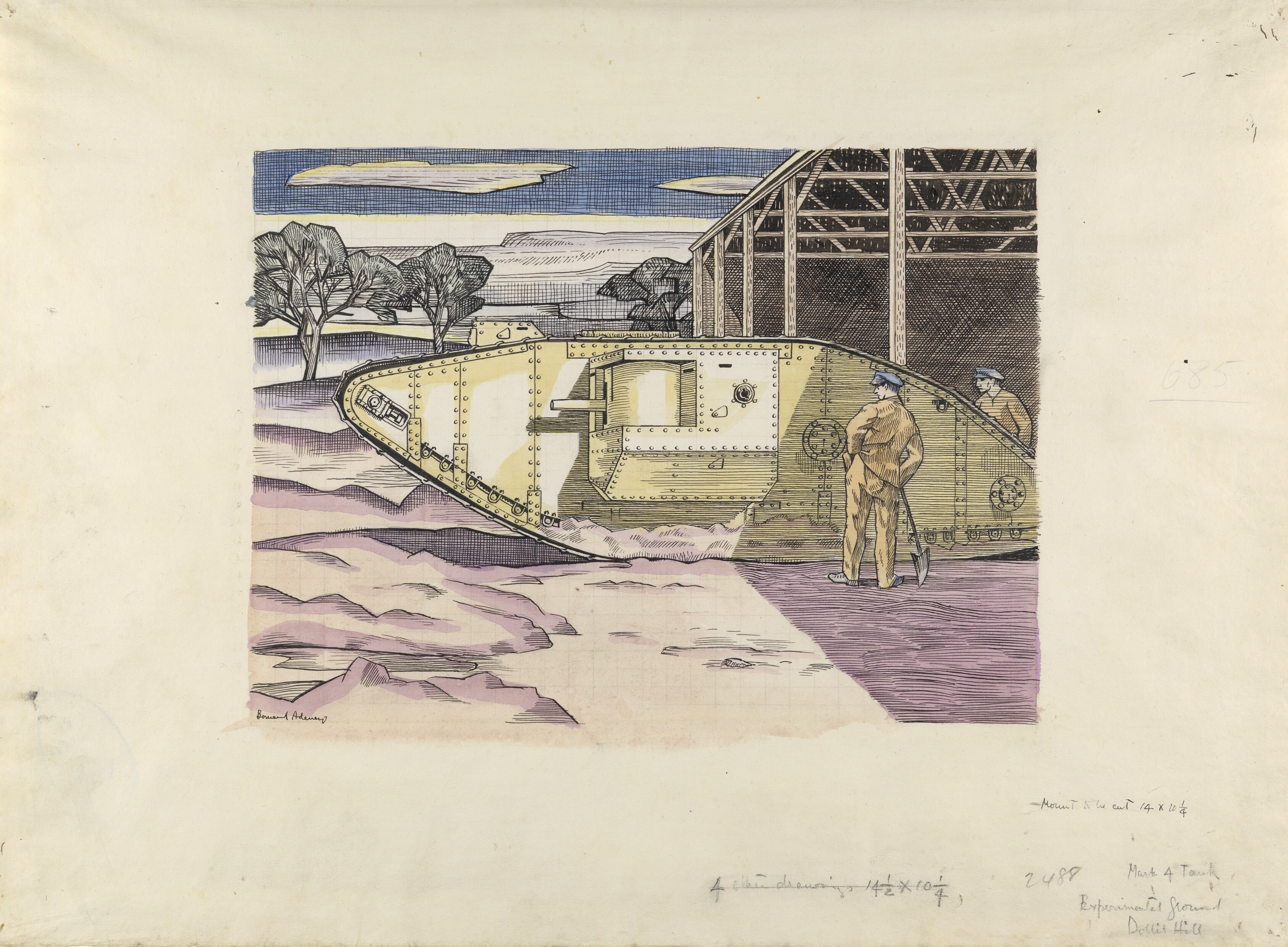
A Mark Iv Tank - the Experimental Ground, Dollis Hill, London, N.w. Art.IWMART2488

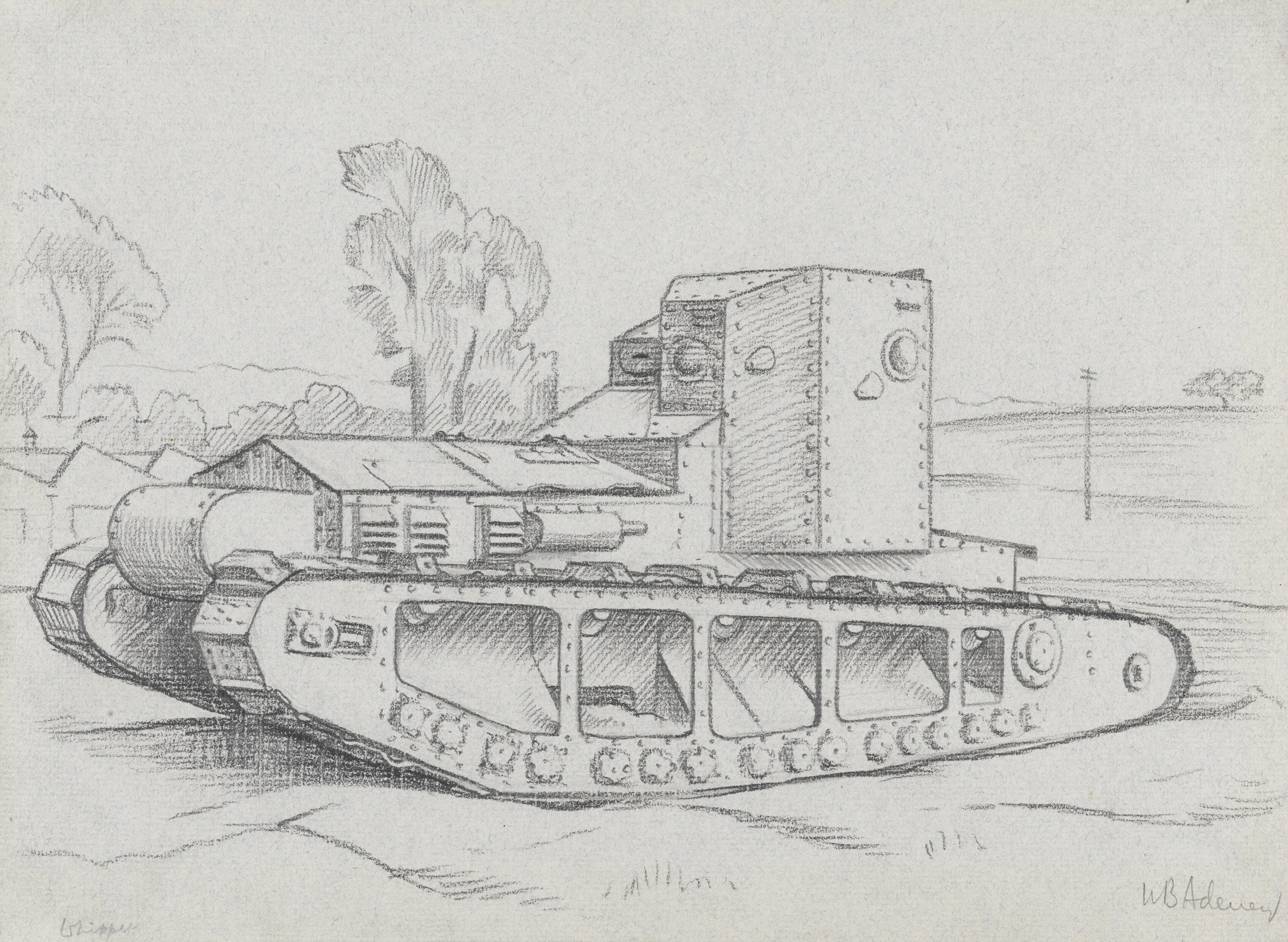
A Whippet Tank at the Dollis Hill Experimental Ground Art.IWMART3888

The Post Office Research Station was built in 1921. The code-breaking Colossus computer, used at Bletchley Park during the Second World War, was built at here by a team led by Tommy Flowers. The station was relocated to Martlesham Heath at the end of the 1970s. The Post Office Research Station building has now been converted into 62 flats and is now known as 'Chartwell Court', with an access road called 'Flowers Close'.

The alternative Cabinet War Room bunker for Winston Churchill's World War II government code-named Paddock is located under a corner of the former Post Office Research Station in Brook Road.

Medium-sized, semi-detached houses were built to the east of this area between 1927 and 1935.

The Grunwick dispute in the late 1970s concerned trade union recognition, working conditions and employment law. It centred on the Grunwick Film Processing Laboratories in Chapter Road, Dollis Hill. The protracted dispute became a cause célèbre in the trade union movement at the time, with several acrimonious interactions between large numbers of police and mass pickets.

== Demographics ==
Dollis Hill has a very diverse mix of ethnicities and nationalities. The largest single ethnic group in the Dollis Hill ward of the 2011 Census, White British, comprises 14.3% of the population. The next largest are Other White (13.7%), Indians (11.4%) and Black Africans (10.6%).

44.6% of people living in Dollis Hill were born in England in the 2011 census. The next most common countries of birth were Ireland (5.1%), India (4.3%), Pakistan (4%) and Somalia (3.9%).

The main religious affiliations of Dollis Hill are Christians (43.9%), Muslims (31.3%), and Hindus (10.1%).

== Transport ==
The area is served by a London Underground station, Dollis Hill, on the Jubilee line. There are regular services to Baker Street in 15 minutes and Westminster in 20 minutes. It is in London fare zone 3, three stops from West Hampstead and within easy reach of Wembley Stadium.

London Buses routes 226, 302 and N98 serve the area south of Gladstone Park. The area north of Gladstone Park is served by routes 182, 232, 245 and 332. There are a large number of buses that service nearby Willesden Green.

== Politics and government ==
Dollis Hill is part of the Brent East constituency for elections to the House of Commons of the United Kingdom, currently represented by Dawn Butler from the Labour Party.

Dollis Hill is part of the Dollis Hill ward for elections to Brent London Borough Council.

== Notable residents ==
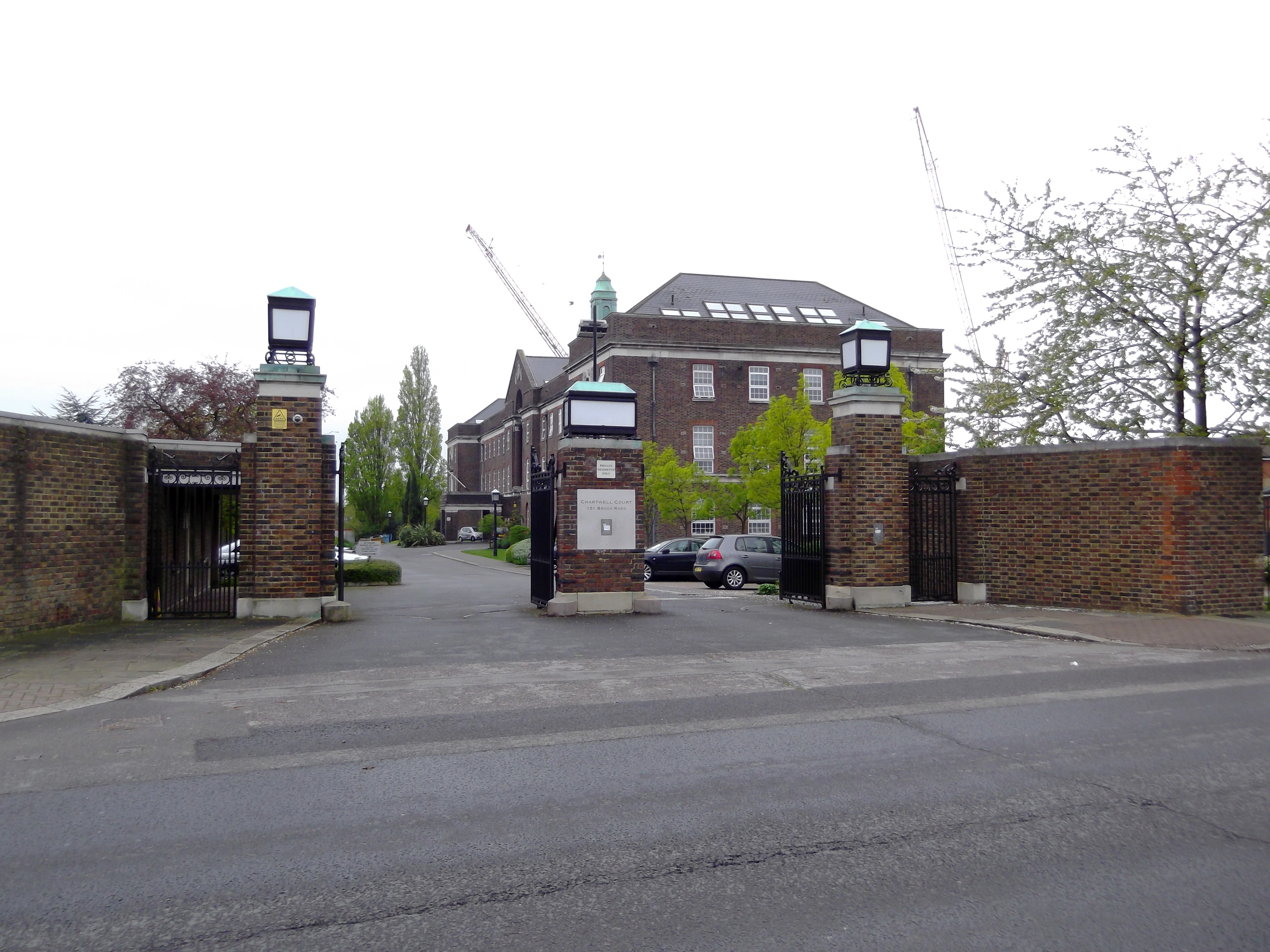
Chartwell Court, off Brook Road

- William Ewart Gladstone, the British Prime Minister, was a frequent visitor to Dollis Hill House in the late 19th century. The year after his death, 1899, Willesden Council acquired much of the Dollis Hill Estate for use as a public park, which was named Gladstone Park.
- Mark Twain stayed in Dollis Hill House in the summer of 1900. He wrote "Dollis Hill comes nearer to being a paradise than any other home I ever occupied."
- Eric Simms, the ornithologist, broadcaster and author, lived in Brook Road. His book, Birds of Town and Suburb (1975), was based on his studies of the birds in Dollis Hill.
- David Baddiel grew up in the area.
- Nihal Arthanayake, BBC Radio 5 Live DJ, resides here with his family.
- Mark Gottsche, London county team Gaelic footballer, lived on Chapter Road between 2012 and 2019.
- Ken Livingstone former MP and Mayor of London.

== In popular culture ==
Next to Dollis Hill tube station was home to both The Future Sound of London's Earthbeat and 4 Hero's recording studios during the 1990s.

== Fictional references ==
The fictional Dollis Hill Football Club features occasionally in the British satirical magazine Private Eye as arch-rivals to Neasden Football Club, with on at least one occasion the fictional Dollis Hill South council ward used in the irregular Those Election Results In Full mock section.

George Bowling, hero of George Orwell's novel Coming Up for Air, lives in Ellesmere Road.
