= Dudding =

Dudding may refer to:

- Dudding (surname)
- Dudding Hill Line, a railway line in north-west London, UK
- Dudding Hill railway station on the Dudding Hill Line
