= Jerusha (given name) =

Jerusha may refer to:

- Jerusha, minor Old Testament figure
- Jerusha Bingham Kirkland (1743–1788), American missionary
- Jerusha Davidson Richardson (1864–1938), British philanthropist and author
- Jerusha Hess (born 1980), American filmmaker
- Jerusha Jhirad (1891–1984), Indian physician
