= Gottsche =

Gottsche (or Göttsche) is a German surname. It may refer to:

- Carl Christian Gottsche (1855–1909), German geologist
- Carl Moritz Gottsche (1808–1892), German physician and bryologist
- Lothar Göttsche (born 1961), Denmark-born German mathematician
- Mark Gottsche (born 1987), German Gaelic footballer
