= Gladstone Park, London =

Park in the Dollis Hill area of London

Coordinates: 51°33′28″N 0°14′10″W

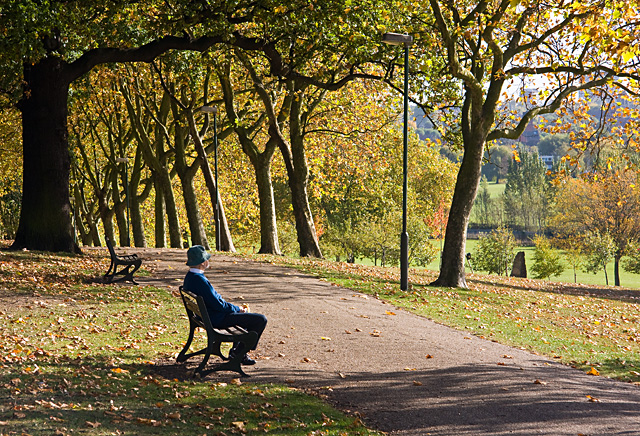
Gladstone Park

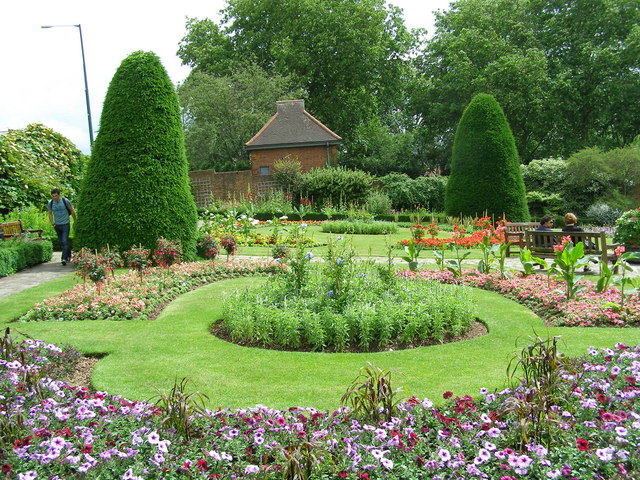
Walled garden, Gladstone Park

Gladstone Park is situated in the Dollis Hill area of north-west London. It is about 35 hectares (86 acres) in area.

Dollis Hill House was an early 19th-century farmhouse, located within the northern boundary of the park.

== Transport ==
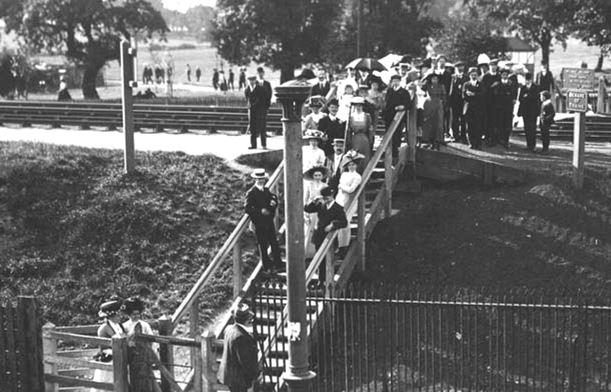
Crossing the Dudding Hill Line in late Victorian times, near the eastern end of the now-closed Dudding Hill railway station, and at the western end of Gladstone Park

Dollis Hill tube station on the London Underground Jubilee line is about a 10-minute walk away from the park, to the south-west. Cricklewood Thameslink station is to the east.

Bus services 226 and 232 also run through the area.

The park is situated on both sides of the Dudding Hill Line. This railway is currently only used by freight trains, but it has been subject to various railway schemes over the years, including a recent proposal for a radial North and West London Light railway (NWLLR), which might result in a light-rail stop being built at one or both ends of the park. There is a footbridge over the railway at the western end of the park, and a private road bridge (only used by Brent Parks Service) at the eastern end.

== History ==
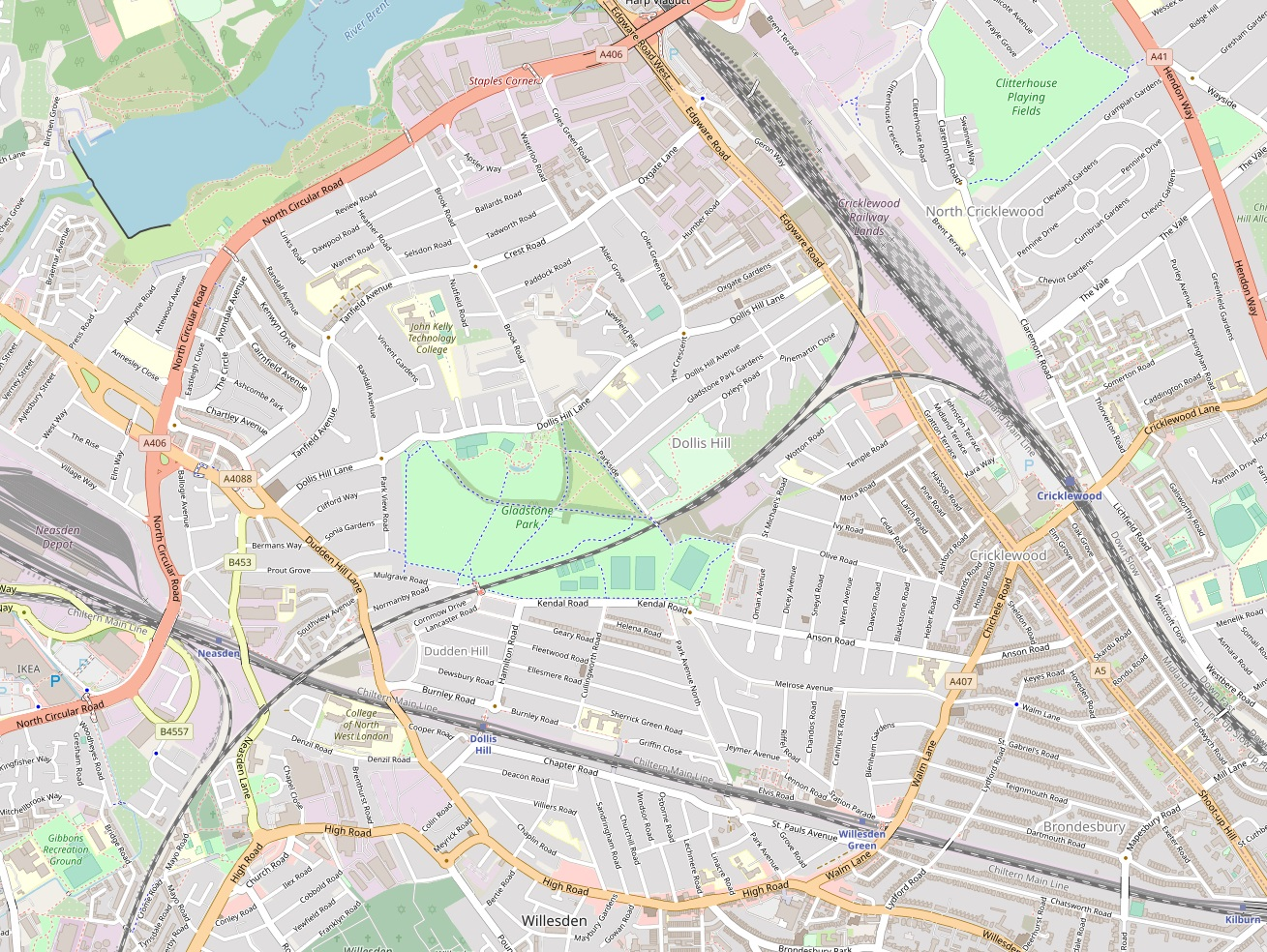
Map showing the park's location (OpenStreetMap)

It was chiefly the loss of sports grounds at Neasden by the arrival of the Great Central Railway towards the end of the 19th century that motivated local public backing for a new park at Dollis Hill. Hence, there was very strong support at Neasden for the idea that the district council should buy from the Finch family the part of their estate that lay south of Dollis Hill Lane, for £50,000. However, considerable opposition to the proposal, mainly on cost grounds, arose from other parts of Willesden, largely driven by the editor of the Willesden Chronicle from his office in South Kilburn.

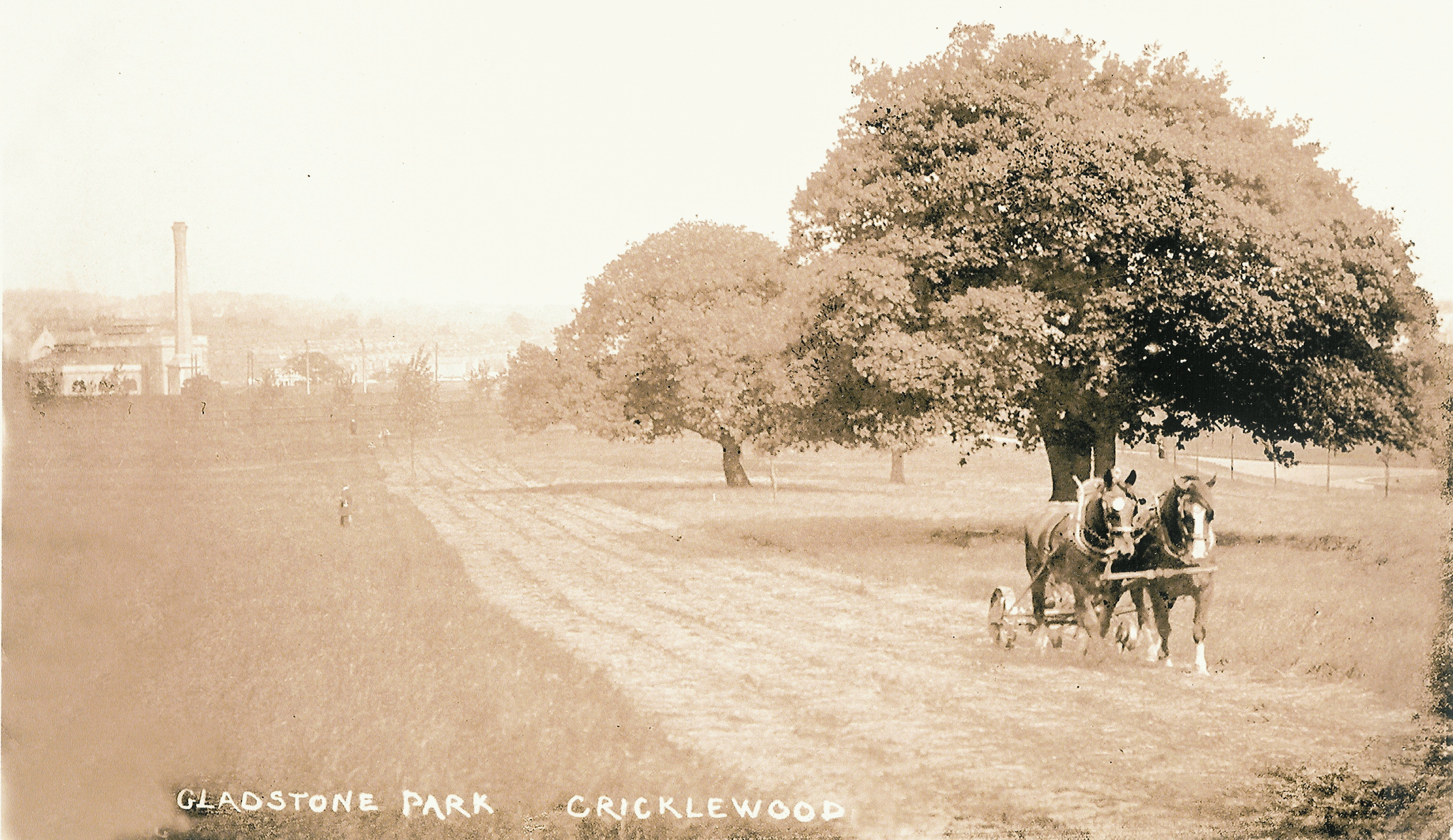
Gladstone Park c.1900

In the end the issue was resolved at an inquiry held by an inspector from the Local Government Board. He recommended acquisition of the land. Middlesex County Council agreed conditionally to put up £12,500 towards the cost; London County Council, £3,000; Hampstead £1,000; and Hendon £500, while the Ecclesiastical Commissioners made a £5,000 loan available on easy terms. The Municipal Borough of Willesden was left to find the rest of the money from their ratepayers and from donations. It would eventually cost nearly £52,000.

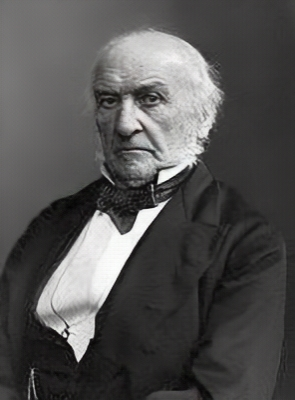
William Gladstone

The contract to purchase the house, garden, and estate from "Robert Augustus Finch and others" was signed by the council on 9 August 1899, and soon afterwards, notices to terminate existing tenancies (except that for the house and gardens) were sent out. Despite some reservations by local Conservatives, on 12 December 1899 it was formally agreed to name the park after William Ewart Gladstone, the old Prime Minister who had died the previous year, and who had spent many happy hours there. Purchase was completed early in 1900.

The Earl of Rosebery, recently twice Prime Minister, had promised to perform the opening ceremony on Saturday 25 May 1901, but was prevented from attending by the death of his mother. In his absence, the park was declared open by the Earl of Aberdeen.

== Design ==
Copy of map of park taken from the land purchase document. The route of the Dudding Hill Line railway is obvious, and widens at the western end, at Dudding Hill station

Once it had been agreed that Gladstone Park should become a reality, the main planning was handed over to Oliver Claude Robson, the District Council Surveyor who was to serve for 43 years, from 1875 to 1918. Robson's first major pleasure ground project had been the nearby Roundwood Park which had opened in 1895, and where he had to convert poorly drained farmland. The much larger Gladstone Park was to prove a rather less challenging undertaking. It was decided to leave the northern part of new park in its "original and natural beauty", and devote the section south of the railway to sports. The latter was to prove useful to Robson since it was levelled with slop (road refuse), for which he was always short of landfill sites. Hedges and ditches dividing these southern fields were obliterated, but some trees were left standing.

Robson had little laying out work to do but provided boundary fencing, a children's playground (gymnasium), 103 seats, conveniences, stabling, pavilions for football and cricket clubs, water supply, and 2900 feet of roadways. All the old farm ponds on the estate were filled in to depth not exceeding 2 feet for safety reasons, and some later converted to children's paddling pools. (These subsequently became a problem to the Council, perhaps for health reasons, and were dispensed with in 1920).

Cleverly, Robson waited for the public to mark out what he called "dump" across the park before converting them to metalled pathways. Some plantations in Roundwood Park were thinned and the surplus trees transplanted at Gladstone Park. Hundreds of plane trees were set along the pathways.

A major event for Willesden was the provision of its first public swimming bath (now closed), which Robson designed in 1902. According to the Willesden Guide 1905/6, the cost was £2569 6s 5d. It was based on Harrow School swimming bath, which representatives of the Council had visited and approved. All the construction work, which commenced on 2 March 1903, was carried out by the Engineer's Department without the intervention of a contractor, thus providing work for the local unemployed.

By 1908/9, Robson had added a bowling green and four tennis courts. Dollis Hill House was renovated at an estimated cost of £616 11s 6d, and the ground floor was let to a contractor for the sale of refreshments. The park constable occupied the rear portion of the house.

The following year the Surveyor converted the former fruit and vegetable garden attached to the house into an Old English garden, which was to become one of the park's star attractions. Robson probably erected a sundial, provided by Cricklewood & District Improvements Association in 1907, at the centre of the garden.

For many years there had been worries about the level crossing over the Dudding Hill Line where the public were exposed to danger from the trains. There was an intention to provide two subways under the railway to improve communications between southern and northern sections of the park but, although the Midland Railway Company raised no objection to the work, it never materialised. However, in October 1912 the Council entered into an agreement with the Midland for the erection of a footbridge to replace the old crossing.

Many other works by Robson were completed before he took retirement in 1918.

== The park today ==
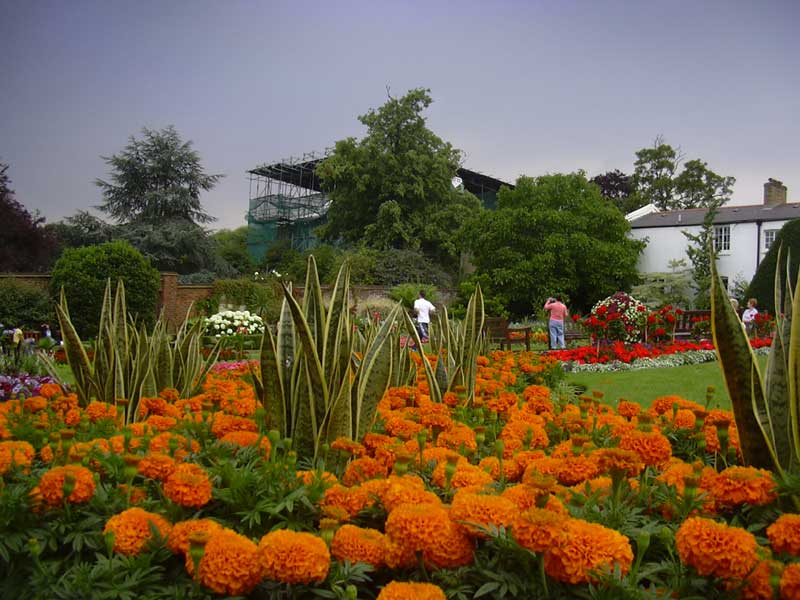
Dollis House as seen from the gardens

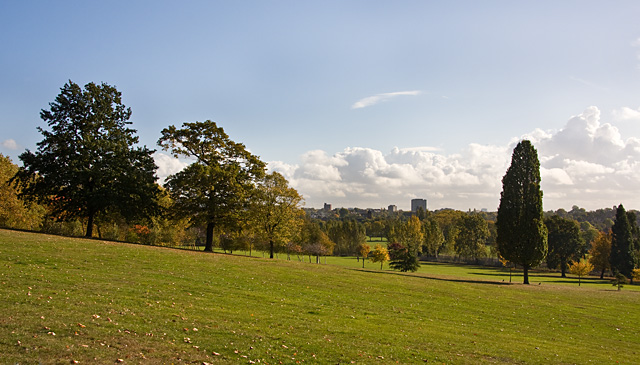
Gladstone Park

Gladstone Park is administered by the London Borough of Brent. It has ninety-seven acres of parkland as well as the twenty-seven acres of the William Gladstone open space on its eastern perimeter. Maintained by Brent Parks Service, it is the most heavily used park in Brent and is a current holder of the Green Flag Award, the national standard for parks and green spaces in England and Wales. The award is based on high environmental standards, quality of green space, amenity values and community involvement.

Gladstone Park has a formal garden, duck pond, varied terrain, woodland, hedgerows and open ground, all of which change with the seasons. On clear days it offers views from the top of the hill (65 metres above sea level) of London and the surrounding area, including Wembley Stadium, Parliament, the City, the London Eye and the Shard.

In 2016 the Council, police and local charities carried out several initiatives to deal with large numbers of people sleeping rough in the park. Most of them were Romanians seeking to work in the UK, some obtaining employment informally in nearby Cricklewood.

The park is used by Brent Council as a venue for free sports and health and fitness programs. On the night of 23 August 2014 the park was used for a marriage proposal with hundreds of candles spelling out, "Will you marry me?" A Metropolitan Police helicopter picked up the message with its thermal imaging camera and shared the image on Twitter as "the most romantic guy in North London".

Following the 2020 Black Lives Matter protests Brent Council considered renaming the park due to William Gladstone's push for compensation for slave owners at abolition, including his father. However in September 2022 the council confirmed that there were no plans to change the park's name. Instead a public artwork titled The Anchor, The Drum, The Ship by Black artist Harun Morrison was created in the park to acknowledge the legacies of the slave trade. A history trail "Untold Stories" exploring the history of the park, Gladstone's links with slavery, and Black people with a connection to the area was also installed in the park.
