= The Asclepiad =

19th-century medical journal

The Asclepiad was a quarterly medical journal published and edited by the British physician and medical historian Benjamin Ward Richardson in 1861 and from 1884 to 1895.

== Early publication (First series, 1861) ==
The Asclepiad was originally published by Richardson in 1861 with the subtitle of Clinical Essays. This was originally intended as a periodical. However, Richardson's other activities led to his requiring to stop the project.

== Later publication (Second series, 1884-1895) ==
Richardson re-founded The Asclepiad with the new subtitle of A Book of Original Research and Observation in the Science, Art, and Literature of Medicine, Preventive and Curative. This run continued for 11 volumes from 1884 to 1895. The eleventh volume was delayed in publication which Richardson explained was due to "unusual labour in hospital practice, together with original researches on nervous matter, which would not admit of hasty observation". Richardson remained the editor of The Asclepiad until his death when the journal ceased publication.

| Volume | Year | Source |
|---|---|---|
| 1 | 1884 | Archive.org |
| 2 | 1885 | Archive.org |
| 3 | 1886 | Archive.org |
| 4 | 1887 | Archive.org |
| 5 | 1888 | Archive.org |
| 6 | 1889 | Archive.org |
| 7 | 1890 | Archive.org |
| 8 | 1891 | Archive.org |
| 9 | 1892 | Archive.org |
| 10 | 1893 | Archive.org |
| 11 | 1895 | Archive.org |
