= Benjamin Ward Richardson =

British physician and medical historian (1828–1896)

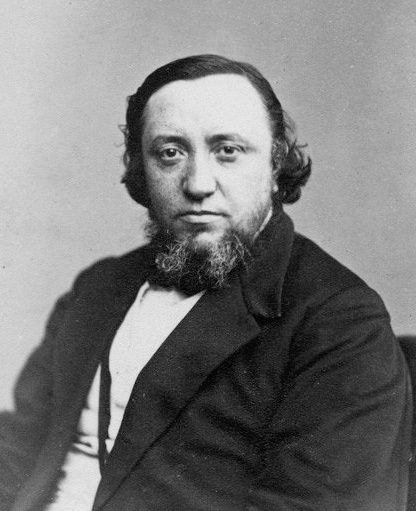
- Portrait of Benjamin Ward Richardson, by Henry Joseph Whitlock, late 1860s–1870s
- Born: 28 October 1828; Somerby, Leicestershire
- Died: 21 November 1896 (aged 68); London
- Occupations: Physician; medical historian
- Known for: Public hygiene

Sir Benjamin Ward Richardson FRS FRCP (31 October 1828 – 21 November 1896) was a British physician, anaesthetist, physiologist, sanitarian, and a prolific writer on medical history. He was the recipient of the Fothergill gold medal, awarded by the Medical Society of London in 1854 and of the Astley Cooper triennial prize for an essay in physiology.

He was a close personal friend, and professional colleague, of John Snow. On Snow's sudden death he took over the final editing of Snow's draft On Chloroform and Other Anaesthetics and supervised its publication in 1858. Ward Richardson remained a committed exponent of Snow's radical views on the microbial cause of infectious disease for the rest of his life. He continued, and extended, Snow's work on inhalation anaesthesia and brought into clinical use, no less than fourteen anaesthetics, of which methylene bichloride is the best known, and he invented the first double-valved mouthpiece for use in the administration of chloroform. He also made known the peculiar properties of amyl nitrite, a drug which was largely used in the treatment of angina pectoris, and he introduced the bromides of quinine, iron and strychnia, ozonized ether, styptic and iodized colloid, hydrogen peroxide, and sodium ethoxide, substances which were soon largely used by the medical profession. In 1893, he was knighted in recognition of his eminent services to humanitarian causes.

== Education ==
Richardson was born at Somerby in Leicestershire, the only son of Benjamin Richardson and Mary Ward. He was educated by the Rev. W. Young Nutt at the Burrough Hill school in the same county. Being destined by the deathbed wish of his mother for the medical profession, his studies were always directed to that end, and he was apprenticed early to Henry Hudson, the surgeon at Somerby.

He entered Anderson's University (now [University of Strathclyde]), in 1847, but a severe attack of famine fever (either typhus or relapsing fever) that he caught while he was a pupil at St Andrews Lying-in Hospital (now Princess Royal Maternity Hospital), interrupted his studies, and led him to become an assistant, first to Thomas Browne of Saffron Walden in Essex, and afterwards to Edward Dudley Hudson at Littlethorpe, Cosby, near Leicester. Hudson was the elder brother of his former master.

In 1854, he was admitted M.A. and M.D. of St Andrews, where he afterwards became a member of the university court, an assessor of the general council, and in 1877, an honorary LL.D.

== Career ==
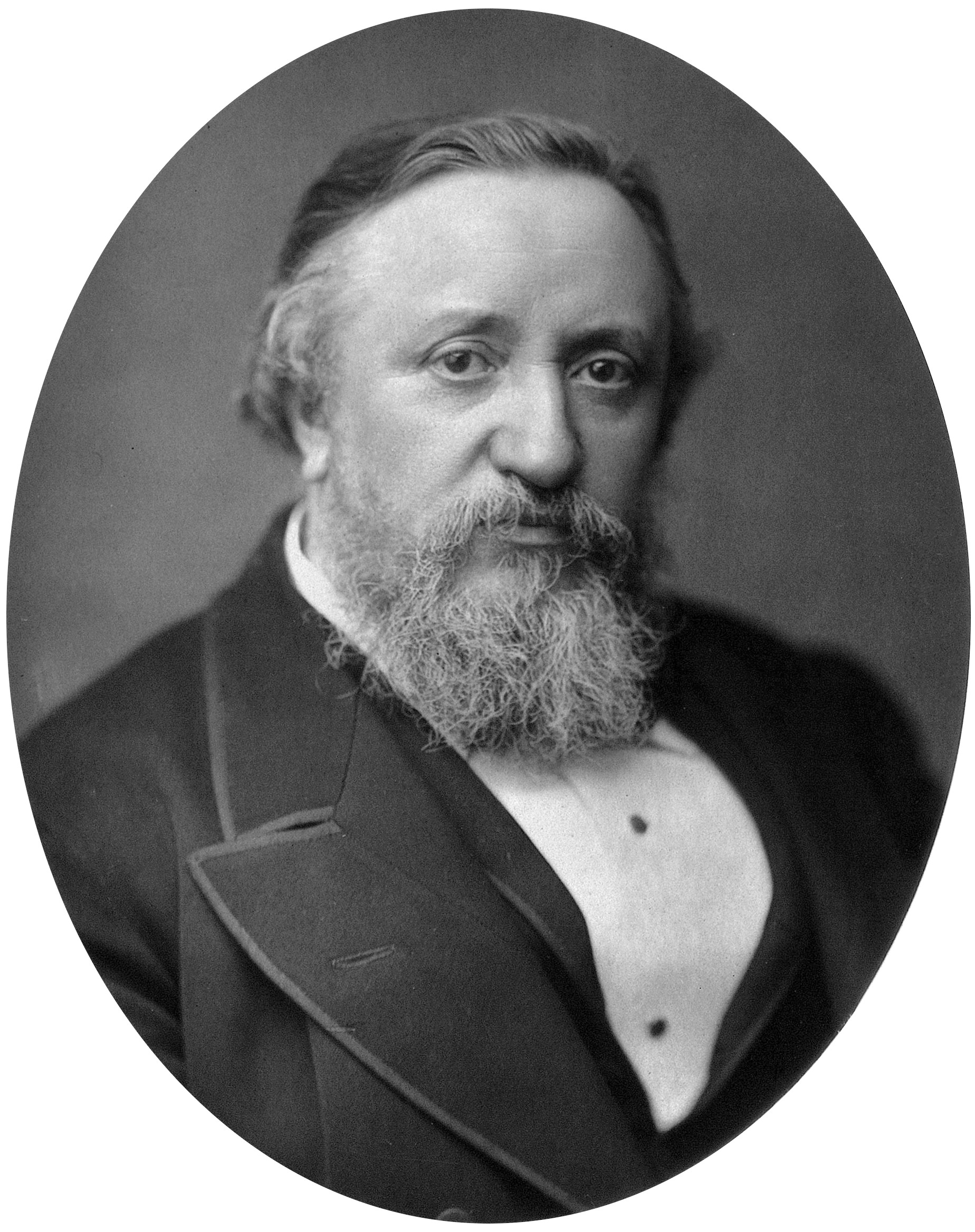
Benjamin Ward Richardson

In 1849, Richardson left Hudson and joined Dr Robert Willis of Barnes, well known as the editor of the works of William Harvey, and librarian of the Royal College of Surgeons of England (1828–1845). Richardson lived at Mortlake, and at about this time, became a member of "Our Club", where he met Douglas Jerrold, William Makepeace Thackeray, William Hepworth Dixon, Mark Lemon, John Doran and George Cruikshank, of whose will he became an executor.

In 1850, Richardson was admitted as a licentiate to the Faculty of Physicians and Surgeons of Glasgow. He became a faculty lecturer in 1877, and was elected a Fellow on 3 June 1878.

Richardson was a founder, and for thirty-five times in succession the President of the St Andrews Medical Graduates' Association. He was admitted as a member of the Royal College of Physicians of London in 1856, and was elected a Fellow in 1865, serving the office of materia medica lecturer in 1866. In 1867, he was elected a fellow of the Royal Society, and delivered the Croonian lecture in 1873 on "The Muscular Irritability after Systemic Death."

Richardson moved to London in 1853–1854, and took a house at 12 Hinde Street, whence he moved to 25 Manchester Square. In 1854, he was appointed physician to the Blenheim Street Dispensary, and in 1856 to the Royal Infirmary for Diseases of the Chest in the City Road. He was also physician to the Metropolitan Dispensary (1856), to the Marylebone, and to the Margaret Street Dispensaries (1856), and in 1892, he became physician to the London Temperance Hospital. For many years he was physician to the "Newspaper Press Fund" and to the "Royal Literary Fund", the committee of which, he was long an active member.

In 1854, Richardson became a lecturer on forensic medicine at the Grosvenor Place School of Medicine, where he was afterwards appointed the first lecturer on public hygiene, posts which he resigned in 1857 for the lectureship on physiology. He remained dean of the school until 1865, when it was sold and, with all the other buildings in the old Tattersall's yard, demolished. Richardson was also a lecturer about this time at the College of Dentists, then occupying a part of the Polytechnic Institution in Regent Street.president of the health section of the Social Science Association, notably in 1875, when he delivered a celebrated address at Brighton on "Hygeia", in which he told of what a city should be if sanitary science were advanced in a proper manner. In the same year he gave the Cantor lectures at the Society of Arts, taking "alcohol" as the subject.

In 1854, Richardson was awarded the Fothergillian prize of the Medical Society of London for his essay on the Diseases of the Unborn Child and elected the society's president in 1868.

Richardson was elected an international member of the American Philosophical Society in 1863, and of the Imperial Leopold Carolina Academy of Sciences in 1867. He became a fellow of the Society of Antiquaries in 1877. In 1880 he was co-opted on to the London School Board. In June 1893, he was knighted in recognition of his eminent services to humanitarian causes.

He was elected President of the Association of Public Sanitary Inspectors of Great Britain (later renamed the Sanitary Inspectors Association (SIA)) from 1890 to 1896. Like his predecessor, Sir Edwin Chadwick, he took a close interest in the Association, on many occasions leading deputations to the President of the Local Government Board to argue the case for security of tenure for inspectors against arbitrary dismissal. The local authority employers often consisted of local slum property owners and small businessmen, such as butchers, slaughterhouse owners, mill and factory owners, whose financial interests were affected by the inspectors' efforts. He also argued strongly on behalf of the sanitary inspectors who were for decades excluded from their own Examination and Registration Boards by medical interests who were concerned to keep the inspectors 'in their proper place' and preserve public health administration as a medical domain. His lawyer son Aubrey was also active on behalf of the SIA.

In 1862, he published Asclepiad: clinical essays volume 1, intended as a periodical; however, it was not widely received. It was not until 1884 when he published a new series The Asclepiad volume 1, second series, that it received adequate distribution and became a regular quarterly periodical, going under the full-blown title of The Asclepiad: A Book of Original Research and Observation in the Science, Art, and Literature of Medicine, Preventive and Curative. It continued to be published, through eleven volumes, until 1895.

== Awards ==
In 1854, Richardson was awarded the Fothergillian gold medal by the Medical Society of London for an essay on the "Diseases of the Foetus in Utero". In 1856, he gained the Astley Cooper triennial prize of 300 guineas for his essay on "The Coagulation of the Blood."

== Epilogue ==
Richardson died at 25 Manchester Square on 21 November 1896, and his body was cremated at Brookwood, Surrey.

Richardson was a sanitary reformer, who busied himself with many of the smaller details of domestic sanitation which tend, in the aggregate, to prolong the average life in each generation. He spent many years in attempts to relieve pain among men by discovering and adapting substances capable of producing general or local anaesthesia, and among animals by more humane methods of slaughter. He brought into use, no less than fourteen anaesthetics, of which methylene bichloride is the best known, and he invented the first double-valved mouthpiece for use in the administration of chloroform. He also produced local insensibility by freezing the part with an ether spray, and he gave animals euthanasia by means of a lethal chamber.

Richardson was an ardent and determined champion of total abstinence, for he held that alcohol was so powerful a drug that it should only be used by skilled hands in the greatest emergencies. He was also one of the earliest advocates of bicycling; he wrote 'Cycling as an Intellectual Pursuit' for Longman's Magazine in 1883. In 1863, he made known the peculiar properties of amyl nitrite, a drug which was largely used in the treatment of breast-pang (angina pectoris), and he introduced the bromides of quinine, iron and strychnia, ozonized ether, styptic and iodized colloid, peroxide of hydrogen, and ethylate of soda, substances which were soon largely used by the medical profession.

Richardson was a vice-president of the Bread Reform League. The League formed in 1880 to spread "knowledge of the dietetic advantage of Wheat-Meal Bread." Richardson opposed the slaughter of animals but was not a vegetarian. He wrote that "It is quite true that I lean strongly towards the vegetarian movement. I have not, however, become a strict vegetarian, but have rather busied myself in showing how animals can be painlessly killed and carefully cleansed for the meat-market."

Richardson was one of the most prolific writers of his generation. He wrote biographies, plays, poems, and songs, in addition to his more strictly scientific work. He wrote the Asclepiad, a series of original researches in the science, art, and literature of medicine. A single volume was issued in 1861, after which it appeared quarterly from 1884 to 1895. He was the originator and the editor of the Journal of Public Health and Sanitary Review (1855). He contributed many articles, signed and unsigned, to The Lancet, The Medical Times and The Gazette.

== Family ==
He married, on 21 February 1857, Mary J. Smith of Mortlake, by whom he left two surviving sons and one daughter. His son Aubrey married the writer and philanthropist Jerusha Davidson Richardson.

== Works ==
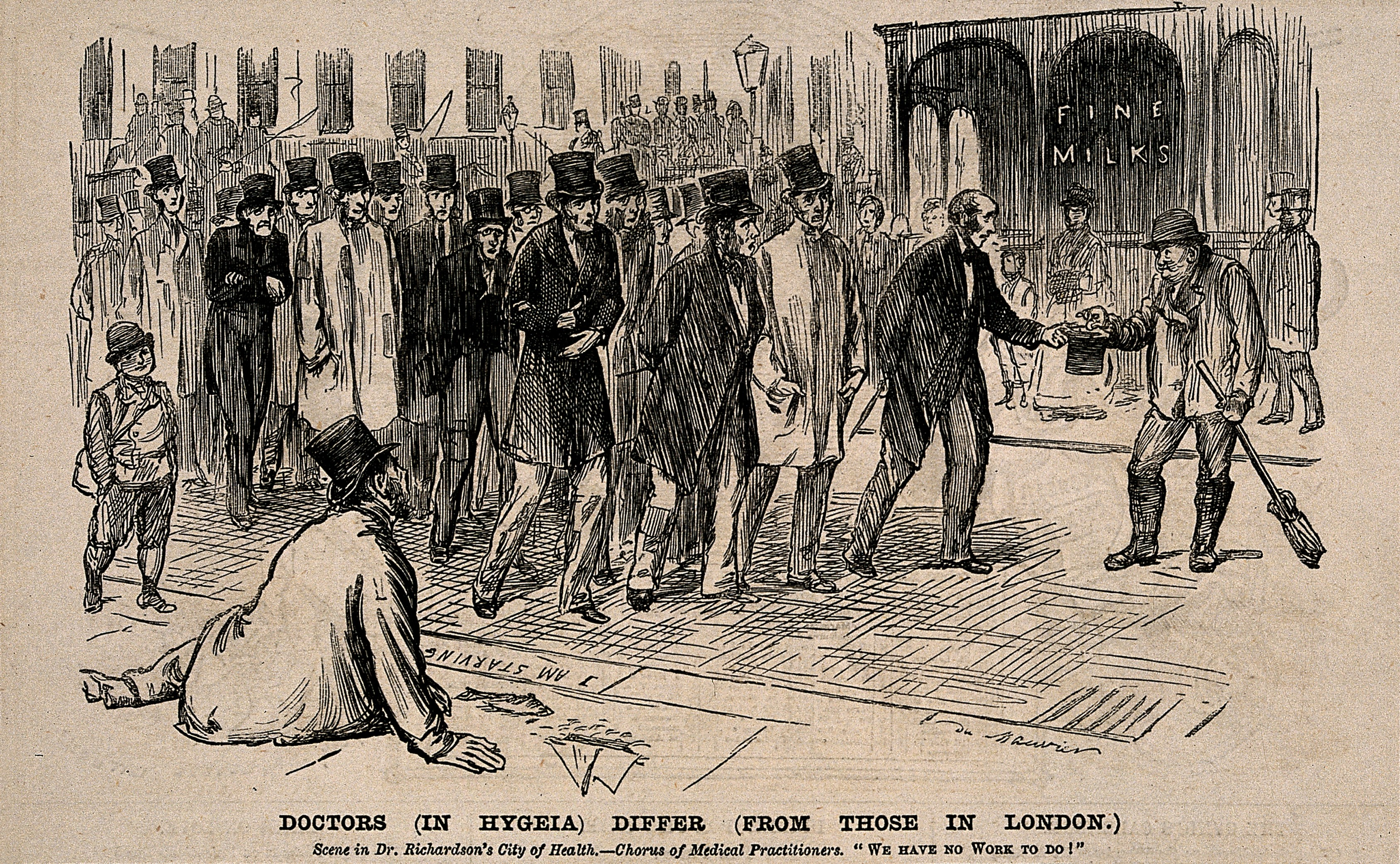
Scene in Hygeia, a City of Health

Non-fiction

- (1858). The Cause of the Coagulation of the Blood.
- (1876). On Alcohol.
- (1876). Diseases of Modern Life.
- (1876). Hygeia, a City of Health.
- (1877). The Future of Sanitary Science.
- (1878). Health and Life.
- (1878). Total Abstinence.
- (1882). Dialogues on Drink.
- (1882). Diseases of Modern Life.
- (1884). On the Healthy Manufacture of Bread.
- (1884). Brief Notes for Temperance Teachers.
- (1884). The Field of Disease.
- (1887). The Commonhealth.
- (1887). Public School Temperance.
- (1891). Foods for Man: Animal and Vegetable: A Comparison.
- (1891). The Diary and Life of Thomas Sopwith.
- (1896). Biological Experimentation: Its Function and Limits.
- (1897). Vita Medica: Chapters of a Medical Life and Work.
- (1900). Disciples of Aesculapius.

Fiction

- (1888). The Son of a Star: A Romance of the Second Century.

=== Selected articles ===
- (1880). "Health Through Education," The Gentleman's Magazine, Vol. CCXLVI, pp. 288–303.
- (1880). "Dress in Relation to Health," The Gentleman's Magazine, Vol. CCXLVI, pp. 469–488.
- (1881). "A First Electrician," The Gentleman's Magazine, Vol. CCLI, pp. 460–480.
- (1882). "Race and Life on English Soil," The Eclectic Magazine 36, pp. 606–621.
- (1886). "Woman's Work in Creation," Longman's Magazine 8, pp. 604–619.

=== Miscellany ===
- (1888). "Preface," to The Autobiography of George Harris. London: Hazell, Watson & Viney, Ltd.
- (1889). "The Art of Embalming," in Wood's Medical and Surgical Monographs. New York: William Wood & Company.
- (1895). "Introduction," to A Wheel Within a Wheel: How I Learned to Ride the Bicycle, by Frances Elizabeth Willard. London: Hutchinson & Co.
