= Dollis Hill House =

19th-century house in London, England

Coordinates: 51.559641°N 0.237078°W

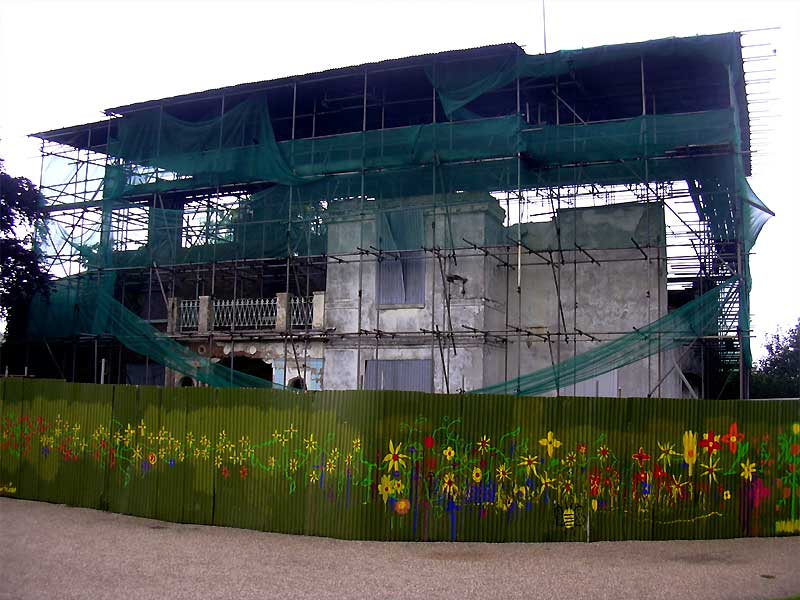
- The facade of Dollis Hill House surrounded by scaffolding, July 2007
- Interactive map of the Dollis Hill House area

General information
- Location: Dollis Hill, London, England
- Completed: 1825
- Demolished: January 2012
- Client: Finch family

Technical details
- Structural system: Brick

Dollis Hill House was an early 19th-century house also known as Dollis Hill Villa in today's north London suburb of Dollis Hill. Most of its gardens, south, form Gladstone Park and its owners were the freeholders of the farm estate, north, Dollis Hill Farm which together occupied the eminence, known as Dollis Hill, along with part of Willesden Paddocks in the parish of that name. Guests such as William Ewart Gladstone and Mark Twain were entertained there. The house became derelict after successive fire damage in 1995, 1996 and 2011, the last of which being the basement. As such the building was demolished in 2012 but a performance centre sits on its footprint. Dollis Hill House was an initial-class (Grade II) listed building and reached grade A on the English Heritage Buildings at Risk Register.

== History ==
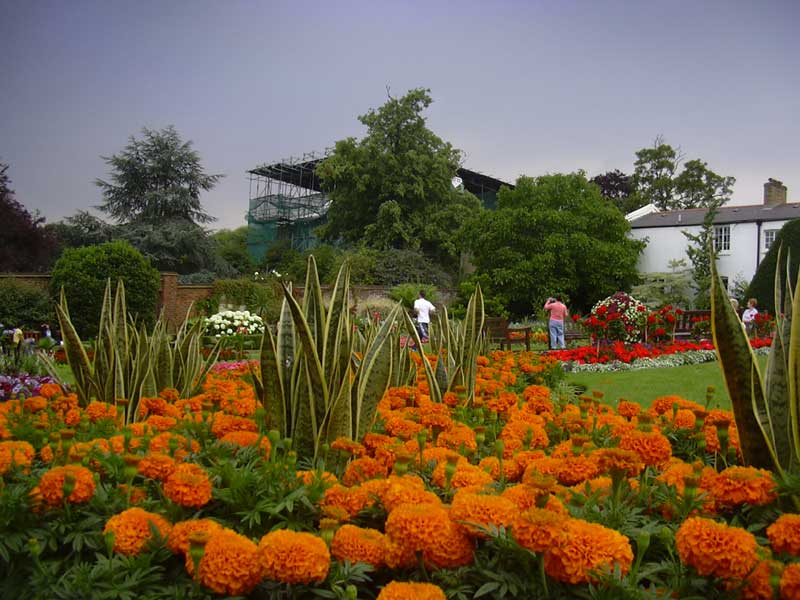
The house as seen from the gardens

Dollis Hill House was built as a farmhouse in 1825 by the Finch family when the Dollis Hill area was still rural. It was later occupied by Sir Dudley Coutts Marjoribanks, who subsequently became Lord Tweedmouth. In 1881 Lord Tweedmouth's daughter and her husband, Lord Aberdeen, took up residence. They often had Prime Minister William Ewart Gladstone to stay as a guest. Other guests at the house included Joseph Chamberlain, Lord Rosebery, and Lord Randolph Churchill, father of Winston Churchill.

The estate in the "ancient" Willesden parish, today in the daughter (ecclesiastical-only) parish of Neasden, was on maps recorded as Dollis Hill Villa, not to be confused with its tenant farm opposite. In 1897 Lord Aberdeen was appointed Governor General of Canada and the family moved out. Newspaper proprietor Hugh Gilzean-Reid occupied the house after the Aberdeens moved out, and his guests included the American author Mark Twain, who stayed at Dollis Hill house in the summer of 1900. Twain wrote that he had "never seen any place that was so satisfactorily situated, with its noble trees and stretch of country, and everything that went to make life delightful, and all within a biscuit's throw of the metropolis of the world." "There is no suggestion of city here; it is country, pure and simple, and as still and reposeful as is the bottom of the sea." He later wrote "Dollis Hill comes nearer to being a paradise than any other home I ever occupied".

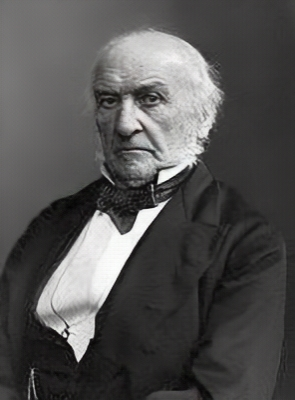
William Ewart Gladstone

Willesden Urban District Council acquired the house and land in 1899, converting the extensive gardens into a public park with bowling green, naming it Gladstone Park, after the former Prime Minister, who had died the year before. The house was opened to the public in 1909, but it was used as a hospital during the First World War. The commandant of Voluntary Aid Detachment number 58, Jerusha Davidson Richardson opened Dollis Hill House in February 1916 as a new auxiliary military hospital. It was one of several auxiliary hospitals for the suffragette run Endell Street Military Hospital. The new Dollis Hill hospital had 27 beds but it was soon expanded to 70 beds using huts. The hospital continued until 1923.

In the Second World War, Winston Churchill's War Cabinet met there during 1941. The original Red Cross Flag, that flew over the House, when it was being used as a hospital was laid up in the nearby St. Catherine's Church, where it still hangs, together with a memorial plaque.

From 1974 the house was used for training courses for catering students, until it was closed in 1989. Two major fires in 1995 and 1996 damaged the house badly, and from then onward it remained derelict. On February 20, 2011, a third fire broke out in the basement of Dollis Hill house; the gate had been forced open, and the fire is believed to have been caused by intruders. Various proposals were made for redeveloping the house as a pub, but were rejected by local residents.

In 2006, Ken Livingstone (then Mayor of London) offered funding to support the renovation costs, but the funding was withdrawn by his successor, Boris Johnson. Dollis Hill House Trust worked to find a solution in accordance with Brent Council's stipulations, teaming up briefly with social enterprise, [Training for Life]. When funding failed, the Council declared its intention to initiate an application for demolition.

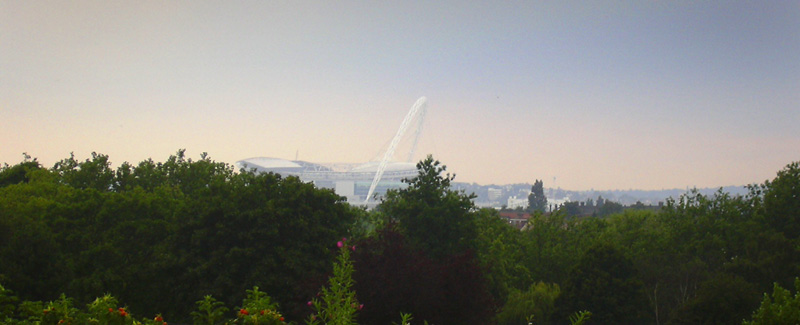
The view looking west from the house over Brent to Wembley Stadium

== Preservation campaign ==
The Dollis Hill House Trust is a charity which campaigned for the restoration of Dollis Hill House to create a community, arts and heritage centre in Gladstone Park.

In June 2008 the Heritage Lottery Fund awarded match funding of £1.2 million to enable restoration of the house. All plans for the House were to include community use with a restaurant and tearoom. The project was dependent on additional funding promised by London Mayor Ken Livingstone, but subject to negotiations with his successor, Boris Johnson.

In April 2011 Brent Council announced that all attempts to save Dollis Hill House had failed, and that they had been given permission by the Secretary of State for Communities and Local Government to demolish the building. In January 2012, Dollis Hill House was entirely demolished, leaving the historic site barren.

In mid-2012 Brent council built an indoor performance space matching (only) the old floor plan of the house.
