= Acton Central railway station =

London Overground station

Acton Central
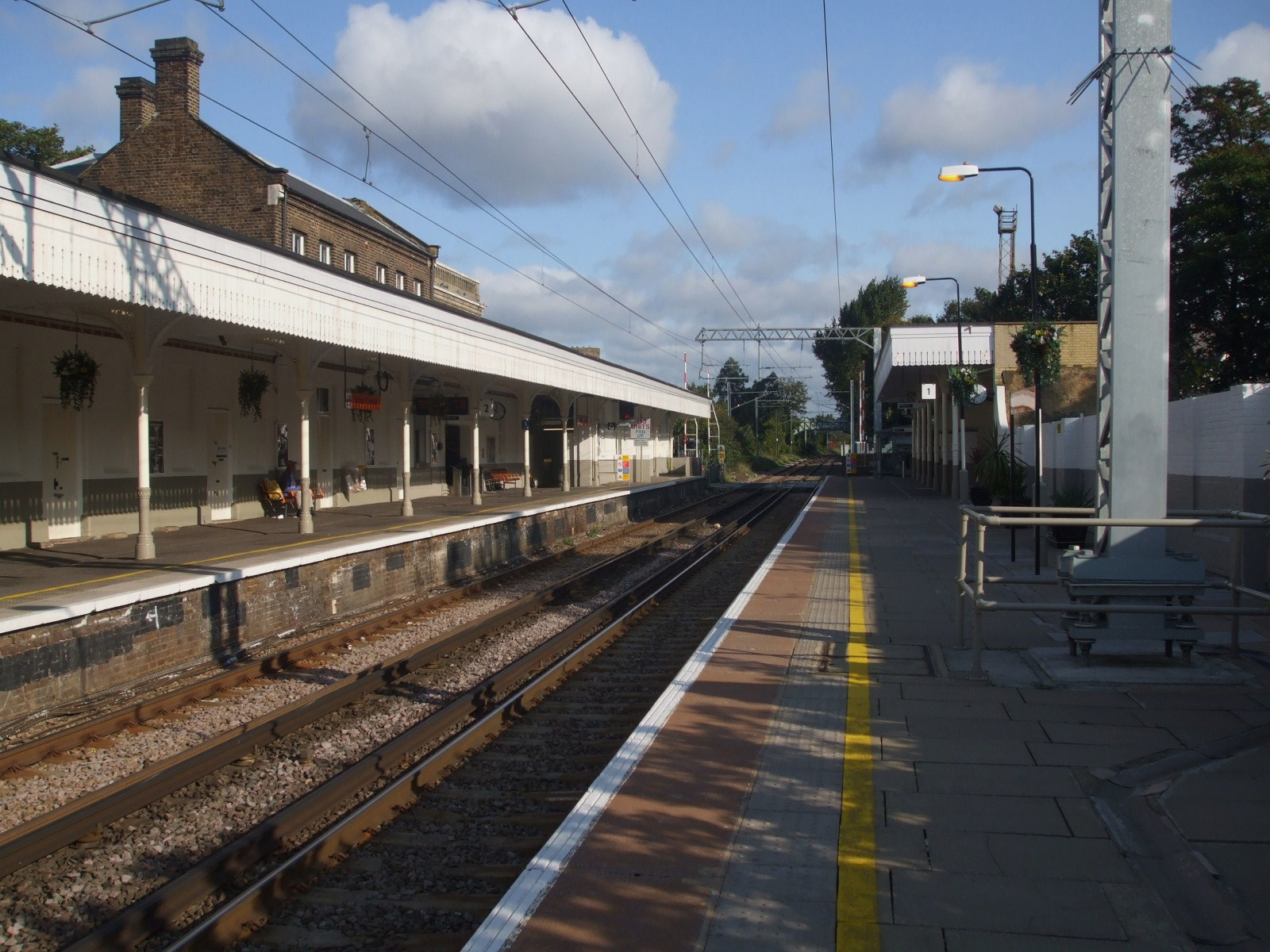
- Interactive map of Acton Central

General information
- Location: Acton
- Local authority: London Borough of Ealing
- Managed by: London Overground
- Owner: Network Rail
- Station code: ACC
- DfT category: D
- Number of platforms: 2
- Accessible: Yes
- Fare zone: 3

National Rail annual entry and exit
- 2020–21: ▼0.727 million
- 2021–22: ▲1.333 million
- 2022–23: ▲1.499 million
- 2023–24: ▲1.558 million
- 2024–25: ▲1.574 million

Key dates
- 1 August 1853: Station opens as Acton
- 1 November 1925: Station renamed Acton Central

Other information
- External links: Departures; Facilities
- Coordinates: 51.5087°N 0.2630°W

Acton Central is a station on the Mildmay line of the London Overground, situated between South Acton and Willesden Junction stations in London fare zone 3.

The station is located at the point where Mildmay line trains switch their power supply from overhead line equipment (25 kV AC) to third rail shoes (750 V DC), or vice versa, depending on direction of travel (overhead line is used to Stratford, while third rail is used to Richmond).

== History ==
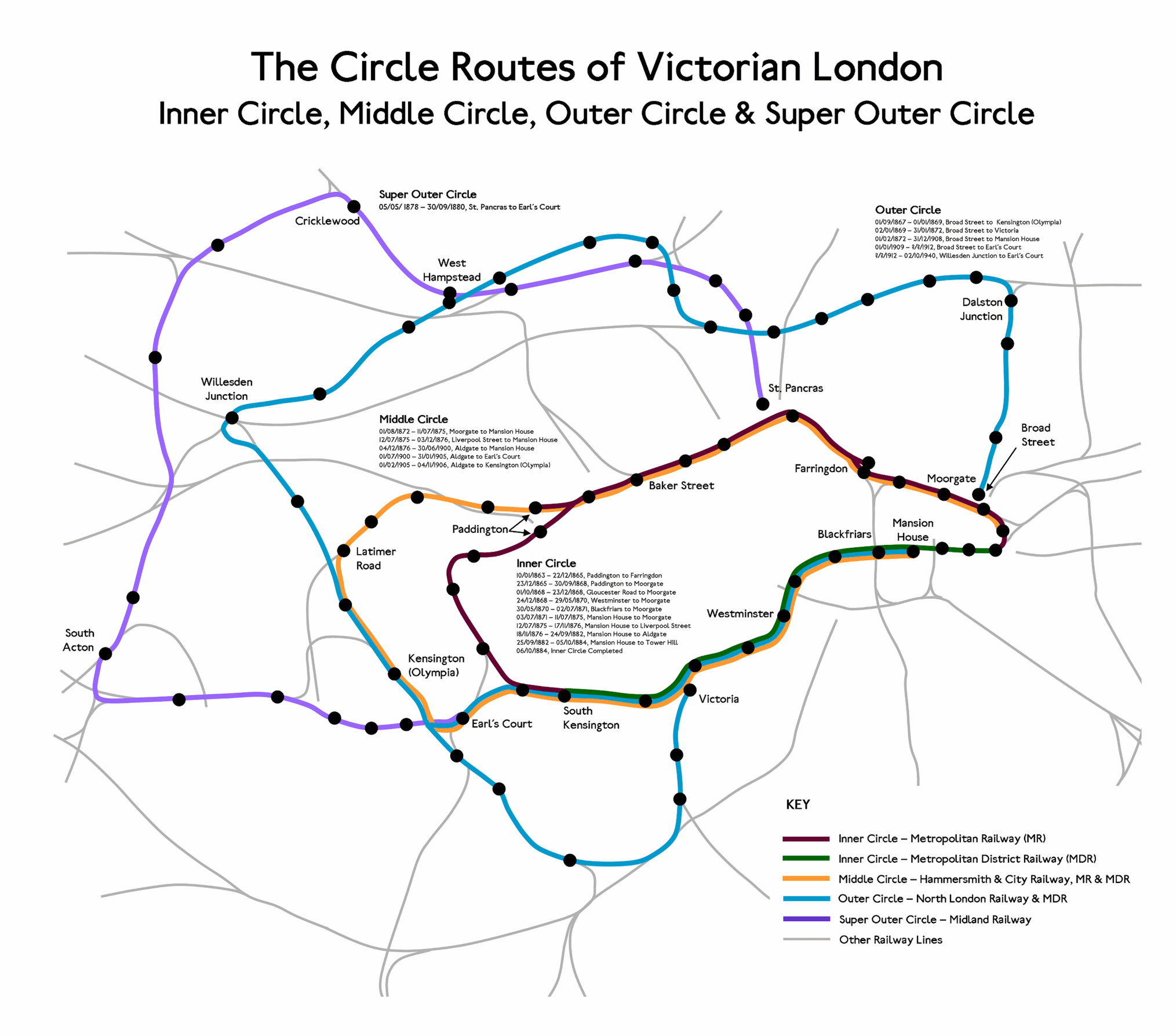
The Victorian Super Outer Circle route. Acton Central station is on the lower left, to the north of South Acton station

The station was opened as Acton on 1 August 1853 by the North and South Western Junction Railway (N&SWJR), but was renamed Acton Central on 1 November 1925. The N&SWJR was leased jointly to the London and North Western Railway (LNWR), the Midland Railway (MR) and the North London Railway (NLR) from 1871, but only the NLR operated passenger trains on the N&SWJR until operation of the NLR (and thus of the N&SWJR also) was taken over by the LNWR in 1909. Under the terms of the Railways Act 1921, the LNWR and MR amalgamated (together with some others) at the start of 1923 to form the London, Midland and Scottish Railway, which then absorbed both the NLR and the N&SWJR. The line then passed on to the London Midland Region of British Railways on nationalisation in 1948.

When sectorisation was introduced, the station was served by Network SouthEast until the privatisation of British Rail.

Between 1875 and 1902 it was connected with St Pancras via the Dudding Hill line, which branches off the North London line between Acton Central and Willesden Junction. Harlesden (Midland) railway station was the next stop on the line north. The Dudding Hill line is still open today, but only carries freight.

Acton Central station was named for closure by the 1963 Beeching Report, also known as the Beeching Axe.

Acton Central was in Zone 2 until 2 January 2008.

In 2011, the platforms were lengthened to allow longer trains.

== Passenger volume ==
Passenger volume at Acton Central
	2019-20	2020-21	2021-22	2022-23
Entries and exits	1,753,806	727,052	1,332,790	1,499,036

== Services ==
All services at Acton Central are operated as the Mildmay line of the London Overground using Class 378 EMUs.

The typical off-peak service in trains per hour is:

- Four trains per hour to Stratford via Willesden Junction
- Four trains per hour to Richmond

During the peak hours, the service is increased up to 5 tph in each direction.

Preceding station	London Overground	Following station
South Acton towards Richmond	Mildmay line North London line	Willesden Junction towards Stratford
Disused railways
South Acton	Midland Railway Dudding Hill Line	Harlesden (Midland)

== Connections ==
London Buses routes 70, 207 and 218 and SL8, and night routes N7, N207 and N266 serve the station.

== Future ==
Transport for London has proposed opening a new West London Orbital line across West London, which would allow London Overground services to run from Brent Cross West, via Old Oak Common and Acton Central, to Hounslow.
