= Harlesden railway station (Midland Railway) =

Former railway station in England

Harlesden
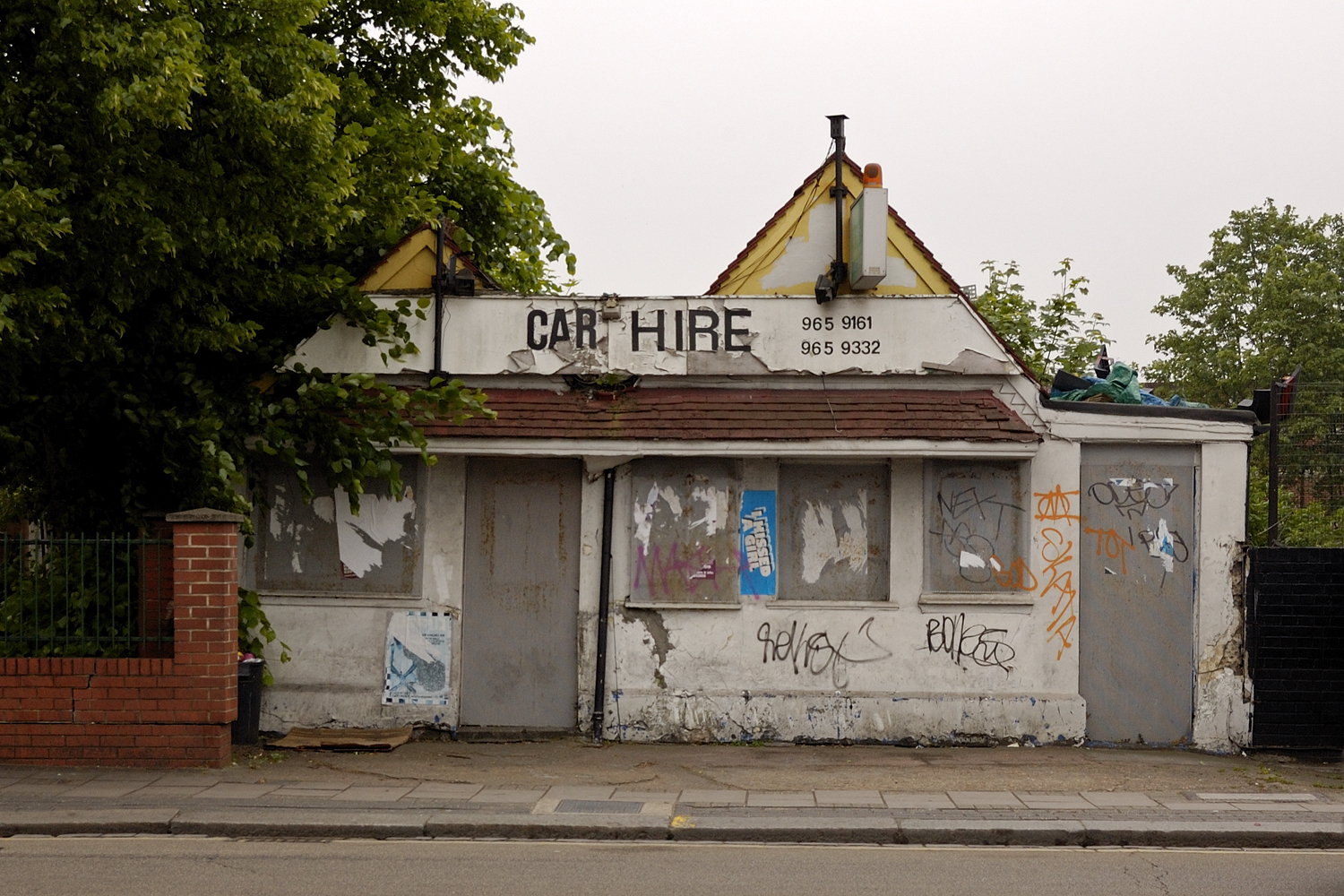
- The former Harlesden Station goods office, demolished in 2011. The ticket office was off to the right, above the railway lines.
- Interactive map of Harlesden

General information
- Location: Harlesden
- Local authority: London Borough of Brent
- Number of platforms: 2

Railway companies
- Original company: Midland Railway
- Pre-grouping: Midland Railway

Key dates
- 3 August 1875: Opened as Harrow Road for Stonebridge Park and West Willesden
- 1 February 1876: Renamed Harrow Road for Stonebridge Park and Harlesden
- 1 May 1878: Renamed Harrow Road
- 1 October 1879: Renamed Harrow Road for Stonebridge and Harlesden
- 1 November 1880: Renamed Harrow Road for Stonebridge Park and Harlesden
- 1 July 1884: Renamed Stonebridge Park for West Willesden and Harlesden
- 2 July 1888: Closed
- 1 March 1893: Reopened
- 1 February 1901: Renamed Harlesden for West Willesden and Stonebridge Park
- 1 October 1902: Closed

Other information
- Coordinates: 51.5408°N 0.2566°W

Harlesden railway station was a station in northwest London on the south side of the southern section of a road called Craven Park, which is part of the A404 Harrow Road between Paddington and Wembley. The station was sometimes known as Harrow Road or as Stonebridge Park.

It was opened by the Midland Railway on the Dudding Hill Line on 3 August 1875, partly to service the neighbouring exclusive Craven Park Estate.

Originally named Harrow Road for Stonebridge Park and West Willesden, the station was renamed several times: on 1 February 1876 it became Harrow Road for Stonebridge Park and Harlesden; on 1 May 1878 Harrow Road; on 1 October 1879 Harrow Road for Stonebridge and Harlesden; on 1 November 1880 Harrow Road for Stonebridge Park and Harlesden; and on 1 July 1884 Stonebridge Park for West Willesden and Harlesden. The station was closed on 2 July 1888.

It was reopened on 1 March 1893, and on 1 February 1901 it was renamed again, becoming Harlesden for West Willesden and Stonebridge Park. It was finally closed to passengers for a second time on 1 October 1902, after a sustained campaign by local people. The neighbouring goods sidings were in use for coal deliveries until the 1960s. The street level station buildings were demolished in the 1960s. The former goods office still stood in 2010, although the interior and much of the roof was destroyed in a fire in December 2009. Some platform edges remain, although most were removed when the railway embankment was pinned to stop slippage in 2001.

The Dudding Hill Line remains in use for freight services today. The station stood on the later 1855 straightening of this road, which meant the railway had to be built under two roads of the same name.

It should not be confused with Harlesden station, an existing Network Rail station, some three or four hundred metres south, served by Bakerloo line and London Overground trains.

Preceding station	Disused railways	Following station
Acton Central; Line open, station open	Midland Railway; Dudding Hill Line	Dudding Hill; Line open, station closed

== Re-opening proposals ==
Harlesden station features in the North and West London Light Railway proposal which has been promoted by the Campaign for Better Transport. A new light rail station is suggested for the other side of the road, between the two Craven Park road bridges.

R25 Proposals

In 2014 plans by Boris Johnson for an orbital railway around London were released with a stop at Harlesden using the old Dudding Hill Line to link up with Cricklewood and would stop at Harlesden.

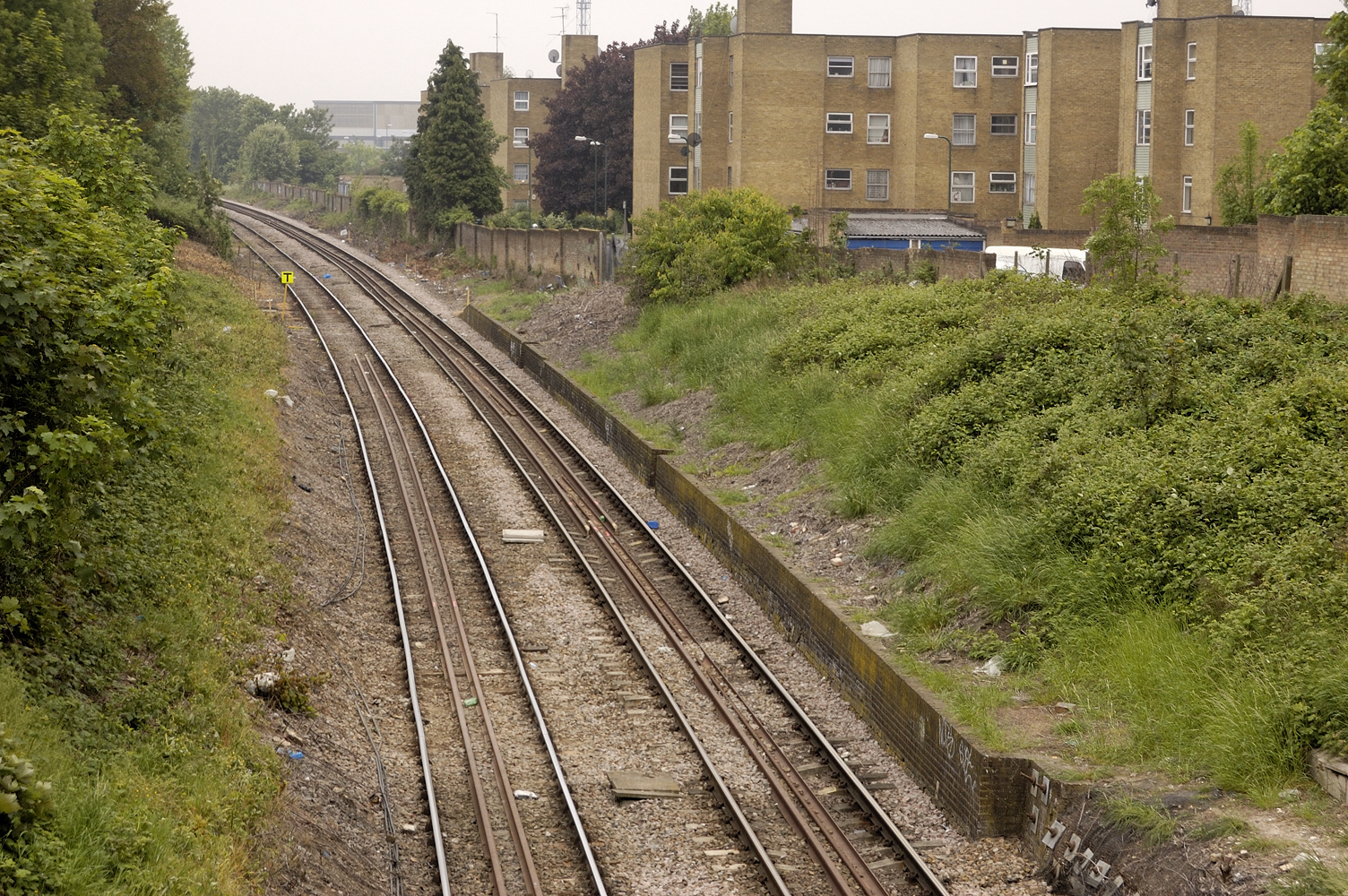
The Dudding Hill Line passing through Harlesden station

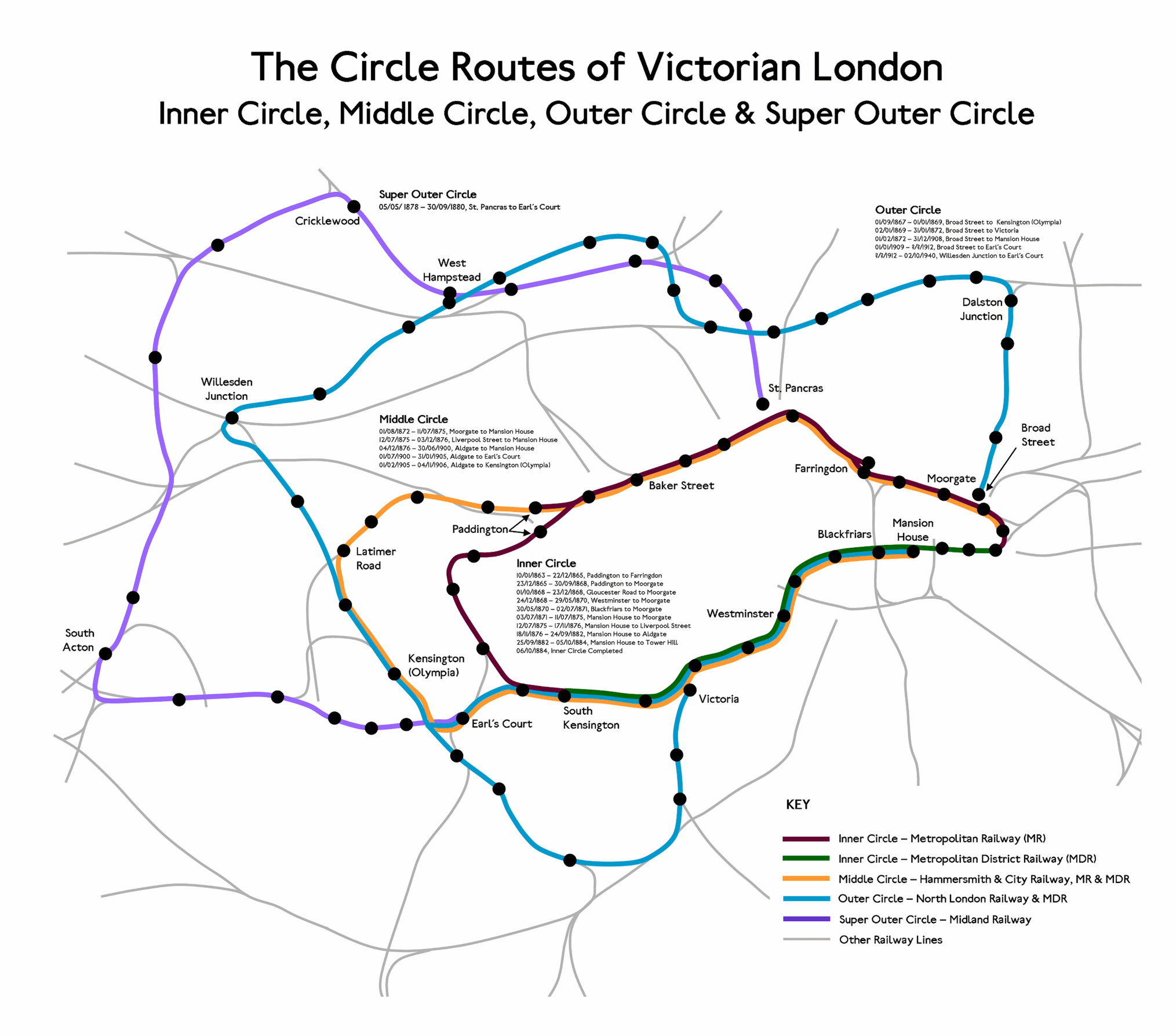
The Victorian Super Outer Circle route. Harlesden (Midland) station is on the middle left, to the left of "Willesden Junction"

== See also ==
Super Outer Circle
