= Dudding (surname) =

Dudding is a British surname. Notable people with the surname include:

- Liam Dudding (born 1994), New Zealand cricketer
- Robin Dudding (1935–2008), New Zealand literary editor and journalist
- Rodger Dudding (born 1937), British business magnate
