= Jerusha Davidson Richardson =

British philanthropist and author (1864–1938)

Mrs Aubrey Richardson
- Born: Jerusha Hunting; 10 August 1864; Paddington, England
- Died: 8 February 1938 (aged 73); Maida Vale, England
- Education: Boarding school
- Occupations: Writer, hospital commandant, organiser
- Spouse: Aubrey Richardson

Jerusha Davidson Richardson OBE born Jerusha Hunting known as Mrs Aubrey Richardson (10 August 1864 – 8 February 1938) was a British philanthropist and author. In the first part of her life she was a writer known for recommending that women should not become suffragettes desperate for power but that they should devote their time to good works. In the latter half of her life she did just that and she was appointed an OBE.

== Life ==
Richardson was born in Paddington in 1864.

She married a solicitor named Aubrey Richardson on 20 May 1893. He was one of the three children of Mary (born Smith) and Sir Benjamin Ward Richardson. Her father in law was a doctor and leading sanitary inspector. Aubrey died early and left her a childless widow.

In 1899, she published a book of biographies of the Women of the English Court. She noted that men had the political power but recently women could aspire to humanitarian and religious activities during the book's introduction.

In 1908, she published another book of women's biographies titled Women of the Church of England. This book is recognised as making an early contribution to the emerging importance of women's history.

She wrote her last book about the Doges of Venice in 1914. Up to this date, she had become a writer known for recommending that women should not aspire for power but that they should devote their time to good works. In the latter half of her life, she did just that. At a hospital for wounded soldiers she became the quartermaster. She was promoted as the commandant of Voluntary Aid Detachment number 58 and she opened in February 1916 a new auxiliary military hospital at Dollis Hill House. It was one of several auxiliary hospitals for the Endell Street Military Hospital. The new hospital had 27 beds but it was expanded to 70 beds using huts. The position of the building is still marked. The Dorris Hill hospital closed in April 1919 and Richardson decided to open her own clinic in Willesden. Doctors would send their patients to what became a surgery. By the 1930s, it was known for its work with rheumatism. She retired in 1935.

She was appointed an OBE.

Richardson died at her home in 1938 in Maida Vale.
