= Rodger Dudding =

British business magnate

- Born: Rodger Ian Dudding; 21 December 1937 (age 88)
- Other names: Mr Lock Up; RD
- Occupations: Founder and owner, Dudrich Holdings; Managing Director, Lonsto International; Owner, Studio 434
- Spouse: Gloria Dudding (m. 1960; died 2013)

Rodger Ian Dudding (born 21 December 1937) is a British business magnate in the self-storage industry. Nicknamed "Mr Lock Up" by customers and "RD" by staff, Dudding owns more than 12,000 garages and as of February 2015 was worth an estimated £162 million, making him "the largest private owner of garages" in the United Kingdom.

In 2015 The Sunday Times recognized Dudding on its Sunday Times Rich List 2015 of the wealthiest British residents.

== Early life ==
Dudding started entrepreneurial activities as a child; in the years following World War II, he "bred rabbits and sold them to the local butcher" among other "moneymaking activities". From 1954 to 1959, he entered an apprenticeship with the British Royal Navy and received training in mechanical engineering until leaving the service due to injury. In 2015 The Daily Telegraph recognized Dudding as #27 on its list of the "Top 40 richest former apprentices".

== Career ==
=== Early career ===
After leaving the Royal Navy, Dudding worked in sales and marketing positions for the Rembrandt/Rothmans Cigarette group from 1959 through 1967. He worked at American Machine and Foundry from 1967 until 1970, where he was promoted from sales to vice president. Dudding founded Lonsto International Limited in 1970, a queue management system manufacturer and installer. He continues to manage Lonsto, which accounts for 30% of his group's revenues.

=== Self-storage ===
Dudding entered the self-storage industry in the early 1970s, when he purchased ten lock-up units from his landlord, a "wealthy property owner and friend". These first units were located near Croydon in south London. Dudding says he was at first "unenthused by the deal", but his opinion changed as he began to receive rental income from the garages. To expand his holdings, Dudding began visiting garage blocks and, under the pretence of being "interested in renting another unit on the block", asked tenants stopping by their units who they rented from. Using this information, he would contact the owners and offer to buy units for 20% more than they were selling for.

He later founded Dudrich (Holdings) Ltd. in London which as of October 2013 earns $12 million in annual revenues.

Today, Dudding owns properties throughout England. When discussing other contributors to his success, Dudding describes the importance of promptly evicting tenants for failure to pay and keeping his prices low to minimize delinquency. Dudding admits that he is "in regular contact with the police" due to the use of storage units in criminal activities, including hiding stolen goods, drug factories, counterfeiting, and disposing of murder victims, in addition to suicide and "extramarital liaisons".

=== Other enterprises ===
Dudding also runs a development business that builds "between five and 25 properties" per year on his self-storage sites.

=== Car collection and Studio 434 ===
Dudding is a car collector and owns more than 420 cars, including 24 Aston Martin Lagondas and 200 classic cars. The collection was covered by the British car magazine Top Gear in 2011. With over 400 cars, Dudding believes it is Europe's largest private collection of classic cars. To make the collection pay for its upkeep, he created Studio 434 Ltd in Potters Bar, which both stores and maintains all of the vehicles, and arrange the rental of cars to the film and television industry.

== Personal life ==
Dudding married Gloria in 1960, she died in 2013.
