= Dudding Hill line =

Railway line in northwest London

Coordinates: 51.556929°N 0.234017°W

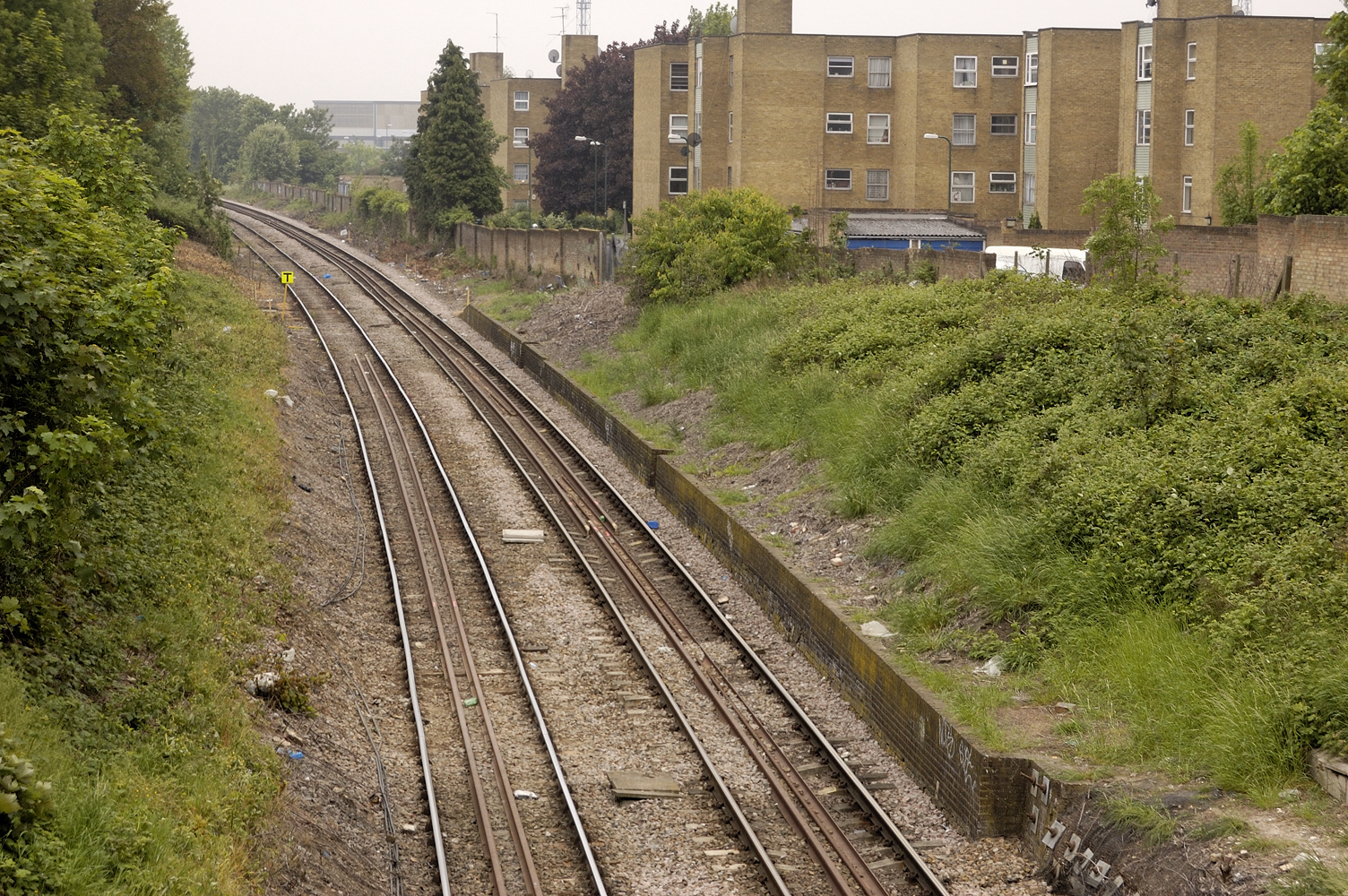
- The Dudding Hill Line passing through Harlesden station

Overview
- Owner: Network Rail
- Locale: Greater London
- Termini: Cricklewood and Brent Curve Junctions; Acton Wells Junction
- Stations: 0 (2 stations closed)

Service
- Type: Freight railway

History
- Opened: 1875
- Closed: 1902 (passenger services)

Technical
- Line length: 4 mi (6.4 km)
- Num of tracks: Double track throughout
- Track gauge: 4 ft 8 1/2 in (1,435 mm) standard gauge
- Operating speed: 30 mph (48 km/h)

The Dudding Hill line (or Dudding Hill loop) is a railway line in west and north-west London running from Acton to Cricklewood. It is roughly 4 miles (6.4 km) long, with a 30 miles per hour (48 km/h) speed limit, and semaphore signalling. The line has no scheduled passenger service, no stations, and is not electrified. It is lightly used by freight trains and, very occasionally, passenger charter trains.

== Route ==
Map of line.

The southernmost point of the Dudding Hill line is in Acton, where it branches north from the North London line between Acton Central and Willesden Junction stations, immediately to the west of the site of the proposed Old Oak Common High Speed 2 station. From there it heads north then east, passing through Gladstone Park and terminating at a triangular junction with the Midland Main Line between Cricklewood and Hendon.

There are intermediate junctions with the West Coast Main Line from the south at Harlesden and the Chiltern Main Line from the south at Neasden.

== History ==
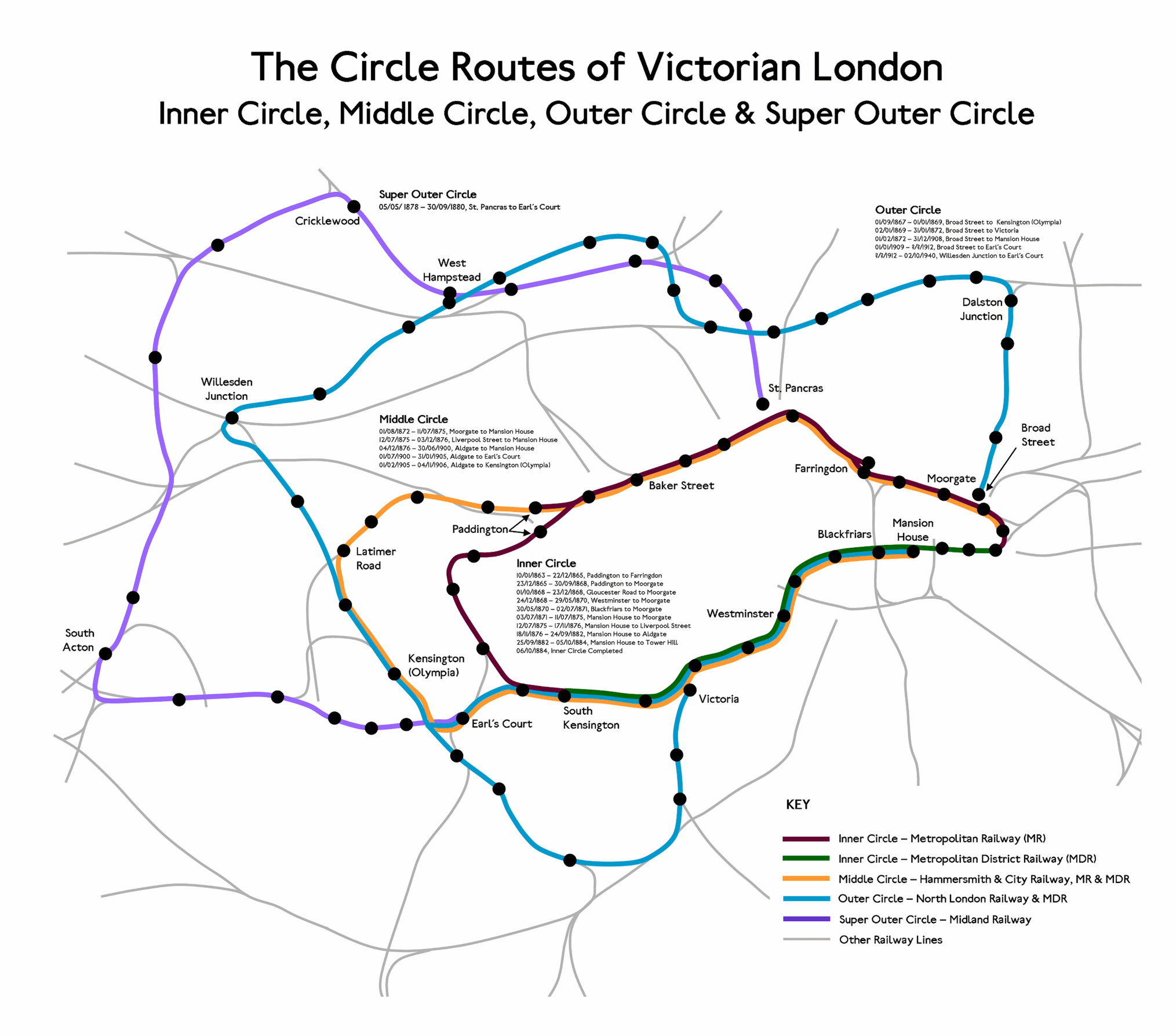
The Victorian Super Outer Circle route. The Dudding Hill line is the curved line at the top-left

The line was opened through open countryside on 1 October 1868 (goods) and 3 August 1875 (passengers) as the Midland and South Western Junction Railway (M&SWJR), as part of the Midland Railway's extension to London. It connected the Midland Main Line, and what would become its large Cricklewood goods yard, to the North and South Western Junction Railway, now part of the North London line, at Acton Wells (an area now called North Acton). It had stations at Dudding Hill and Harlesden (the latter also called Harrow Road and Stonebridge Park).

Midland and South-western Junction Railway Act 1864
- Act of Parliament
- Parliament of the United Kingdom
- Long title: An Act to authorize the Construction of a Railway in Middlesex, to be called "The Midland and South-western Junction Railway."
- Citation: 27 & 28 Vict. c. cxc

Dates
- Royal assent: 14 July 1864

Text of statute as originally enacted

The M&SWJR was authorised on 14 July 1864 by the Midland and South-western Junction Railway Act 1864 (27 & 28 Vict. c. cxc) and absorbed by the Midland Railway on 30 July 1874. Confusingly, the similar name Midland and South Western Junction Railway was later used for a completely different railway in Gloucestershire, which was eventually taken over by the Great Western Railway.

From 1878 to 1880 it formed the basis of the Midland Railway's Super Outer Circle, which ran from St Pancras to Earl's Court via Cricklewood, Acton and the District line. Various other, shorter routes were then used, but passenger demand was low, and it was closed to regular passenger traffic in 1902.

During World War II, air-raid shelters were constructed within the embankment.

Although railway usage is almost always "Dudding Hill Railway", the geographical area is usually called "Dudden Hill", and there is a London Borough of Brent electoral ward of that name. Dudden Hill is named after a Saxon settler called Dodda. The earliest known record, as Dodynghill, dates from 1544. "Dudding Hill" has been regarded historically as the more genteel spelling of the name.

The line became an important freight line, and southwest-to-northwest chords were later added to the West Coast Main Line at Harlesden, and what is now called the Chiltern Main Line (originally the Great Central Railway) at Neasden. War-time traffic was particularly heavy.

At various times, summer special trains were run on the Dudding Hill Line, to carry holidaymakers from the Midlands to south coast holiday resorts.

== Current use ==
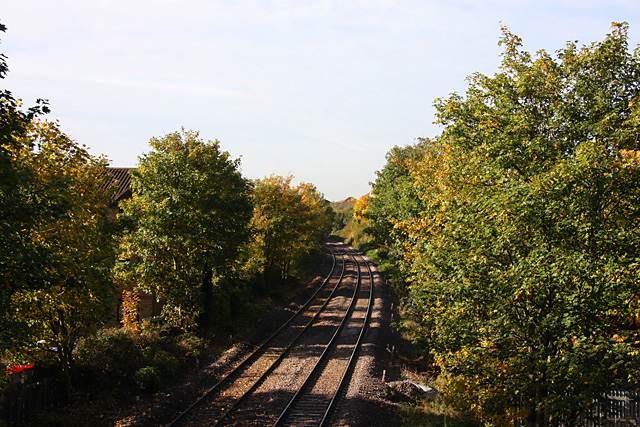
Site of Dudding Hill station in October 2009

Nowadays the freight traffic is perhaps a dozen trains a day each way. The line is hardly mentioned in the April 2007 Network Rail Freight Route Utilisation Strategy report, or the August 2007 London Rail 'Rail Freight Strategy' report.

The main traffic is aggregates (including to a cement depot at Neasden) and compacted household waste from depots at Brent Cross and Dagenham to the land-fill site at Calvert in Buckinghamshire.

The line is still authorised for passenger services. Very occasionally, it is used for chartered passenger trains, including Pullman heritage coaches.

In 2009, the track received considerable maintenance in parts, including complete track and ballast removal and replacement.

Chiltern Railways use the line to take faulty rolling stock to Willesden Depot via Neasden Junction, accessible from the "up" line at Wembley Stadium.

== Development proposals ==
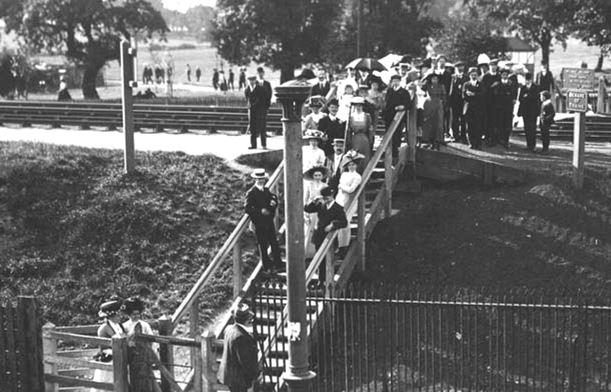
Crossing the Dudding Hill line in late Victorian times, near the eastern end of Dudding Hill station, and at the western end of Gladstone Park

=== Crossrail ===
In 1990 Crossrail plans were announced by Secretary of State of Transport Cecil Parkinson, which would have seen trains using part of the line to reach the Chiltern line to Aylesbury. A new viaduct would have run alongside the Grand Union Canal from Old Oak Common to Harlesden, and the first stop out of Paddington station would have been Wembley Park, for connections to the Metropolitan line and Jubilee line. Later plans replaced all this with a new tunnel connection, and finally the Aylesbury branch was dropped completely from the scheme.

=== Heathrow Express ===
During the late 1990s, BAA planned to run some or possibly all Heathrow Express trains along the line to St. Pancras.

=== Campaign for Better Transport proposal ===
In early 2008, the London Group of the Campaign for Better Transport published a plan for a North and West London Light Railway. The line has been identified by Campaign for a Better Transport as a candidate for reopening.

=== High Speed North ===
In July 2008, a high-speed rail network was proposed by the 2M Group, a campaigning group representing people affected by Heathrow Airport expansion, as an alternative to increased air traffic. A rail route running from Heathrow to Cambridge would connect with the Midland Main Line at a "Cricklewood Interchange" station, using new track north from Heathrow to Ruislip, then the Great Central Line (nowadays the Chiltern main line) to Neasden, then a short northernmost section of the Dudding Hill Line from Neasden to Brent Cross.

After several independent efforts, in early 2009 the British Government began an official detailed study of possible high-speed rail routes.

=== London Overground proposal ===
In June 2013, the Mayor of London and the London Boroughs of Brent, Ealing and Hammersmith & Fulham released 'vision' consultation documents about the Old Oak Common area of west London. This involves a major development area for London, based around a new Old Oak Common station for High Speed 2 and Great Western Main Line, including Crossrail.

The vision mentions various connections to the Transport for London London Overground system, connecting Old Oak to the North London Line, West London Line, and two new branches, to Hounslow, and via the Dudding Hill Line to Thameslink stations on the Midland Main Line.

=== APPG proposal ===
In October 2016, a report by Jonathan Manns and Dr Nicholas Falk, on behalf of the UK Government's All Party Parliamentary Group for London's Planning and Built Environment, proposed new orbital rail links in West London modelled on Swift Rail or Rapid Transit, connecting existing communities and those which could accommodate additional growth. It encouraged West London Business (West London Alliance) to reconsider work it had commissioned in 2001 which flagged the scope to connect Old Oak Common and Brent Cross along the Dudding Hill line. This connection was supported in addition to smaller connections using underused or unused existing connections.

It was agreed at the following meeting of the West London Economic Prosperity Board, in December 2016, to undertake further analysis on the feasibility of establishing an orbital passenger rail connecting regeneration schemes. The findings were presented in June 2017, on the basis of which the Board voted to progress engagement with the Mayor of London around a West London Orbital. The Mayor put forward a proposal to work with the West London Alliance and others to deliver a West London Orbital in March 2018, following publication by the West London Alliance of a proposal.

=== West London Orbital Railway proposal ===
Map of the proposed West London Orbital route

In 2017, the West London Alliance – a partnership of the London Boroughs of Barnet, Brent, Ealing, Hammersmith and Fulham, Harrow, Hillingdon and Hounslow – put forward a West London Orbital proposal to reinstate passenger services on the Dudding Hill line to create a new suburban route across West London.

The proposal has been supported by Transport for London, and a public consultation was launched in 2026 on a proposed new London Overground route from Hendon to Hounslow, which would include new stations at Neasden and Harlesden, and an interchange at Old Oak Common Lane railway station with the Elizabeth line and the Overground Mildmay line.

On the Midland Main Line new platforms would be built at Hendon and at Cricklewood and West Hampstead, while the Hendon service could also call at Brent Cross West. The West Hampstead branch would be complete by 2026 and the Hendon branch by 2029 with 4 trains per hour on each branch end. The project's benefit-to-cost ratio is estimated to be in excess of 50:1.

== Historical maps ==
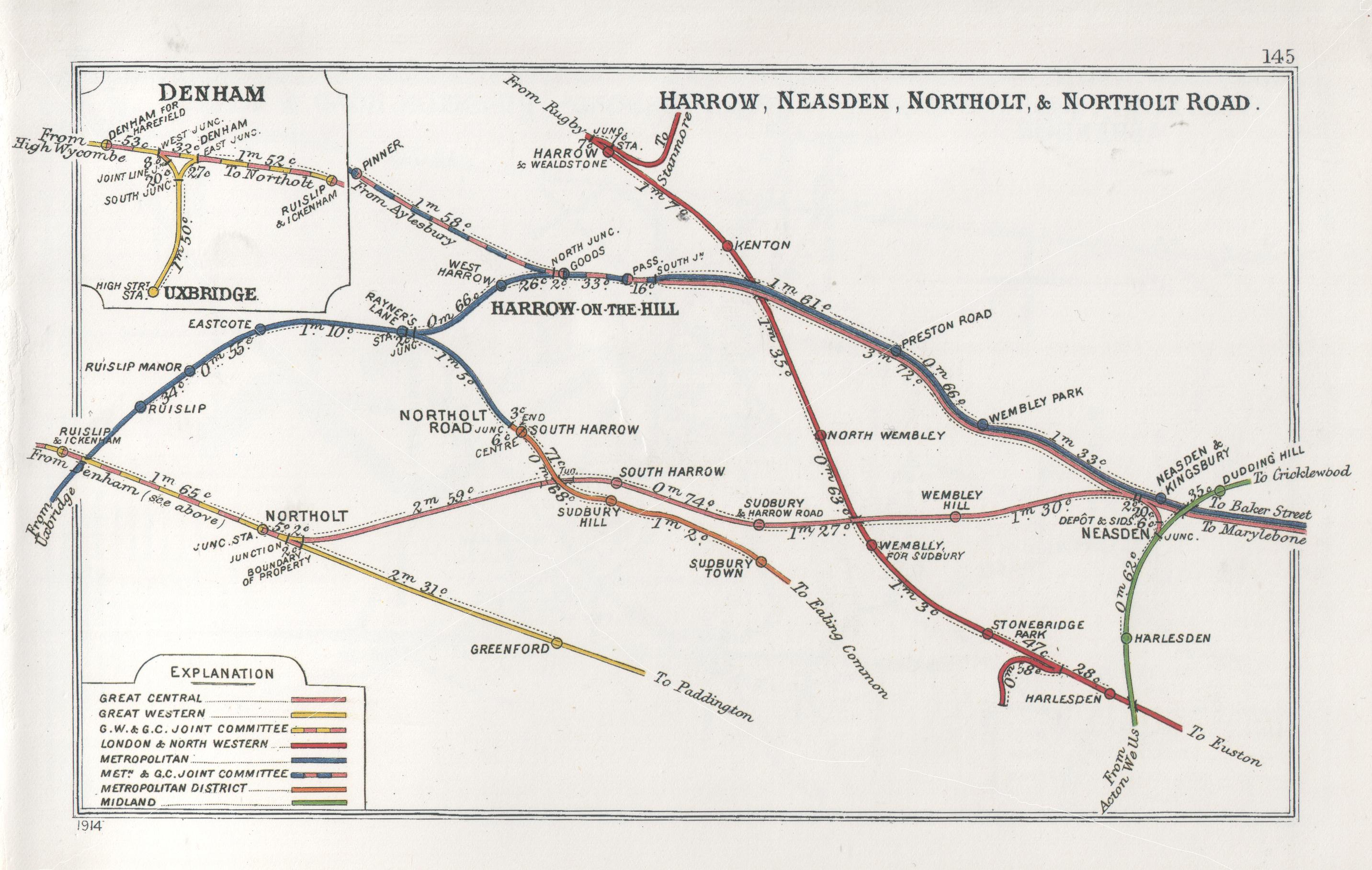
The line at Neasden

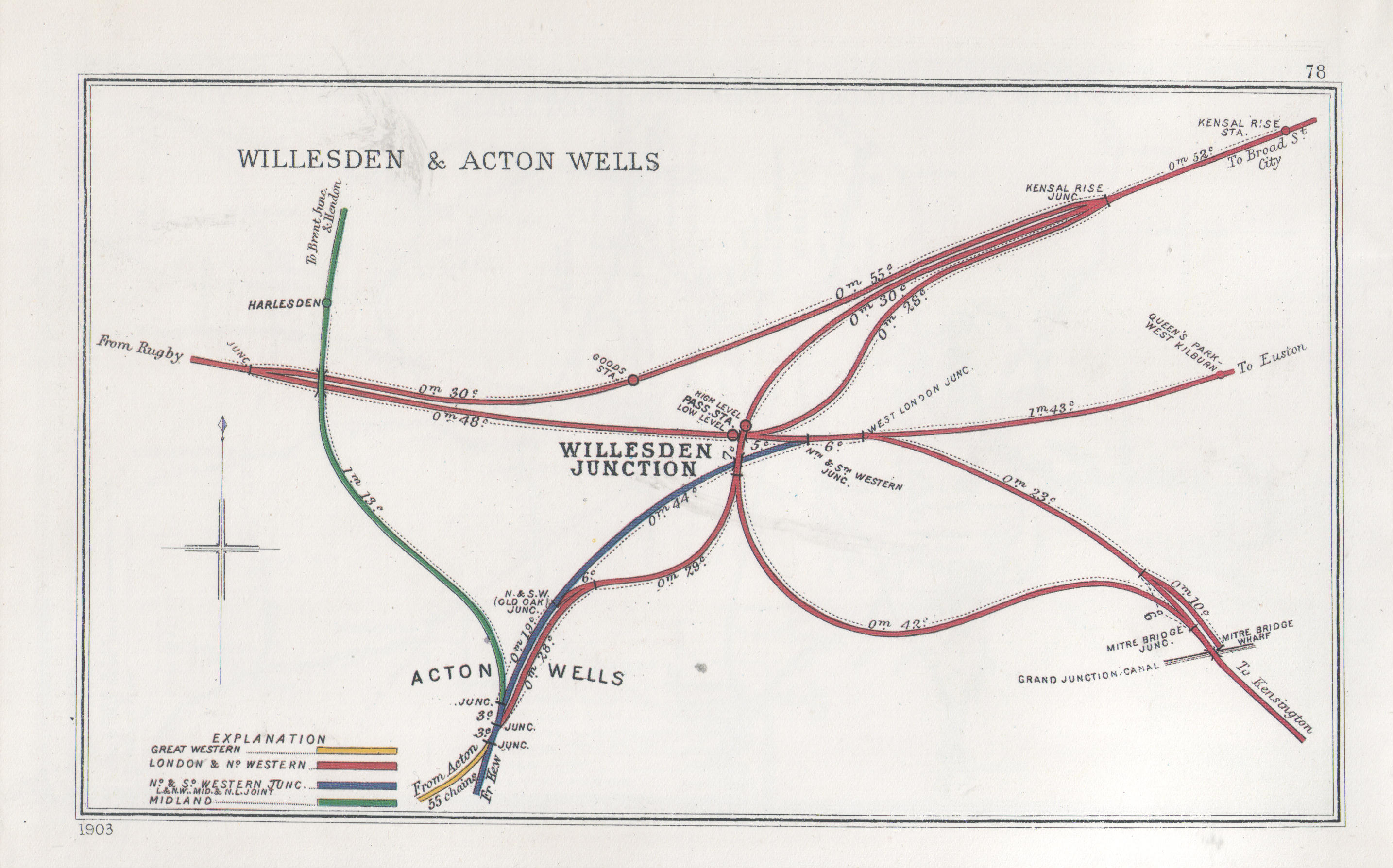
The southern junction at Acton

== See also ==
- Heathrow Airport transport proposals
