= Mark Gottsche =

Irish Gaelic footballer

Mark Göttsche
Personal information
- Born: 1987 (age 38–39) Galway, Ireland
- Height: 1.88 m (6 ft 2 in)

Sport
- Sport: Gaelic football
- Position: Midfield
Clubs
- Years: Club
- 2005–2011 2011–: Oranmore-Maree; Tír Chonaill Gaels
Inter-county
- Years: County
- 2008 2011–2019: Galway; London

Mark Göttsche is a Gaelic footballer. He played inter-county football for Galway from minor to senior levels. He then played with London.

== Early life ==
Göttsche was born in Germany where his father Jürgen was from. His father read the GAA rulebook and became a passionate supporter of Gaelic games, passing his fascination with the game on to his son. When Göttsche was five years of age his family moved to Oranmore. While at NUI Galway studying for a Commerce degree he played in the Sigerson Cup. While at UUJ studying for a Master's in Sports Management he also played in the Sigerson Cup. He played for the Galway Senior team in their 2008 National Football League game against Kildare.

== London ==
Göttsche moved to London in mid-2011 and began playing for London. In 2011, London came close to beating Mayo in the Connacht Senior Football Championship - the game went to extra-time before Mayo escaped. In 2012, they lost to Leitrim by one point.

On 26 May 2013, Göttsche was man of the match in London's 1-12 - 0–14 victory over Sligo - their first victory in the competition since 1977. He was later awarded the GAA's Player of the Month award for May. Göttsche lined out for London in the Connacht semi final three weeks later but was substituted early in the first half. It transpired that Göttsche was struggling with a long-term injury which required surgery. Göttsche went under the knife on 4 July 2013 and missed the remainder of the 2013 season including London's first ever Connacht Final appearance.

Göttsche returned to the London colours at the beginning of the 2014 National Football League, playing in every one of London's league games. He started for London against his native Galway in the Connacht Championship in May 2014 which ended in a heavy defeat for London. Injury prevented Göttsche starting against Limerick in the All Ireland qualifiers, however was introduced as a substitute after 10 minutes with London trailing by 7 points. Göttsche inspired London's comeback which saw them lead by two points with five minutes remaining. However having come from behind the superior fitness of Limerick proved a telling factor and Limerick ran out two point winners.

Göttsche announced his retirement from inter-county football in 2019, and took up the role of finance and operations manager with Galway GAA.

He has also been Secretary and Treasurer of London GAA.

Club

Göttsche has won four London County Senior Football Championship medals (2012, 2014, 2015, 2018) with Tir Chonaill Gaels picking up the man of the match award in the 2012 and 2014 finals and captaining the team in 2012 & 2018.
