= Dudding Hill railway station =

Former railway station in England

Dudding Hill
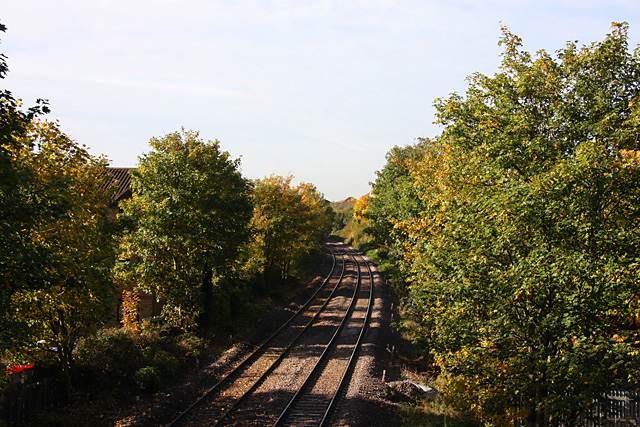
- Former station location
- Interactive map of Dudding Hill

General information
- Location: Willesden
- Local authority: London Borough of Brent
- Owner: Midland Railway
- Number of platforms: 2

Key dates
- 1875: Opened
- 1888: Closed
- 1893: Opened
- 1902: Closed
- Replaced by: none

Other information
- Coordinates: 51.554811°N 0.243266°W

Dudding Hill railway station was a station in Neasden, London NW2 on the Dudding Hill Line.

The station was opened in 1875 by the Midland Railway, originally as "Dudding Hill, for Willesden & Neasden". It closed to passengers in 1902, despite providing access to the neighbouring new Gladstone Park, and goods services ceased in 1964. Although the platforms were demolished, the station building survived into the 1980s, when the land was used for housing (Cornmow Drive was built on the site).

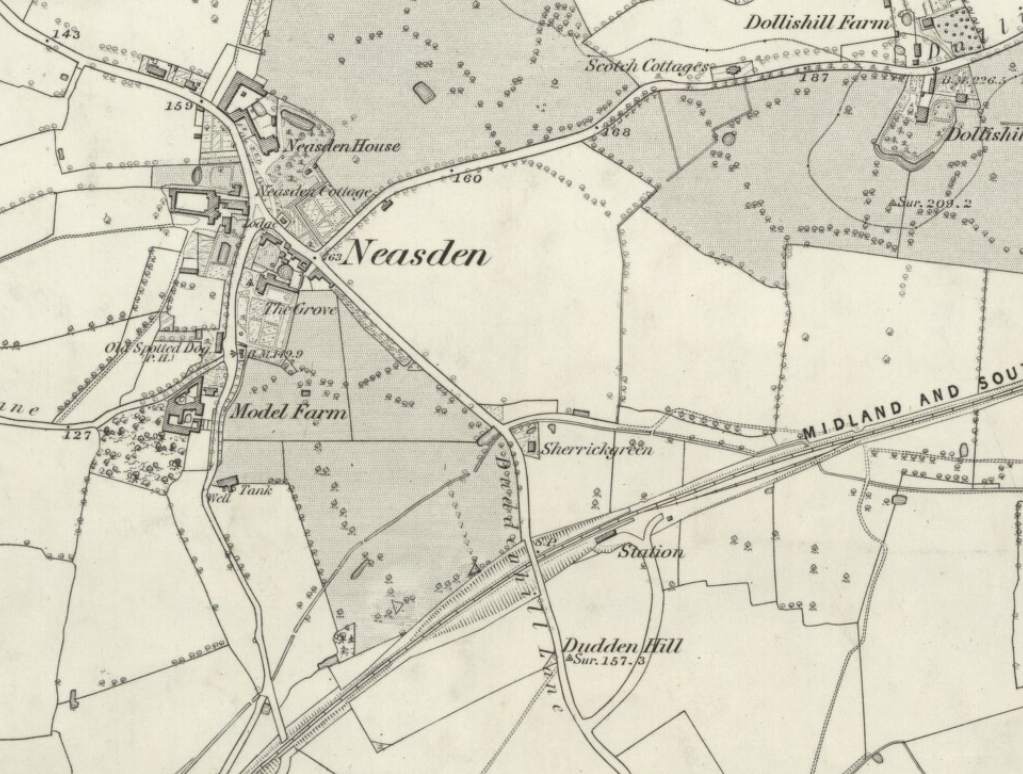
The station on an 1873 Ordnance Survey map

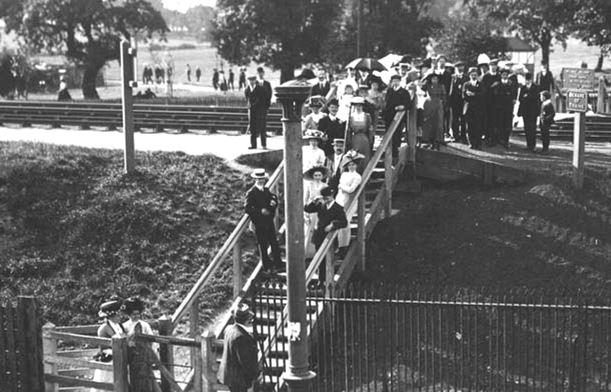
Crossing the Dudding Hill Line in late Victorian times, near the eastern end of Dudding Hill station, and at the western end of Gladstone Park

The Dudding Hill Line offers a connection between the North London Line at Acton and the Midland Main Line at Brent Cross and Cricklewood. It is now only used for freight, but has recently been incorporated into the proposed West London Orbital railway.

| Preceding station | Disused railways | Following station |
|---|---|---|
| Harlesden; Line open, station closed | Midland Railway; Dudding Hill Line | Cricklewood; Line open, station open |
