= Mohammed Mamdani =

British social entrepreneur and activist (born 1983)

Mohammed Sadiq Mamdani
- Mamdani speaking about poverty in September 2013
- Born: 8 February 1983 (age 43); London, England
- Education: Richmond College; University of Oxford; SOAS, University of London
- Occupation: Social entrepreneur
- Years active: 2001–present
- Organization: Kijana Kwanza (swahili)
- Known for: Social entrepreneurship within the Muslim Community
- Notable work: Muslim Youth Helpline; Ansar Youth Project; Al-Mizan Charitable Trust; Sufra NW London; Kijana Kwanza
- Website: kijana-kwanza.org sufra-nwlondon.org.uk almizantrust.org.uk ansaryouth.org.uk myh.org.uk

Mohammed Sadiq Mamdani (born February 1983) is a British social entrepreneur and activist, who is currently the UK Director of Kijana Kwanza. He is known for his extensive work in founding charitable organisations; including Muslim Youth Helpline, Ansar Youth Project, Al-Mizan Charitable Trust and Sufra NW London. Mamdani is an advocate on youth issues and community development, who is passionate about interfaith social action.

== Career ==
=== 2001-2005: Muslim Youth Helpline ===
Mohammed began his career in the voluntary sector at the age of 18 years whilst studying for his A-levels, when he founded the award-winning charity Muslim Youth Helpline in February 2001 from his bedroom. Today it is considered the British Muslim community's premier youth counselling service. It was at college that Mohammed first realised the extent of isolation that many young Muslims experience; while problems such as drug misuse, depression and sexuality are issues common among many young people, he believed that young Muslims often need advice that takes into account broader religious and social contexts, which is why he created the helpline.

After 4 years of building the organisation's infrastructure and helping to secure its financial base, Mamdani retired as a trustee of Muslim Youth Helpline. He was quickly appointed as a trustee of UnLtd - Foundation for Social Entrepreneurs, a charity that supports individuals with creative ideas to tackle social issues in their communities.

=== 2005-2009: Ansar Youth Project ===
Four years after Muslim Youth Helpline, Mamdani set up Ansar Youth Project, a community-based model in faith and culturally sensitive youth work as a response to the 7/7 London bombings. He had been the Head of Operations of Ansar Youth Project until 2009. Also, between 2005-2007 Mohammed was appointed to the Board of Trustees for UnLtd, the Foundation of Social Entrepreneurs.

During January 2010, Mamdani was employed as a building manager and Head of Youth Services at Queen's Crescent Community Association. Mamdani joined QCCA in an effort to increase his experience and knowledge on how to run charitable organisations, primarily those who support disadvantaged people. He wanted to set up organisations which tackle homelessness, food poverty in the United Kingdom, debt amongst other communal problems. Mamdani used his knowledge from QCCA to set up the initial charitable trust; Al-Mizan during the summer of 2011. Mamdani left QCCA in October 2011 to work closely with his newly found charity.

=== 2010-2013: Al-Mizan Charitable Trust ===

Mohammed Sadiq Mamdani, founded Al-Mizan Charitable Trust in October 2011. This became the UK's first Muslim grant-funder that supports individuals living in poverty, regardless of their faith or cultural background. Every month, the Trust receives more than 40 applications for financial support, of which only half of eligible applications can be supported with a grant or interest-free loan of up to £500.

Although the Trust prioritises applications which provide long-term benefit, rising poverty and unemployment has forced the charity to consider funding more and more applications for basic household and subsistence costs. The fundraising appeals are run in partnership with grassroots organisations, so that the packs reach the people who need them the most.

=== 2013–2018: Sufra NW London ===
Sufra was in talks by Mamdani back in 2011, however it wasn't pushed into establishment until late 2012, until eventually it was officially founded in April 2013. Sufra is an Arabic term meaning "Come to the table". The aim of the charity was to provide local people with food and even basic necessities and toiletries. Sufra was marketed as a Community Food Bank & Kitchen, which aims to support disadvantaged families suffering from food poverty in the local area. Sufra quickly became noted for being the first Muslim run charities that supports all backgrounds and ethnicities in the UK. Sufra began to run Food Academies in 2014, also becoming a local community centre aiming to bring the community together by running food academies and teaching people to cook. The main aim was to train young people between the ages of 16–25 years in basic cookery skills. Over 5 weeks and 10 intensive sessions it hopes to teach people to cook 10 home-cooked meals, understand nutrition and how to maintain a healthy diet. In addition to this, they run a master-chef competition and learn to manage weekly budgets with an accredited qualification, which can be used to apply for an apprenticeship or employment in the catering industry.

Brent Council approved the growing garden project growing garden in 2016. The garden project was located just a minute walk away from Sufra's main office and was named St. Raphael’s Edible Garden.

On 15 January 2019, Mamdani resigned from Sufra as the director.

=== 2019-Present: Kijana Kwanza (Young People First) ===
In January 2019, Mamdani launched Kijana Kwanza. Kijana Kwanza, which means Young People First in Swahili, is a youth organisation based in Moshi, Tanzania that promotes education, vocational training and life skills amongst young people. It is his first project outside of the UK. The charity was noted by Tanzania Daily News for donating 2,000 litres of hand-sanitiser amidst the COVID-19 pandemic in Tanzania. As of 2021, Mamdani has grown Kijana Kwanza to support disadvantaged young people in Tanzania, in particular orphans, street children and victims of child labour, with access to education and vocational and life skills training.

== Education ==
Mamdani's enrolled for Richmond upon Thames College in September 1999, located in South London from where he proceeded to Oxford to study Arabic with Islamic Studies. He took a year out from his undergraduate studies at Oxford University to pilot the Muslim Youth Helpline service. Mohammed graduated from St. John's College, Oxford in 2009. He studied towards a Master's in Arabic and Islamic Studies from SOAS, University of London a year after.

== Awards ==
His awards include Volunteer of the Year from BT & the Telephone Helplines Association (2003), Whitbread Youth Achievers Award (2004) and CSV Year of the Volunteer Medal for Innovation (2005). His citation for the Whitbread award noted, "Mohammed is an inspirational example of what young volunteers can do in their communities, through determination and commitment. This is a project that is making a real difference to hundreds of lives." Mamdani was added to The Independents "Good List" of 50 people in 2006, where Paul Vallely was involved in the selection process. In January 2015, Mamdani was one of 67 who had been awarded the Halifax Giving Extra Award. As well as receiving this reward, Sufra was entitled to receive £300 in bonus bond vouchers.

== Organisations ==
- Muslim Youth Helpline
- Ansar Youth Project
- Al-Mizan Charitable Trust
- Sufra NW London
- Kijana Kwanza (Young People First)
