= Sufra (disambiguation) =

Sufra is a type of surface from which food is eaten, and/or a ritual meal, in Islamicate cultures.

Sufra may also refer to:

- Sufra (charity), a charity based in London, England
- Al-Muhallab ibn Abi Sufra (c. 632–702, Khorasan), an Azdi Arab warrior and general
- Musawwarat es-Sufra, a large Meroitic temple complex in modern Sudan
