= St. Raphael's Edible Garden =

Community garden in London

Coordinates: 51.548781°N 0.267024°W

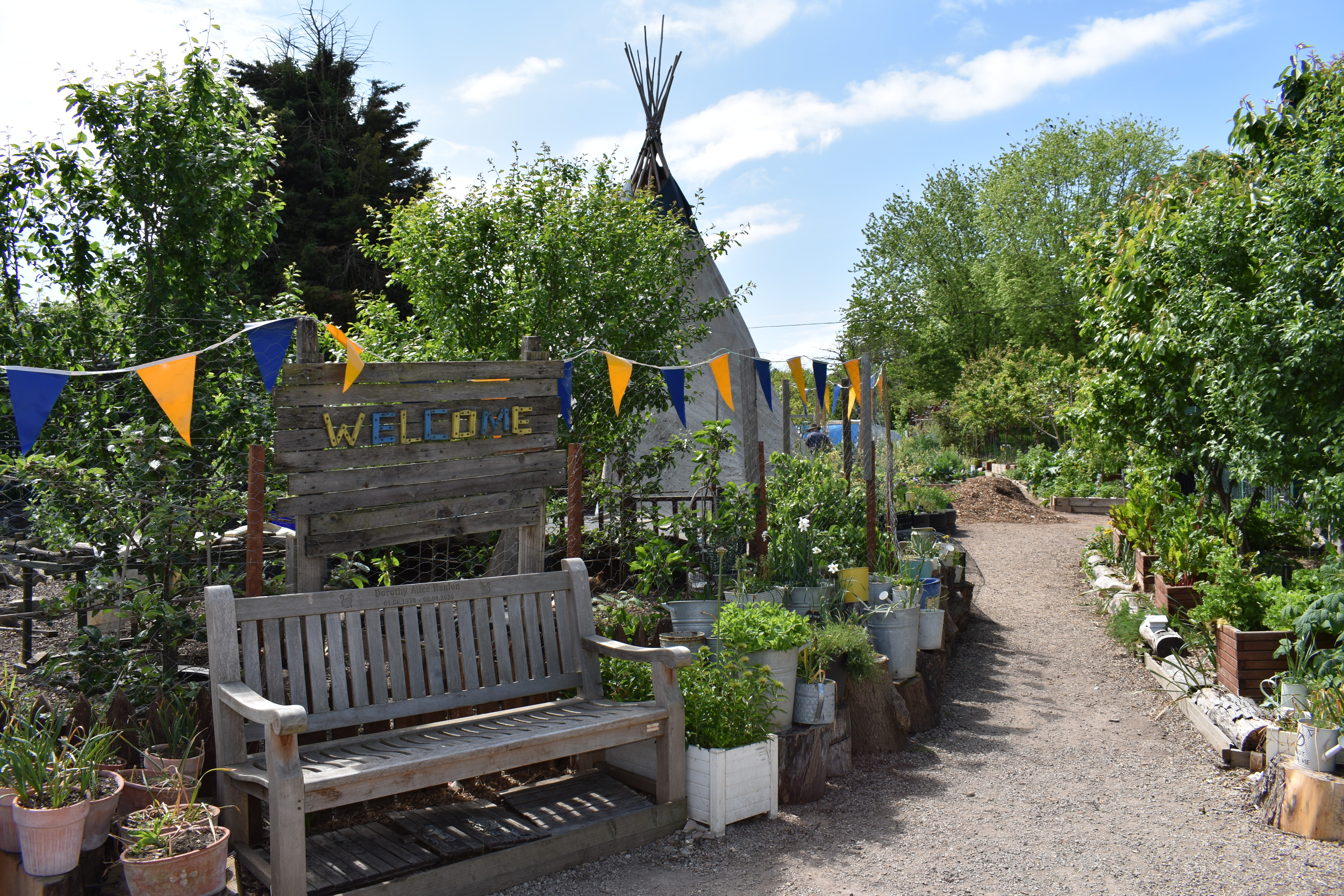
- The garden in 2022
- Interactive map of St. Raphael's Edible Garden
- Location: St. Raphael's, Brent, England
- Opened: 2016
- Public transit: Stonebridge Park; London Buses 232, 224
- Website: Official page on Sufra.

St. Raphael's Edible Garden is a community garden located in St. Raphael's, Neasden. The former derelict site was acquired by Sufra in 2016 and was granted permission to build a community garden project by the Brent Council in 2017. The garden is a private space for local residence and visitors as a space to learn and engage in community gardening activities.

== Background ==
The site used to be home to a council estate, which was demolished in 2013. This caused a brownfield land to be present in the St. Raphael's estate, which locals referred to as an “eyesore” which was prone to flytipping. Local residents decided to develop the site as a community garden.

In 2015, Sufra NW London was raising money for an edible garden in the area. It used several backings from different funds, including Joanna Lumley's support with Marks and Spencers' Spark Something Good Campaign. In an exclusive interview with the express, Lumley said: "I love the St. Raphael's edible garden project. St Raphael’s community in Brent is today creating an edible garden in the middle of their estate so they can bring the residents together and encourage a healthy lifestyle for all."

In 2016, Brent Council approved a growing garden project. The garden project was located just a minute walk away from Sufra's main office and was named St. Raphael's Edible Garden. The charity officially launched the project in March 2017 and runs a Growing Club twice a week on Wednesdays and Sundays from 10am to 2pm. The garden project featured numerous projects, including a Chicken Club, which teaches how to look after poultry.

In November 2016, Sufra was featured on episode 1 of BBC's The Big Food Rescue. Which followed two men on a mission to change Britain's food habits by rescuing the fresh food that supermarkets used to bin and getting it to the people who need it. It highlighted the use of the community garden and how it benefits local residents.

The community garden won £1000 in funding from Aviva Community Fund in 2017, this was used for resources such as seeds to kickstart the growing of edible plants. As of 2019, the garden has increased the number of people Sufra helps to 3000 annually. It was fully completed and officially opened in August 2019.

== Features ==
As of 2019, St. Raphael's Edible Garden currently has a tipi made of wooden poles and organic cotton that is used for outdoor cooking, a wildlife pond which has fish and other pond animals, and a chicken coop for the production of eggs. The garden also has raised beds and fruit trees and is managed and maintained by staff and volunteers. A greenhouse was also developed in the Garden for the growing of flowers and other botanics.

== Activities ==
- Creative Artisanal Workshop
- Growing Club
- Sami's Chicken Club
