= London Buses route 112 =

London bus route

112
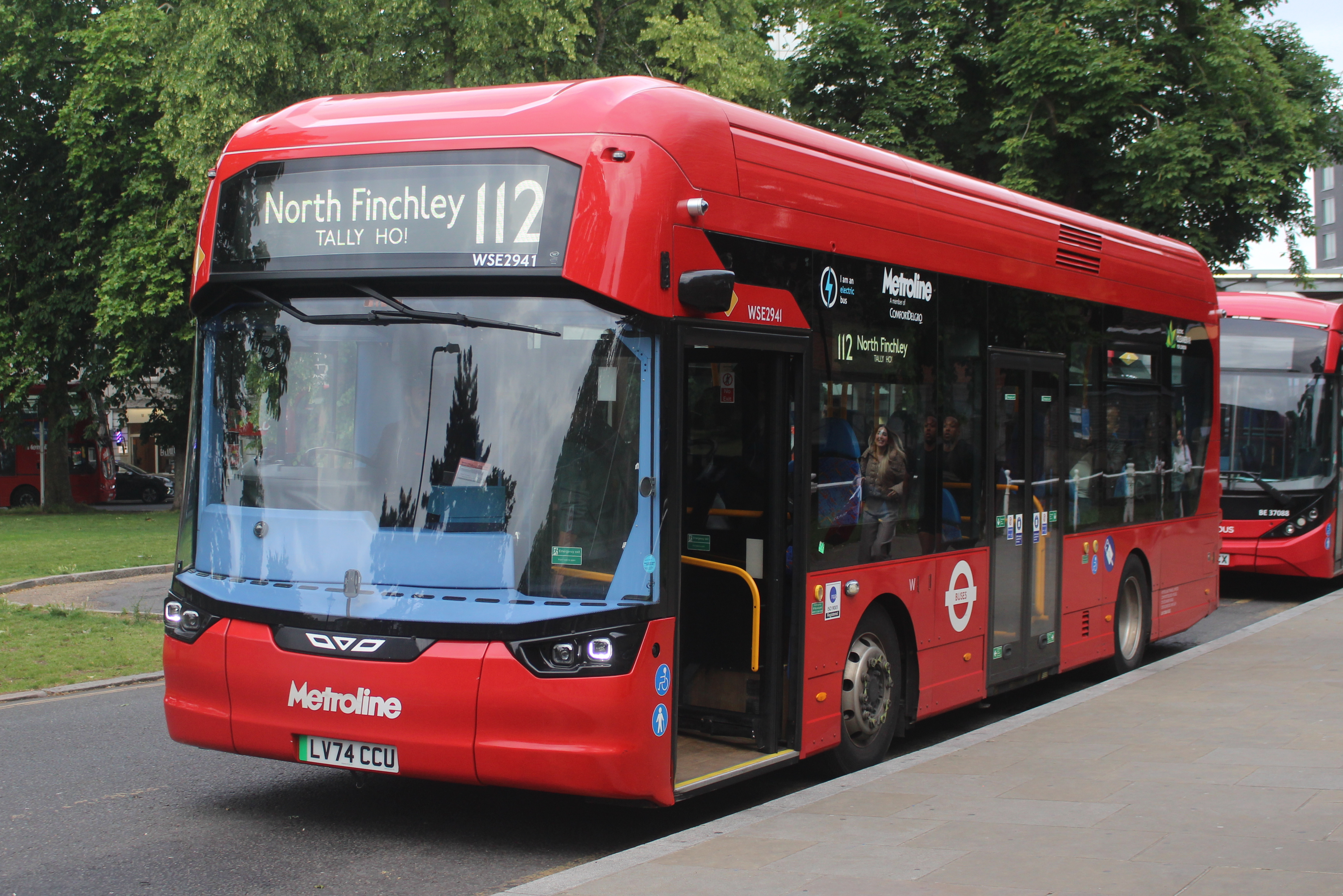
- Metroline Wright GB Kite Electroliner at Ealing Broadway station in June 2026

Overview
- Operator: Metroline
- Garage: Cricklewood
- Vehicles: Alexander Dennis Enviro200; Alexander Dennis Enviro200 MMC
- Peak vehicle requirement: 17

Route
- Start: North Finchley bus station
- Via: Brent Cross; Staples Corner; Neasden; Stonebridge Park; Hanger Lane
- End: Ealing Broadway station

London Buses route 112 is a Transport for London contracted bus route in London, England. Running between North Finchley bus station and Ealing Broadway station, it is operated by Metroline.

== History ==
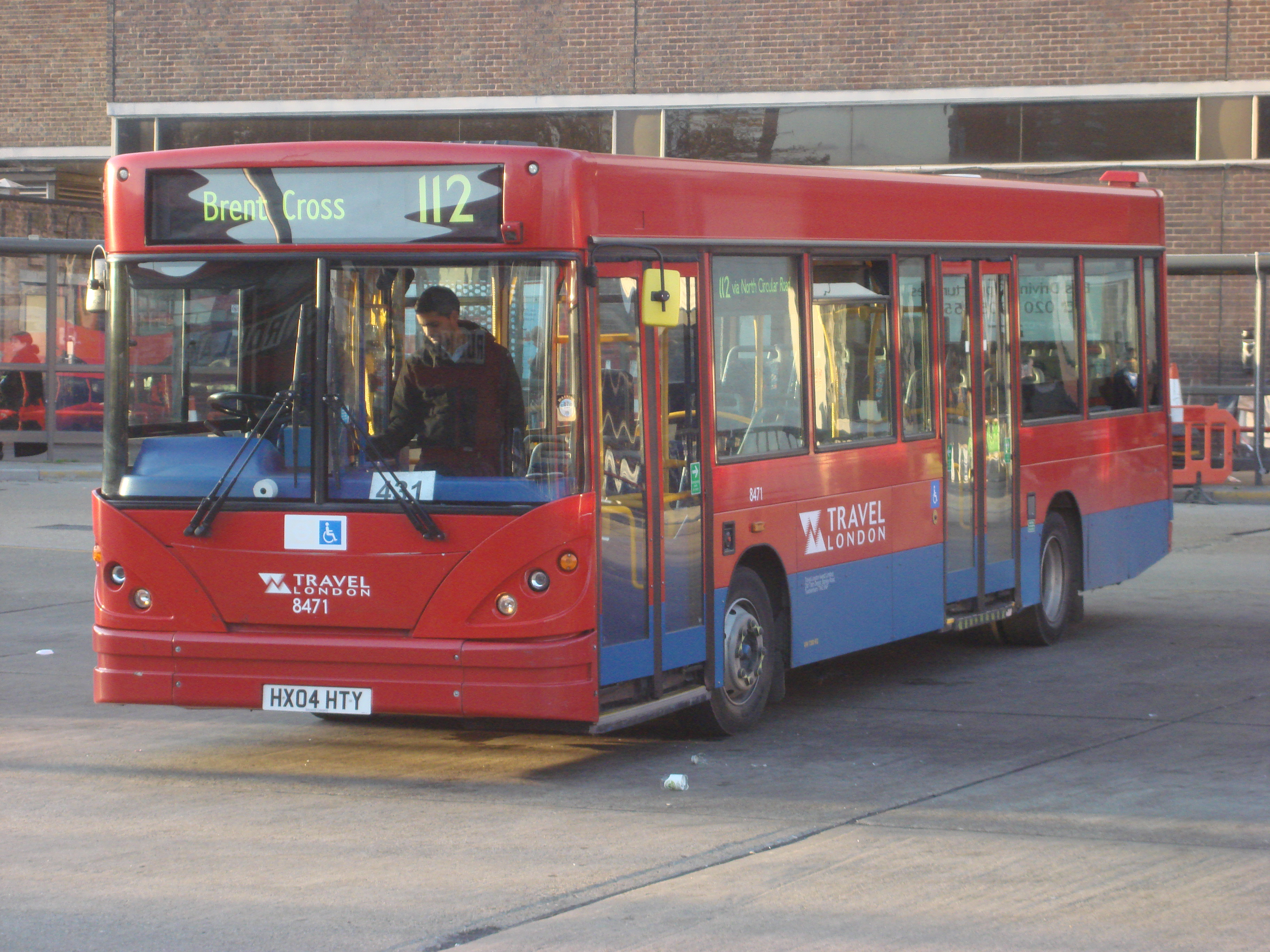
Travel London Caetano Nimbus bodied TransBus Dart SLF at Brent Cross bus station in October 2008

Route 112 was included in the June 1996 sale of R&I Coaches to MTL London, which in turn was bought out by Metroline in August 1998.

Route 112 was included in the sale of Tellings-Golden Miller's London bus routes to Travel London on 17 June 2005, which in turn was sold to Abellio London in May 2009.

Upon being re-tendered, on 2 August 2014 the route passed to Metroline. The route was extended from Brent Cross bus station to North Finchley bus station on 29 August 2020.

== Current route ==
Route 112 operates via these primary locations:

- North Finchley bus station
- Finchley Henlys Corner
- Brent Cross station
- Brent Cross bus station
- Staples Corner
- Neasden Shopping Centre
- Brent Park
- Stonebridge Park station
- Hanger Lane station
- North Ealing station
- Ealing Broadway station
