= London Buses route 16 =

London bus route

16
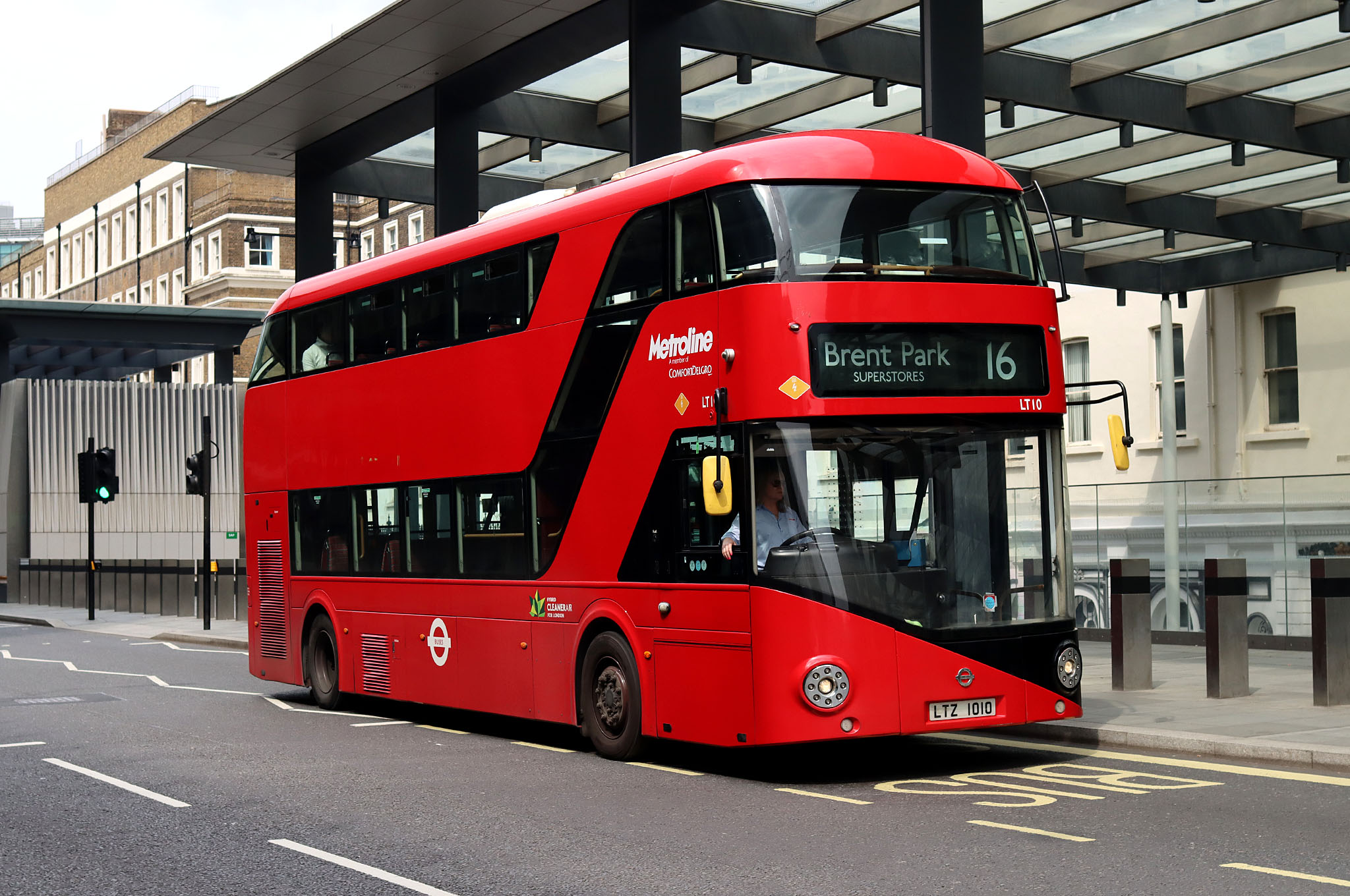
- Metroline New Routemaster at Paddington station in April 2023

Overview
- Operator: Metroline
- Garage: Cricklewood
- Vehicle: New Routemaster; Wright StreetDeck Electroliner; BYD BD11B
- Peak vehicle requirement: 15
- Night-time: N32

Route
- Start: Brent Park
- Via: Cricklewood; Kilburn; Maida Vale; Edgware Road
- End: Paddington station
- Length: 6 miles (9.7 km)

Service
- Level: Daily
- Frequency: Every 10 minutes
- Journey time: 33-55 minutes
- Operates: 05:00 until 00:30

London Buses route 16 is a Transport for London contracted bus route in London, England. Running between Brent Park and Paddington station, it is operated by Metroline.

== History ==
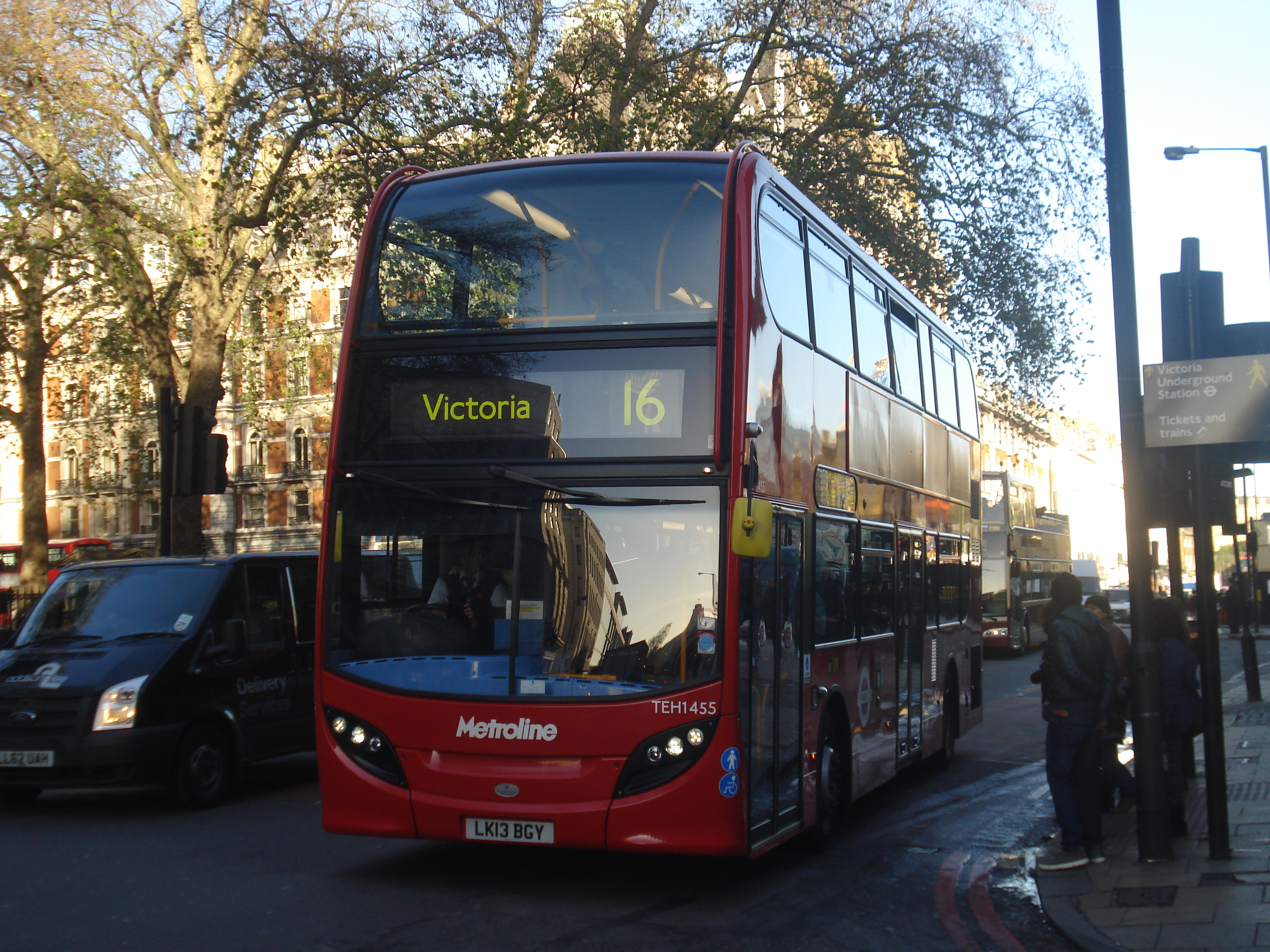
Metroline Alexander Dennis Enviro400H in Victoria in December 2013

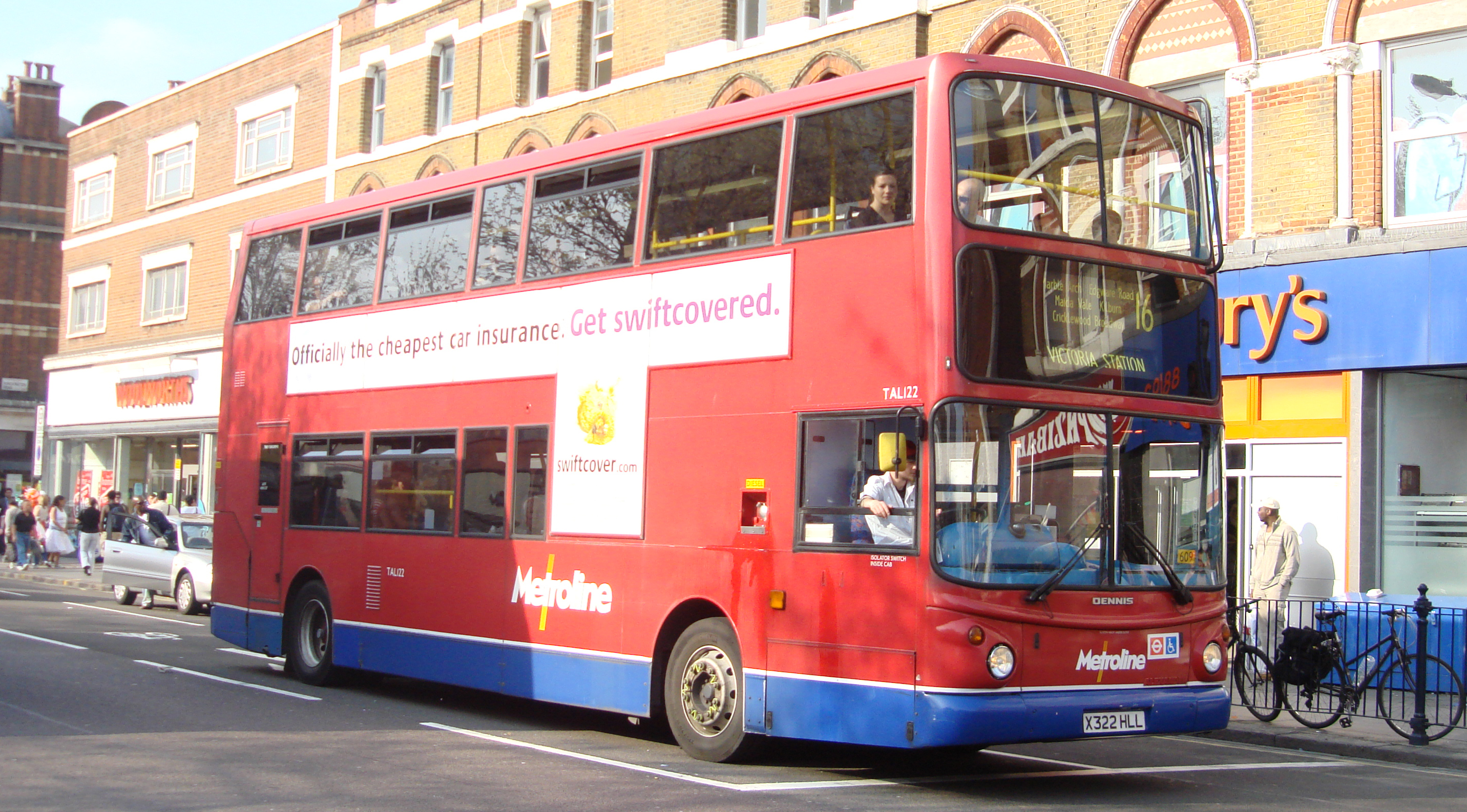
Metroline Alexander ALX400 bodied Dennis Trident 2 in April 2007

In 1970, the route was withdrawn between Neasden and Sudbury Town station. It was replaced by route 245.

In October 1997, the route was withdrawn between Cricklewood bus garage and Neasden. It was replaced by new route 316 at the same time.

On 13 October 2007, the frequency of the route was reduced to compensate for the introduction of new route 332 which commenced operating on the same date.

New Routemaster buses were introduced on 26 September 2015. The rear platform remains closed at all times except when the bus is at bus stops.

In 2021, the frequency of the service was reduced from 8 buses per hour to 6 during Monday-Saturday peak times, and from 6 buses per hour to 5 at other times.

In July 2022, Transport for London opened a public consultation on proposals for the route to be withdrawn as part of the Central London Buses Review. In November 2022, it was announced that the route would not be withdrawn but would instead run between Paddington and Brent Park, fully replacing route 332. This change was implemented on 29 April 2023.

== Current route ==
Route 16 operates via these primary locations:

- Brent Park Tesco
- Neasden Shopping Centre
- Cricklewood
- Kilburn station
- Brondesbury station
- Kilburn High Road station
- Maida Vale station Elgin Avenue
- Edgware Road station
- Paddington station
