= After Spring =

2016 documentary film

- Directed by: Ellen Martinez; Steph Ching
- Release date: 2016
- Country: United States

After Spring is a 2016 documentary film directed by Ellen Martinez and Steph Ching that follows two families of refugees living in Zaatari, the largest refugee camp for Syrians.

== Background ==
The film had its world premiere at the 2016 Tribeca Film Festival and its international premiere at Sheffield Doc/Fest. It is mostly in Arabic and Korean.

Funds were raised on Kickstarter for the production of the film.

=== Public Screenings ===
In May 2019, Sufra hosted a fundraiser in support of Syrian refugees labelled "From Syria, with Love." The event involved a screening of the film After Spring. All money raised was directly donated to support refugees and asylum seekers.
