= St Raphael's Estate =

Housing estate in Neasden, London

Coordinates: 51.5505°N 0.2649°W

- Interactive map of the St Raphael's Estate area

General information
- Type: Housing estate
- Location: Neasden, Brent, London, England, United Kingdom
- Year built: 1967–1982
- Owner: London Borough of Brent

Technical details
- Floor count: Low-rise

Other information
- Public transit: Stonebridge Park station, Neasden tube station, London Buses (224, 232, 92)

St Raphael's Estate is a housing estate in Neasden and part of the London Borough of Brent in Northwest London, England. A community centre is located within the estate on Rainborough Close. It forms part of the NW10 postcode.

The low-density estate was built between 1967 and 1982, although some of the land dates back further as Brentfield Estate. It has about 1,174 properties of which the vast majority are owned by the local Brent authority. The estate has a relatively high rate of child poverty, and its geographic location makes it somewhat isolated from Wembley or other retail town centres. To its east, St Raphael's Estate is cut by the A406 North Circular Road dual carriageway, while to its west the River Brent and a recreational ground separates it from the Tokyngton locality of Wembley. The superstores of Brent Park are directly to its north.

It is proposed as of 2010 that 21 new homes will be built on the estate.

The majority of the inhabitants are of Afro-Caribbean or Somali heritage.

== Transport ==
Two London bus routes terminate at Pifield Way: the 224 and the 232. The 92 terminates at Drury Way ("St Raphael's North"). Because St Raphael's is very close to Brent Park, there are links to many other bus routes, at IKEA and Tesco, and along the North Circular Road.

Stonebridge Park station and Neasden tube station are the nearest train stations.

== Notable residents ==
- Raheem Sterling – footballer
- George the Poet – musician
- Chunkz – entertainer

== Notable sites and organisations ==
- Sufra NW London – a local charity that is run in the location.
- St. Raphael's Edible Garden – A public growing garden for local residents which is a part of Sufra.

== See also ==
- South Kilburn
- Stonebridge
- Chalkhill Estate
- St. Raphael's Edible Garden
