= MYH =

MYH can refer to:

- An alternative name for MUTYH, a gene that causes colon polyps when mutated.
- Muslim Youth Helpline, a charity helpline that provides support for young people in the UK.
- Myosin heavy chain
