= Al-Mizan Charitable Trust =

Muslim-run charity based in the United Kingdom

- Logo as of 2014
- Founded: October 2011
- Founder: Mohammed S. Mamdani
- Type: Organisation
- Registration no.: 7228603
- Purpose: Poverty in the United Kingdom, Homelessness, Debt
- Location: Acton, London, England, UK
- Region served: United Kingdom
- Key people: Judith Pfeiffer; Roger Chester; Imam Sikander Pathan; Chris Hewer; Ali Orr
- Website: www.almizantrust.org.uk

Al-Mizan Charitable Trust (AMCT), is a Muslim-run charity that supports vulnerable families and individuals living in poverty across the United Kingdom, regardless of their faith or cultural background.

== History ==
Al-Mizan Charitable Trust was founded in October 2011 by Mohammed Sadiq Mamdani, a social entrepreneur, who founded other charities including Muslim Youth Helpline, Ansar Youth Project and most recently Sufra. Al-Mizan Charitable Trust is the UK's first Muslim grant-funder that supports individuals living in poverty, regardless of their faith or cultural background. Every month, the Trust receives more than 40 applications for financial support, of which only half of eligible applications can be supported with a grant or interest-free loan of up to £500. Although the Trust prioritises applications which provide long-term benefit, rising poverty and unemployment have forced the charity to consider funding more and more applications for basic household and subsistence costs.

== Activities ==
The main activity of Al-Mizan Charitable Trust is to distribute grants of up to 500GBP to people in crisis. The grants they distribute to poor families are used to buy items such as mattresses and school uniforms. They also distribute food to poor families struggling to afford the cost of food, distributing approximately 1,000 food packets during the month of Ramadan in 2015.

Al-Mizan Charitable Trust is the parent organization of Sufra, a food bank in London. During its first six months in operation, Sufra handed out food to 20–40 families each week, feeding approximately 3,000 people.

== Aims ==
Al-Mizan Charitable Trust has prioritised five aims of its organisation.

- To promote and campaign for social justice, in all its forms, across the UK;
- To deliver a fair and accountable system of grant-giving, based on individual need and circumstances;
- To respond effectively to changing social, economic and political trends in the UK by directing funds towards the most deprived individuals and, where appropriate, with creativity and innovation;
- To adhere to all recognised good practice models and quality standard measures;
- To develop a culture of sustainable and responsible charitable giving, ensuring the rights of both the donor and the beneficiary.
