= Brent Cross Shopping Centre =

Brent Cross

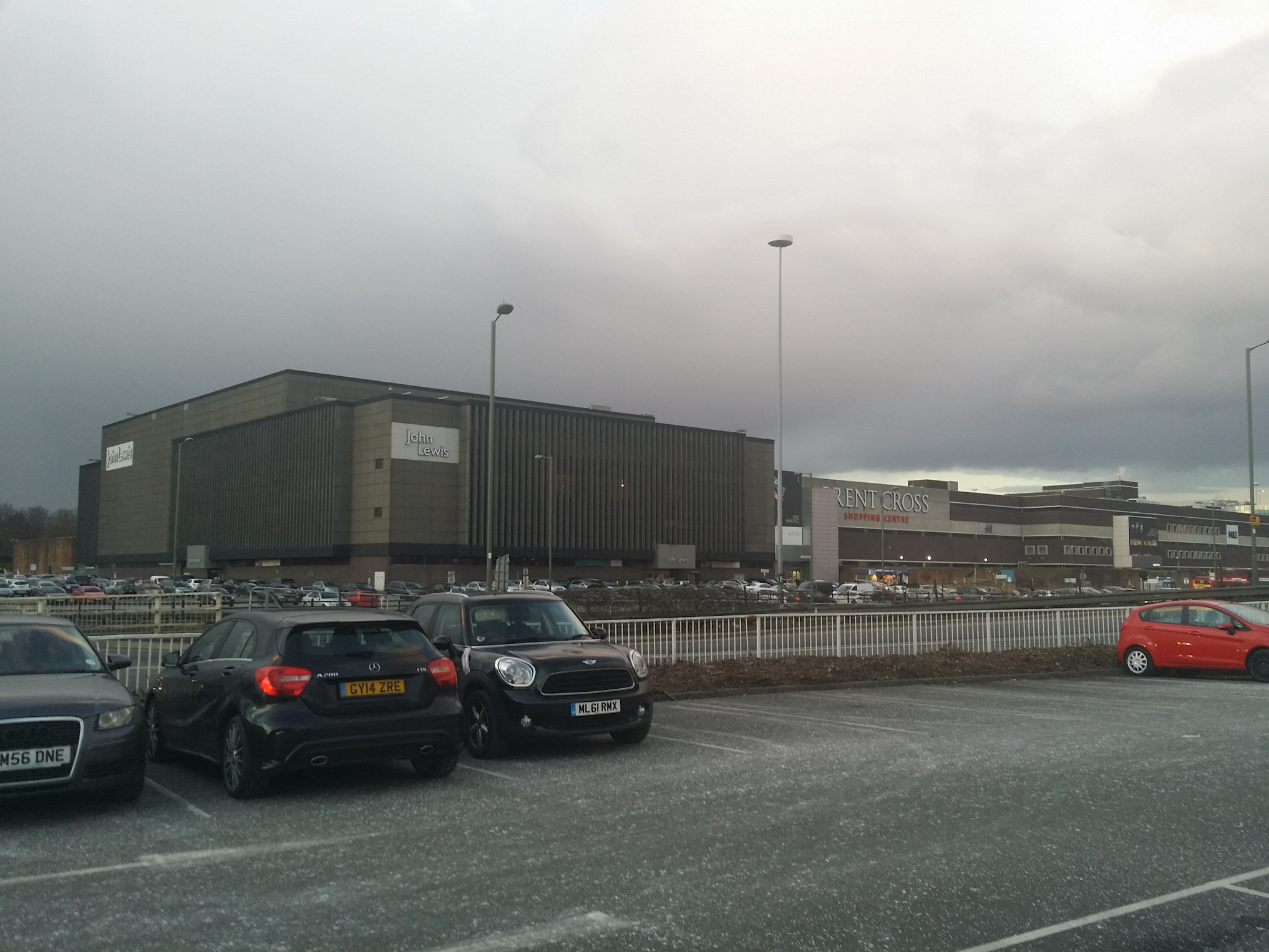
- Centre complex as seen (from the John Lewis end) from the parking area
- Location: Hendon, London, England
- Coordinates: 51.576842°N 0.22372263°W
- Opened: 2 March 1976; 50 years ago
- Owner: Hammerson and Aberdeen Group plc
- Architect: BDP
- Floor area: 910,000 sq ft (85,000 m^{2}) (internal)
- Floors: 2 (3 in Fenwick, John Lewis & M&S)
- Parking: 8000
- Website: brentcross.co.uk

Brent Cross Shopping Centre is a large shopping centre in Hendon, North West London, owned by Hammerson and Aberdeen Group plc. Located by the Brent Cross interchange, it opened in 1976 as the UK's first out-of-town shopping centre. Brent Cross attracted 10.6 million shoppers a year as of 2025 and has one of the largest incomes per unit area of retail space in the country.

== History ==
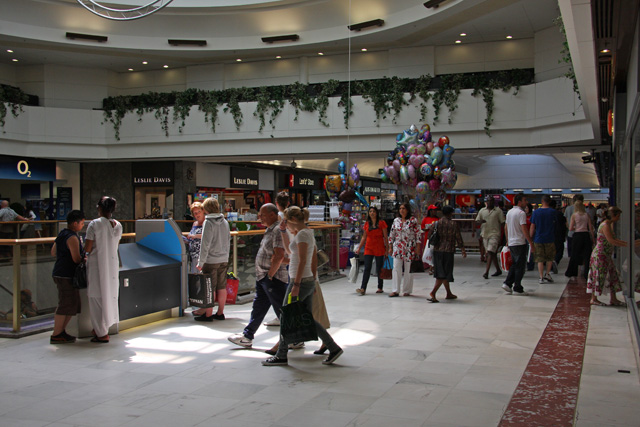
Inside Brent Cross Shopping Centre (July 2008)

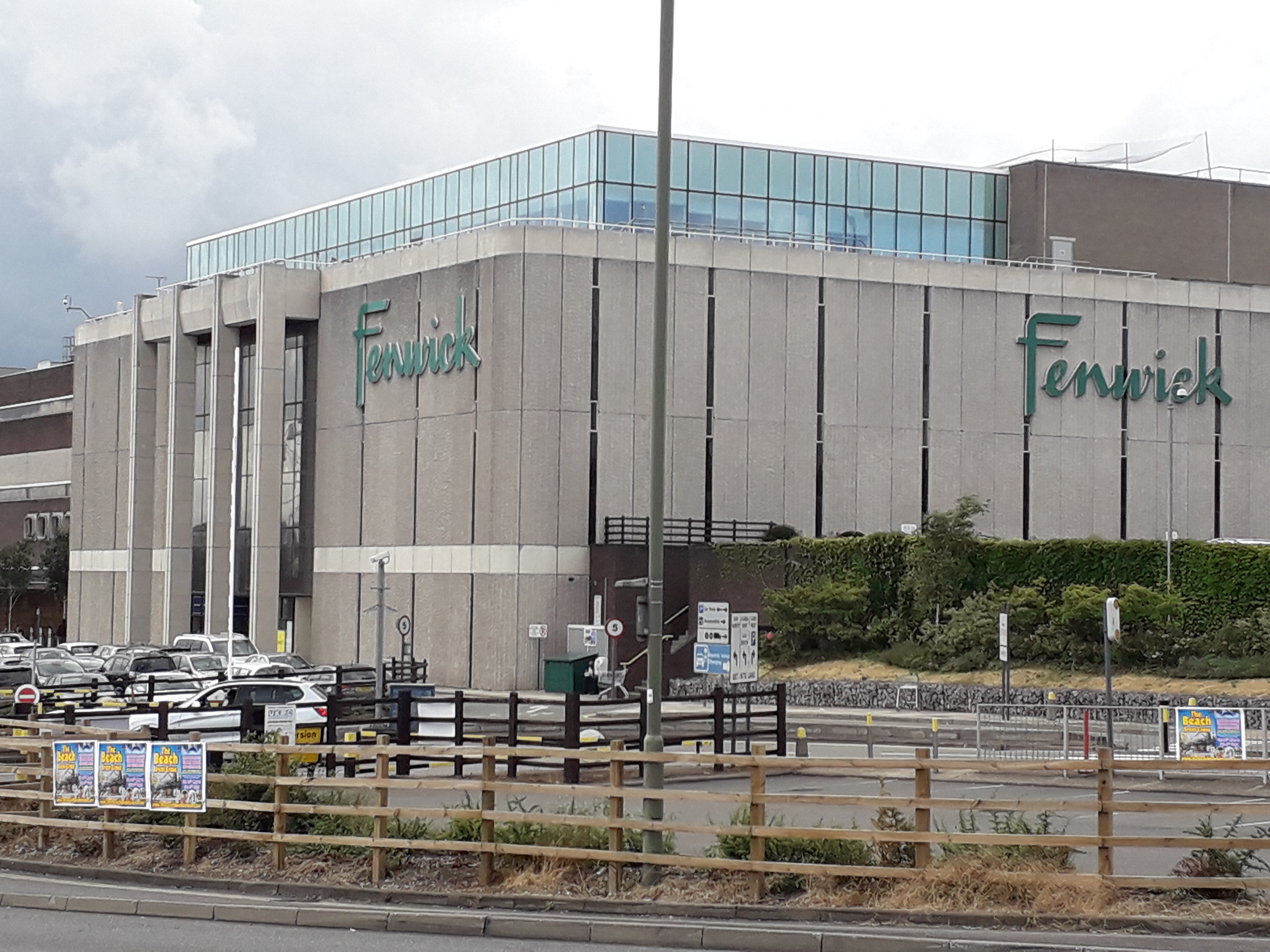
Fenwick's end exterior

Brent Cross Shopping Centre was developed by Hammerson and opened by the then Prince of Wales, now King Charles III, on 2 March 1976. The road adjacent to the shopping centre bears the name Prince Charles Drive to this day.

It was the first out-of-town and American-style indoor shopping centre in the country, with its construction taking 19 years to complete at a cost of £20 million. While the Elephant and Castle Shopping Centre in London predates it, that was not considered to be a fully covered building. The scheme was strongly supported by the local authority of Barnet, but strongly opposed by local traders in Hendon. The centre started out with 800,000 sq ft (74,320 m^{2}) of retail space on a 52-acre (21 ha) site.

=== Opening ===
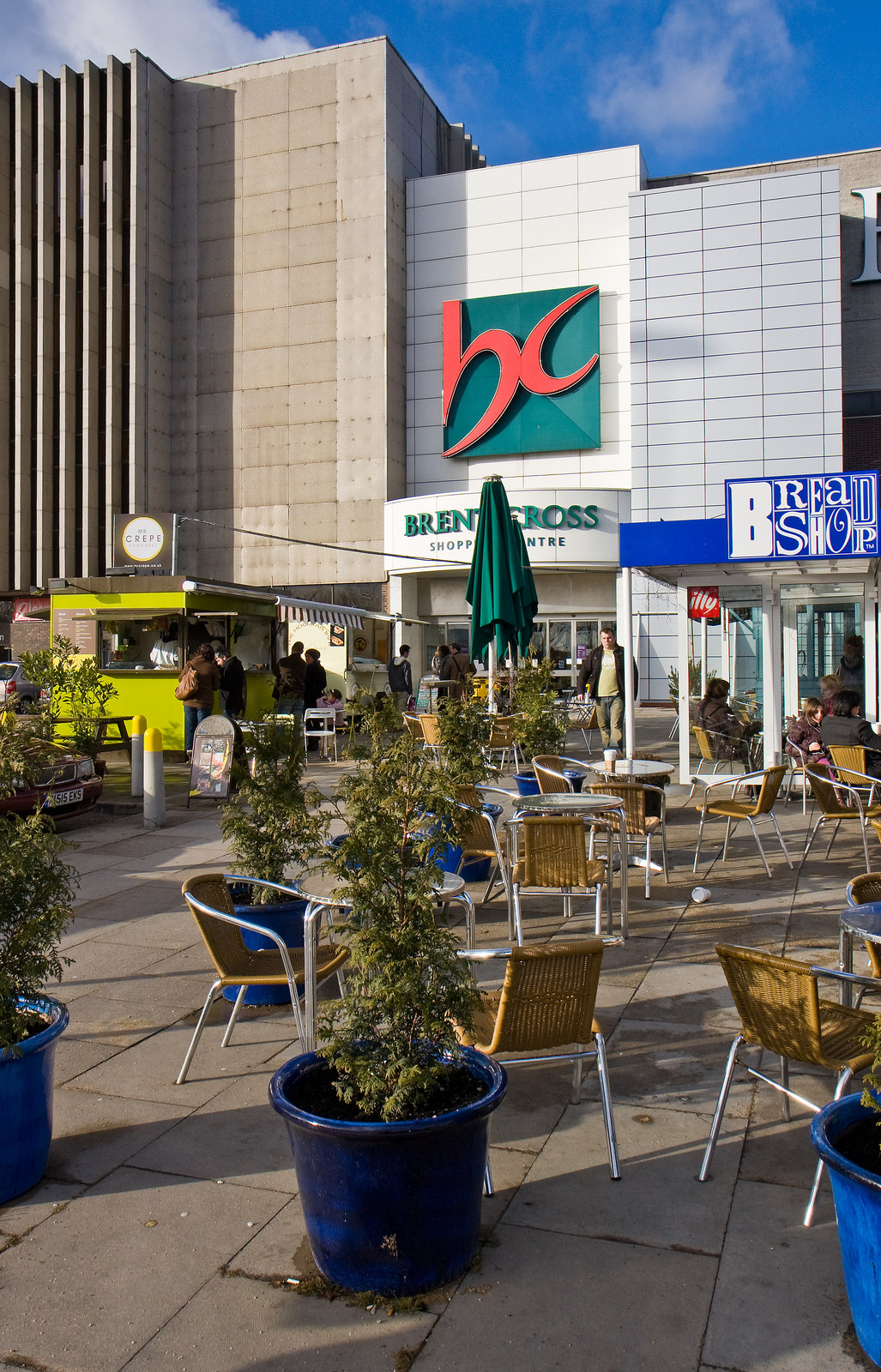
Entrance to the shopping centre at the John Lewis end

Upon its recession-era opening in 1976, Brent Cross was praised by the public bringing a bold American-style concept to Britain. A local newspaper called the centre a "futuristic concept", and its features such as the indoor fountain and air conditioning were noted. Richard Hyman, a retail analyst, said that Brent Cross's significance "can't be overstated. Before Brent Cross there was nothing like it."

Upon opening, Brent Cross had 75 stores and was open until late every weekday despite the mid-1970s UK recession.

Brent Cross was unusual at the time in that it was built on an undeveloped site rather than in a traditional town centre. The centre was built on a "concrete island" surrounded by the Brent Cross flyovers and the busy North Circular Road, but the centre's offering inside is what drew customers to it. The New Society magazine wrote about the centre in 1978:

The massive and featureless rectangles of the Brent Cross Shopping Centre... come as no surprise. They are just as hideous as everything else. But step through the doors and here is prettiness and femininity – just as soulless and just as commercialised as the filth outside, but a veritable perfumed nirvana.

Brent Cross quickly became a popular attraction for people in London and the South East, and a blueprint for shopping centres across Europe. Despite its age and dated appearance, it has remained a popular retail centre ever since. It was ranked as London's 5th largest retail centre in 2005, behind the West End, Croydon, Kingston upon Thames and Bromley. In 2013 it was reported that it received 14 million visitors a year. It was ranked the UK's 9th best shopping centre in 2019 by GlobalData.

The original three department stores when Brent Cross opened – Fenwick, John Lewis and Marks & Spencer – remain at the site. The former two have anchored the shopping centre since the beginning.

By the 1990s, the centre was facing increasing competition from other large out-of-town shopping centres in the region, such as the Lakeside Shopping Centre. Work to extend the centre was begun in 1994 and was completed by 1996, giving it a capacity for 120 stores as well as a new multi-storey car park, replacing the older one, which added 2,000 new spaces. In addition, the low ceiling inside was replaced by glass to let more natural light in.

=== Incidents ===
On 14 December 1991, four explosive devices were planted in the shopping centre by the Provisional Irish Republican Army (IRA). The bombs were discovered and defused before they could be detonated.

On 6 November 2012, six people on three motorbikes entered the shopping centre and smashed the windows at jewellers Fraser Hart. An estimated £2 million worth of jewellery was stolen.

== Expansion plans ==
Brent Cross shopping centre was planned to be extended as a part of the Brent Cross Cricklewood regeneration scheme. The John Lewis and Fenwick Department stores were to remain in their current location, Marks & Spencer was to move to a new location on the extended site, the bus station was to be relocated, and new parks, a "living bridge" across the North Circular Road and a cinema were all planned, along with new multi-storey car parks (with the existing surface carparks to be used for the shopping centre extension). Outline planning permission was achieved in 2010, and preparatory site clearance started in early 2018. Construction had been expected to start in 2018, but the whole scheme was put on hold in July 2018.

== Transport ==
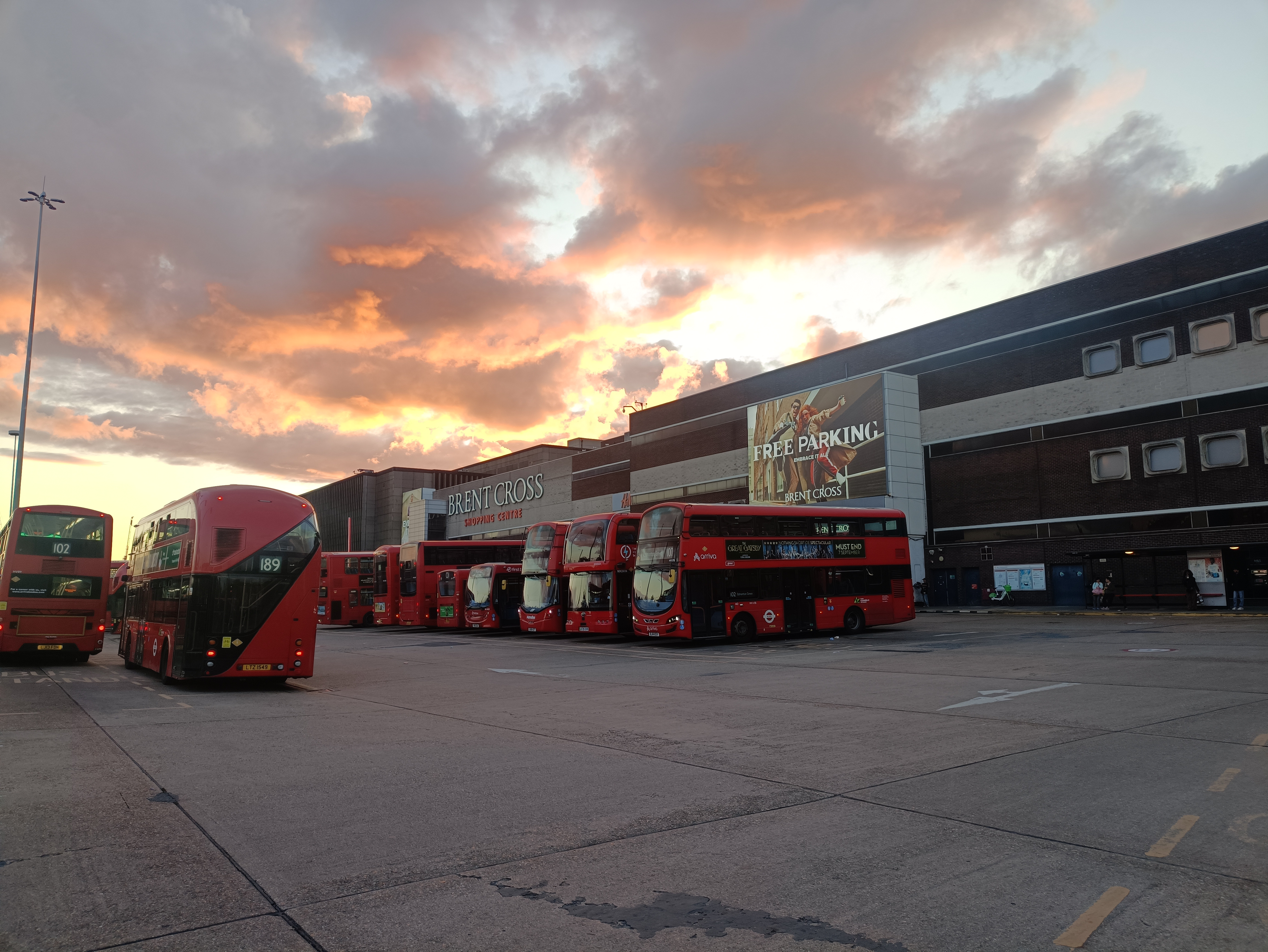
Row of buses at Brent Cross bus station outside the shopping centre

The Brent Cross bus station is adjacent to the shopping centre and is served by 14 different day bus routes with links throughout North London and to West London, the West End, and Hertfordshire.

The bus station is served by 4 bus stops. Bus stop A acts as a terminating point for routes 102, 142, 143, 182, 186, 189, 210, 266, 326 and C11, as well as school route 643 and night route N266. Bus stop B is served by routes 112, 142, 182, 232, 266 and night route N266. Bus stop C is served by routes 102, 112, 143, 186, 189, 210, 232, 324, 326, C11 and 643. Bus stop L is served by routes 112 and 324.

In September 2025, TfL proposed a new London Superloop express bus route running from Hendon War Memorial to Ealing Broadway, serving Brent Cross Bus Station. Following public consultation in September and October, an evaluation and review were conducted. As of January 2026, no decision on the route's future has been publicly announced.

The shopping centre is surrounded by a "spaghetti junction" of trunk roads typical from the time it was built. As a result, pedestrian access to and from the shopping centre complex has been deemed "hostile" in modern times. The Brent Cross Cricklewood regeneration scheme aims to improve the local environment, and a new Brent Cross West Thameslink station opened in December 2023. The area is also home to Brent Cross station, which serves the Edgware branch of the Northern line on the London Underground.

== In popular culture ==
The interior of the shopping centre was featured in the 1994 film London by Patrick Keiller. It shows the former large fountain and stained glass on the roof, which were removed in 1996. It was also used to film the music video for "The Love Within", by the indie rock band Bloc Party, in 2015.

The car park of the shopping centre was used as a filming location for the 1997 James Bond film Tomorrow Never Dies.

The shopping centre was also featured in Ken MacLeod's science-fiction novel The Star Fraction. The action takes place in a balkanized UK, in the middle of the 21st century, and the ruins of the shopping centre are used as a local market for the anarchist enclave of Norlonto ('North London Town').

== See also ==
- Bentall Centre
- Bluewater
- Centrale
- Eden Walk
- The Glades
- Lakeside Shopping Centre
- Westfield London
- Westfield Stratford City
- Whitgift Centre
