= London Buses route 189 =

London bus route

189
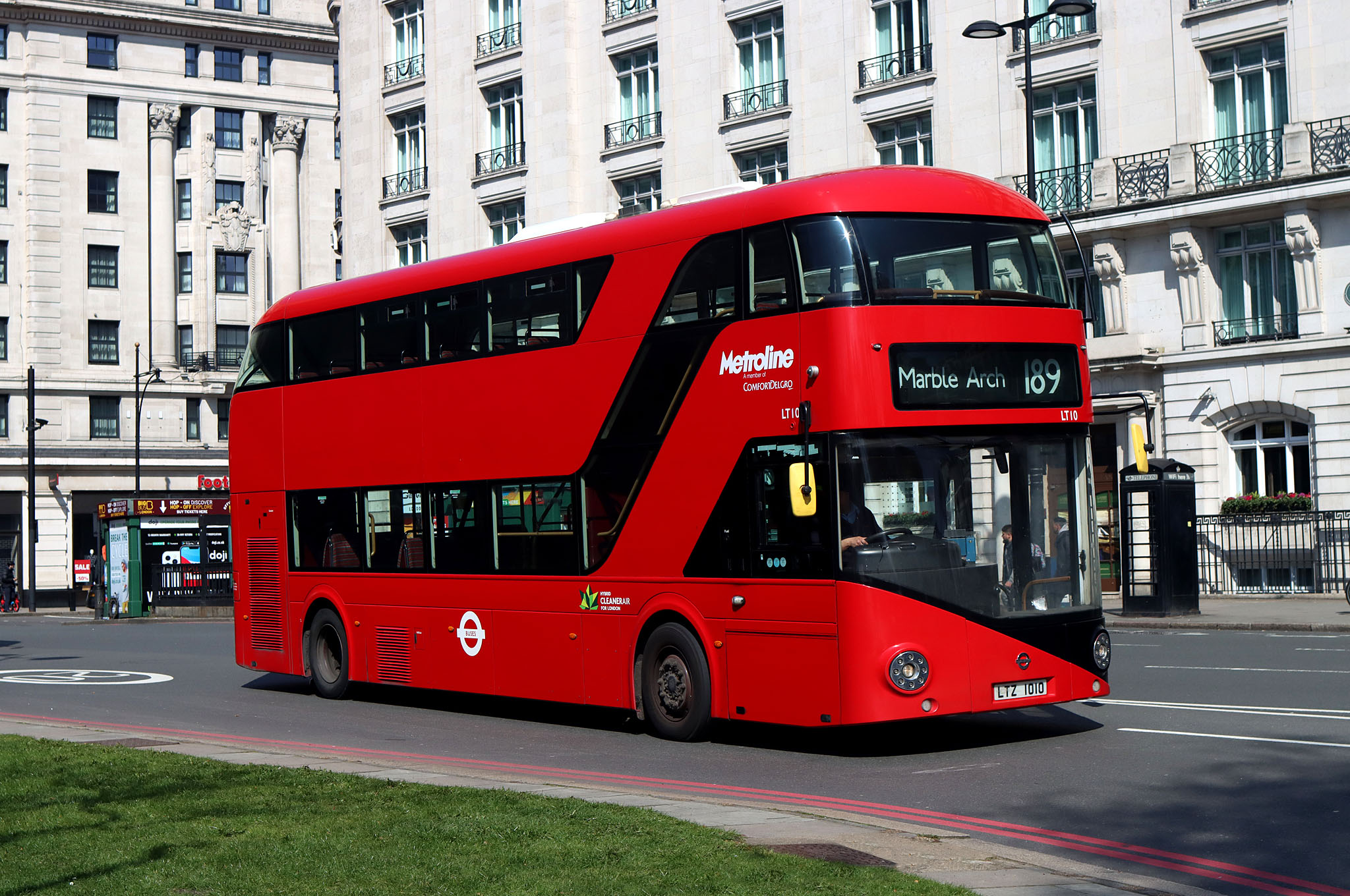
- Metroline New Routemaster at Marble Arch in April 2023

Overview
- Operator: Metroline
- Garage: Cricklewood
- Vehicle: New Routemaster
- Night-time: 24-hour service

Route
- Start: Brent Cross bus station
- Via: Cricklewood; Kilburn; Abbey Road; Baker Street; Selfridges
- End: Marble Arch station

Service
- Level: 24-hour service
- Frequency: About every 8-12 minutes
- Journey time: 34-61 minutes
- Operates: 24-hour service

London Buses route 189 is a Transport for London contracted bus route in London, England. Running between Brent Cross bus station and Marble Arch station, it is operated by Metroline.

== History ==
Route 189 commenced operation on 11 October 1997 running between Kilburn Park Station and Brent Cross Shopping Centre. The route was introduced to partially replace the withdrawn route 16A (which ran from Brent Cross to Oxford Circus). On 28 March 1998, the route was extended to Oxford Circus, still starting at Brent Cross.

The route was converted from the original Alexander Dennis Enviro400s to the New Routemaster, the route was one of the last to make the switch.

On 1 April 2017, the route was withdrawn between Orchard Street/Portman Street and Oxford Circus, and diverted to Marble Arch. The route was proposed to be withdrawn between Marble Arch and Belsize Road, furthermore, the route would have been extended to Camden Town replacing route 31. The night service would have been renumbered to N189 and would continue to run to Marble Arch. The suggested change was subject to lots of controversy as it would have deprived certain areas of direct bus access to Central London. On 23 November 2022, TfL decided to suspend the plans until further notice, keeping the initial Brent Cross-Marble Arch service.

== Current route ==
Route 189 operates via these primary locations:

- Brent Cross bus station
- Brent Cross West station
- Cricklewood
- Kilburn station
- Brondesbury station
- Belsize Road
- Marlborough Place
- Abbey Road
- St John's Wood
- Baker Street station
- Portman Square
- Marble Arch station
