= Neasden Hospital =

Coordinates: 51.550°N 0.260°W

Neasden Hospital was built in 1894 by Willesden District Council as an isolation hospital in Neasden.

During the First World War its name was changed to Willesden Municipal Hospital. When it joined the National Health Service in 1948 it had 200 beds. A newly refurbished theatre block was opened in 1949 with 16 beds for tonsillectomy patients.

In 1985 it was the site of a workers occupation aiming to keep the hospital open. It closed in 1986.
