= Sufra (charity) =

Organization based in the United Kingdom

Coordinates: 51.549061°N 0.266105°W

Sufra NW London
- Founded: April 2013
- Founder: Mohammed S. Mamdani
- Type: Charity
- Registration no.: 115191
- Purpose: Food poverty in the United Kingdom
- Location(s): St Raphael's Estate; Stonebridge, London, England, UK
- Region served: United Kingdom
- Key people: Rajesh Makwana
- Website: www.sufra-nwlondon.org.uk

Sufra (legally known as Sufra NW London) is a community food and support hub based in Stonebridge ward in the London Borough of Brent.

Sufra was founded by Mohammed Mamdani; its name comes from an Arabic term, sufra, associated with communal eating. It was officially founded in April 2013 when the London Borough of Brent's council funded the charity in Raphael's Estate, one of the poorest estates in that area.

== History ==
=== 2011-2019: Foundations and growth ===
In 2011, Sufra was proposed by Mohammed Mamdani, a social entrepreneur, who founded the Muslim Youth Helpline and Ansar Youth Project and Al-Mizan Charitable Trust. In April 2013, Sufra relocated to St Raphael's Estate.

In June 2014, Sufra began to run Food Academies, teaching people to cook. In January 2015, Sufra joined a partnership with Aston Business School.

Sufra collected food as to prepare for the Universal Credit. On 15 January 2019, Mamdani resigned from Sufra as the director and was replaced by Rajesh Makwana, BEM

In November 2019, Sufra held a "Food-Parcel Challenge" which aimed to shine a light on the current food poverty crisis in Brent where people would have lived on a food parcel for five days whilst raising funds for the charity.

In 2019, Sufra joined the Feeding Britain network, the Independent Food Aid Network and the Brent Food Aid Network (eventually becoming chair of the latter) – campaigning for Brent to become a Brent Right to Food borough. Sufra joined Brent Council's response to food shortages.

=== 2020–2022: COVID-19 and OpenARMs programme ===
Sufra was featured in Hello! magazine's list of charities you can support during coronavirus and how to help in 2020. The charity was holding a coronavirus emergency appeal during this time of the year. Sufra struggled with food chain crisis during the pandemic. Rajesh Makwana, the director of Sufra, received a British Empire Medal in 2022 for his services to Brent, particularly during the pandemic.

In January 2022, Sufra NW London partnered with Islamic Relief.

== See also ==
- List of food banks
- Mohammed Mamdani
