= Brent Park, Neasden =

Retail park in the London Borough of Brent, England

Coordinates: 51.554°N 0.258°W

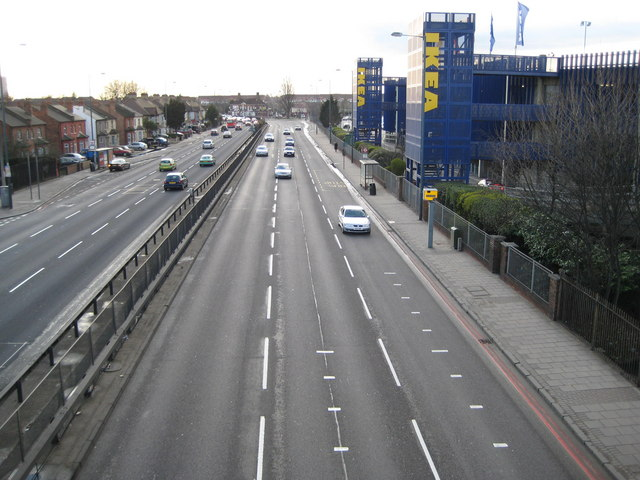
View of the North Circular Road with the park's IKEA store on the right

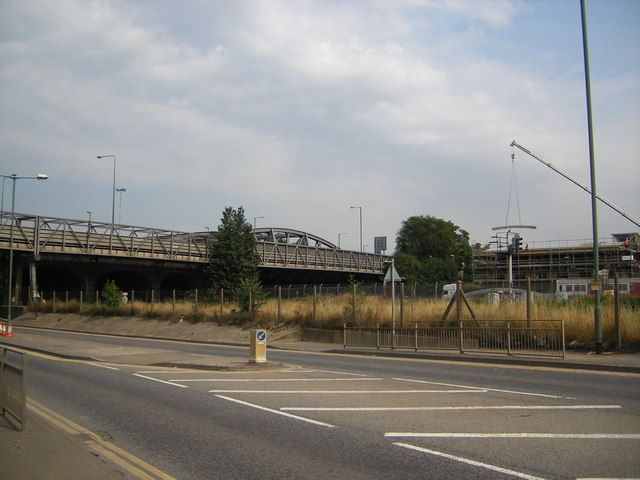
Great Central Way, the bridge being North Circular Road and the railway line

Brent Park is a retail area of Neasden in the London Borough of Brent, located by the A406 North Circular Road and to the south of Neasden Depot. It includes an IKEA store, along with a Tesco Extra superstore, and bounded by a McDonald's restaurant on the south-west.

== Transport ==
Bus routes 16, 92, 112, 224 and 232 serve the area.
