= Muslim Youth Helpline =

Helpline for Muslim youth in the UK

- Founded: August 2001
- Founder: Mohammed Mamdani; Mustafa Suleyman
- Type: Helpline
- Registration no.: 1108354
- Purpose: Social issues within the Muslim Youth
- Location: London
- Region served: United Kingdom
- Website: www.myh.org.uk

Muslim Youth Helpline (MYH) is a national helpline, registered as a charity, providing free and confidential faith and culturally sensitive support services targeted at vulnerable young people in the United Kingdom. Although its target audiences are young Muslims, it does not propagate any religious or political beliefs, seeking only to provide relief to and improve the social condition of vulnerable young people.

== History ==
=== 2001–2003: Foundation ===
MYH was founded in August 2001 by Mohammed Sadiq Mamdani and Mustafa Suleyman, who were both 18 at the time, in response to the social problems endured by Muslim youth in the UK. It was at college that Mamdani first realised the extent of isolation that today's young Muslims experience; while problems such as drug misuse, depression and sexuality are issues common among many young people, he believed that young Muslims often need advice that takes into account broader religious and social contexts.

=== 2004–2006: Recognition, expansion, campaigns ===
By 2004, MYH had expanded nationwide and was the only telephone helpline of its kind in the UK. It started running a befriending scheme through which volunteers meet up with young Muslims on a social basis or provide practical help such as accompanying them to jobcentres, or helping fill in application forms whenever guidance is needed.

In 2004, MYH released a Prison Campaign on muslimyouth.net and was called "Behind Bars". After the huge success of the initial campaign it was adopted by MYH as an annual campaign. In 2005 they launched its "Doing a Runner" campaign to raise awareness within the community of the many young Muslims who run away from home, and may at various times in their life find themselves vulnerable, alone and homeless. The campaign concluded with "2 Dayz of Street Life", an event involving members of the public who stayed in shelters and on the streets for two days to experience what a homeless person may go through. In February 2006, MYH was awarded with the CSV Award for the "Most Heart Warming Project" of its kind.

=== 2013–2016: Growth ===
An annual dinner takes place every year in May with notable guests. In May 2014, special guests included Jemima Khan, Asad Ahmed, Mishal Husain amongst others. In 2015, MYH reported that an increasing number of young Muslims are seeking advice because they are concerned about Islamophobia in the United Kingdom. In 2016, MYH released an article via Refinery29 on how to tackle Ramadan With A Mental Health Condition. Akeela Ahmed, who was the director of MYH at the time highlighted that most of the people she worked with, who are dealing with mental health issues, feel guilty if they do not fast.

=== 2017–2021: Working with EastEnders and coronavirus ===
In 2019, BBC One soap opera, EastEnders worked with the Muslim Youth Helpline on a storyline about a teen exploring his newfound faith as he finds peace after prison. Speaking about the storyline, Executive Producer Jon Sen highlighted his thrill to be working with MYH to challenge preconceptions and prejudices about the role of faith in young people's lives. As a result, EastEnders was commended for being one of the first British soaps to show Islam in a positive light.

In 2020, it was reported that during the COVID-19 pandemic in the United Kingdom, MYH received an increase in calls, where MYH volunteer Zohra Kakhu stated that the helpline has had calls from young Muslims with mental health conditions, for whom Friday prayers were their only lifeline to the outside world, providing them with a vital support system and connection to their community.

In April 2021, British Muslim teenager, Zaheid Ali, 13, died after jumping off Tower Bridge into the River Thames which received national news coverage. As a result, MYH urged young people experiencing thoughts of suicide to contact them for non-judgemental, confidential support.

=== 2022–present: Barriers to additional funding ===
In 2022, it was reported that Faith charities were facing additional barriers to grant funding. MYH which relies on grant funding described being hesitant to apply for larger grants after being rejected previously without explanation and for fear of being stereotyped.

== Awards and accreditation ==
MYH has won the following awards:

- 2003: AOL Innovation in the Community Award
- 2003: National Council for Voluntary Youth Services Young Partners Award
- 2003: Phillip Lawrence Award
- 2003: Muslim News Community Development Award
- 2003: BT Telephone Helplines Association Helpline Volunteer of the Year Award
- 2004: Muslim News Award for Excellence in Community Development
- 2004: Whitbread Young Achievers Award (awarded to Mohammed Sadiq Mamdani)
- 2004: Purple Youth Award for "Best Youth Site" awarded to muslimyouth.net
- 2005: Investors in People Accreditation
- 2005: Community Care Award
- 2005: CSV "Most Heart Warming Campaign" awarded to Prison Campaign
- 2007: Malcolm X Young Persons Award for Excellence (awarded to muslimyouth.net)
