= Neasden =

Coordinates: 51.5552°N 0.2465°W

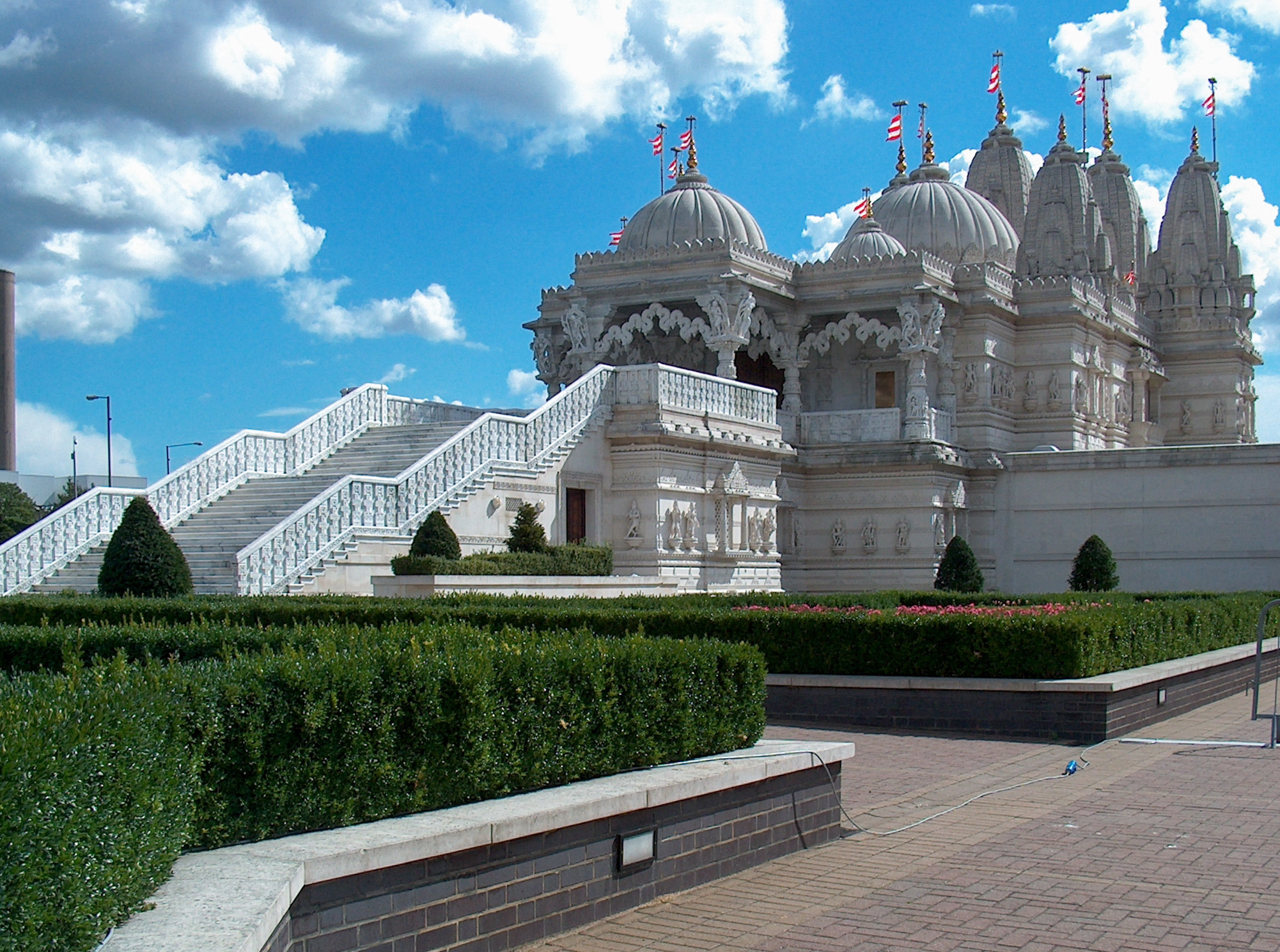
- BAPS Shri Swaminarayan Mandir is Europe's first traditional Hindu stone temple.

- Location within Greater London
- OS grid reference: TQ215855
- London borough: Brent
- Ceremonial county: Greater London
- Region: London
- Country: England
- Sovereign state: United Kingdom
- Post town: LONDON
- Postcode district: NW2, NW10
- Dialling code: 020
- Police: Metropolitan
- Fire: London
- Ambulance: London
- UK Parliament: Brent East
- London Assembly: Brent and Harrow

Neasden (/ˈniːzdən/) is a suburban area in northwest London, England. It is located around the centre of the London Borough of Brent and is within the NW2 (Cricklewood) and NW10 (Willesden) postal districts. Neasden is near Wembley Stadium, the Welsh Harp, and Gladstone Park; the reservoir and River Brent marks its boundaries with Kingsbury and Wembley, while Gladstone Park and the Dudding Hill line separates it from Dollis Hill and Church End respectively. The A406 North Circular Road runs through the middle of Neasden; to the west is the Neasden Underground Depot, Brent Park retail area and the St Raphael's Estate; on the east is Neasden tube station, the large Neasden Temple, and former Neasden Power Station. The area is known as the place where Bob Marley lived after moving from Jamaica, living at a house in The Circle; the house was honoured with a blue plaque in 2012.

== History ==
=== Toponymy ===
The area was recorded as Neasdun in AD 939 and the name is derived from the Old English nēos = 'nose' and dūn = 'hill'. It means 'the nose-shaped hill', referring to a well-defined landmark of this area. In 1750, it was known as Needsden and the present spelling appeared at a later date.

=== As a hamlet ===
Neasden was a countryside hamlet on the western end of the Dollis Hill ridge. The land was owned by St Paul's Cathedral, who appointed priests to St Mary's Church in Neasden. In medieval times, the village consisted only of several small buildings around the green near the site of the present Neasden roundabout.

In the 15th–17th centuries the Roberts family were the major landowners in the area. Thomas Roberts erected Neasden House (on the site of the modern Clifford Court) in the reign of Henry VIII. In 1651 Sir William Roberts bought confiscated church lands. After the Restoration the estates were returned to the ownership of the Church but were leased out to the Roberts family. Sir William improved Neasden House, and by 1664 it was one of the largest houses in the Willesden parish.

During the 18th century the Nicoll family replaced the Roberts as the dominant family in Neasden. In the 19th century these farmers and moneyers at the Royal Mint wholly owned Neasden House and much of the land in the area.

Neasden was no more than a "retired hamlet" when enclosure was completed in 1823. At this time there were six cottages, four larger houses or farms, a public house and a smithy, grouped around the green. The dwellings include The Grove, which had been bought by a London solicitor named James Hall, and its former outbuilding, which Hall had converted into a house that became known as The Grange.

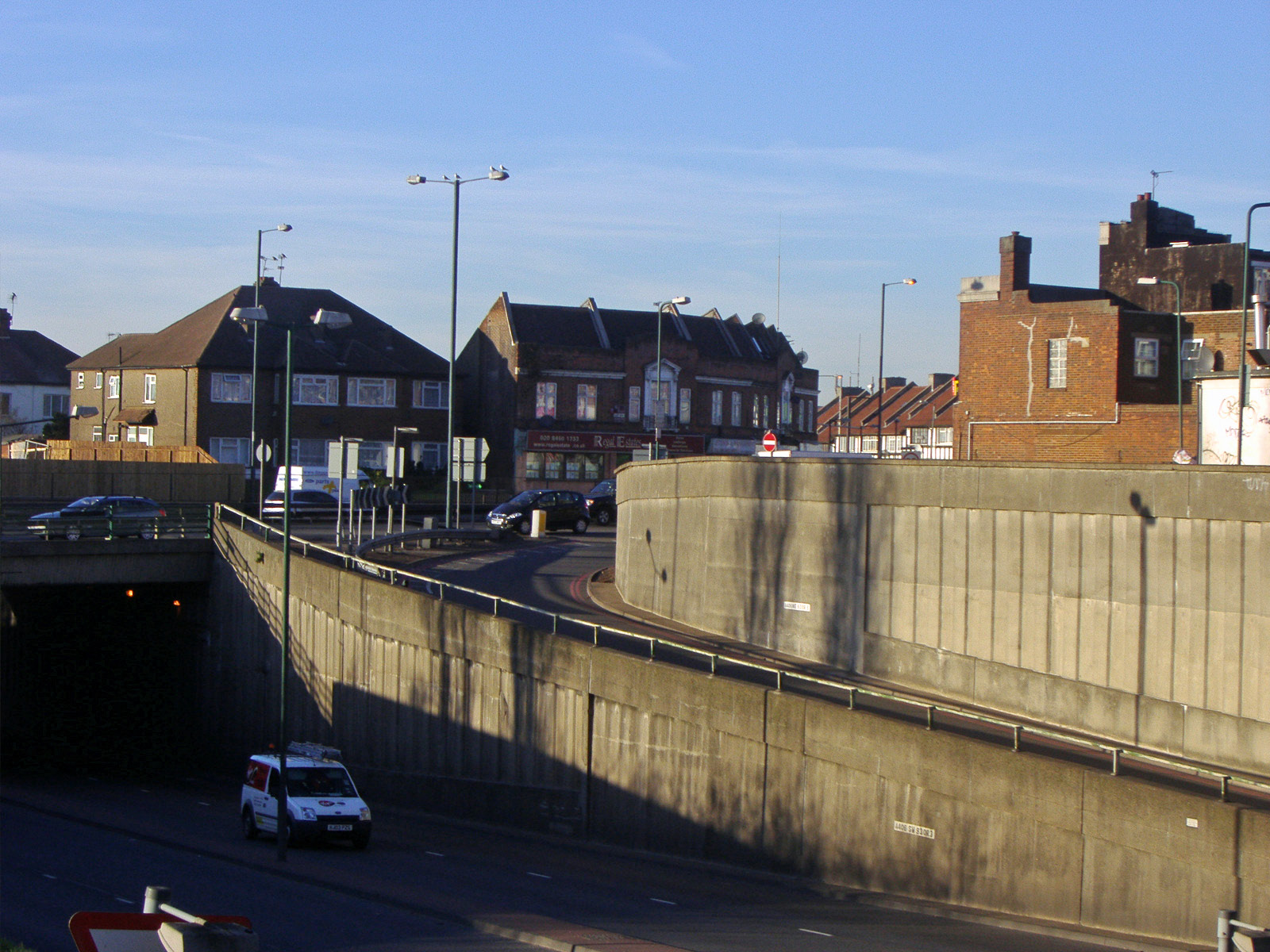
Neasden underpass

The Welsh Harp reservoir was completed in 1835 but breached in 1841 with fatalities. It had a dramatic effect on the landscape as the damming of the River Brent put many fields and meadows under water.

In the early 1850s, Neasden had a population of about 110. As London grew in the second half of the 19th century, the demand for horses for transport in London soared. Neasden farms concentrated on rearing and providing horses for the city. Town work was exhausting and unhealthy for the horses, and in 1886 the RSPCA formed a committee to set up the Home of Rest for Horses with grounds in Sudbury and Neasden, where for a small fee town horses were allowed to graze in the open for a few weeks.

=== Urbanisation ===
The urbanisation of Neasden began with the arrival of the railway. The first railway running through Neasden (Hendon–Acton and Bedford–St. Pancras) was opened for goods traffic in October 1868, with passenger services following soon. In 1875, Dudding Hill, the first station in the area, was opened, and the Metropolitan Railway was extended through Neasden shortly afterwards. Neasden station was opened on Neasden Lane in 1880. New housing, initially for railway workers, was built in the village (particularly around Village Way) with all the streets named after Metropolitan Railway stations in Buckinghamshire. These survive today, and are called Quainton Street and Verney Street, followed by Aylesbury Street in the 1900s.

In 1883, an Anglican mission chapel, St Saviour's, was set up in the village. Its priest, the Reverend James Mills, became an important and popular figure in late 19th century Neasden. In 1885 Mills took over St Andrew's, Kingsbury and became vicar of a new parish, Neasden-cum-Kingsbury, created because of the area's rising population.

Before Mills' arrival, the only sporting facilities in Neasden had been two packs of foxhounds, both of which had disbanded by 1857. Mills became founder president of Neasden Cricket Club and encouraged musical societies. In 1893 a golf club was founded at Neasden House; however only 10% of its members came from Neasden.

In the 1890s change led to a conscious effort to create a village atmosphere. At this time, the Spotted Dog became a social centre for local people. By 1891 Neasden had a population of 930, half of whom lived in the village. Despite the presence of the village in the west, it was the London end that grew fastest.

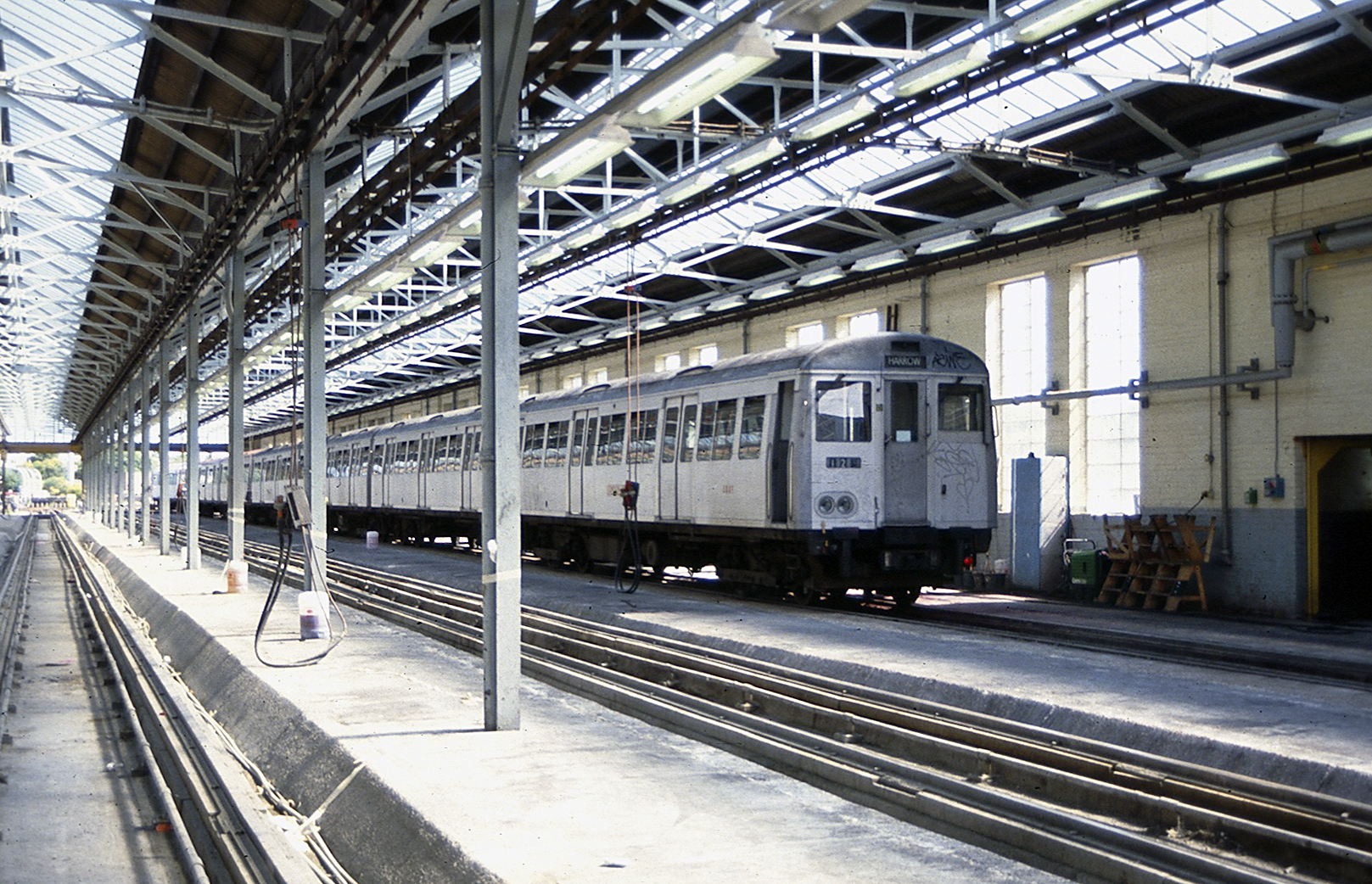
Neasden Depot, the largest London Underground train depot

In 1893 the Great Central Railway obtained permission to join up its main line from Nottingham with the Metropolitan. Trains ran on or alongside the Metropolitan track to a terminus at Marylebone (this is now the modern day Chiltern Main Line). The Great Central set up a depot south of the line at Neasden and built houses for its workers (Gresham and Woodheyes Roads). The Great Central village was a "singularly isolated and self-contained community" with its own school and single shop, Branch No. 1 of the North West London Co-operative Society. It is now part of a conservation area. There was considerable sporting rivalry between the two railway estates, and a football match was played every Good Friday. By the 1930s the two railways employed over 1000 men.

Neasden Hospital was built in 1894 and closed in 1986.

=== Early 20th century ===
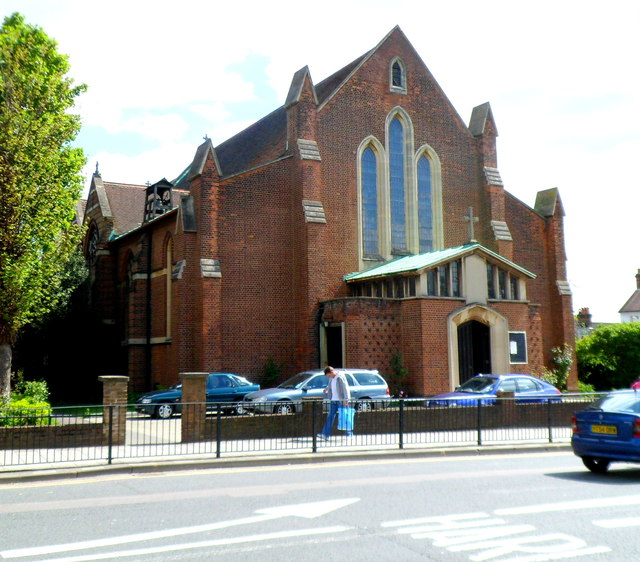
St Catherine Church of England on the corner of Dudden Hill Lane and Dollis Hill Lane, built 1916

Apart from the railways, Neasden was dominated by agriculture until just before the First World War. In 1911, Neasden's population had swelled to 2,074. By 1913, light industry at Church End had spread up Neasden Lane as far as the station.

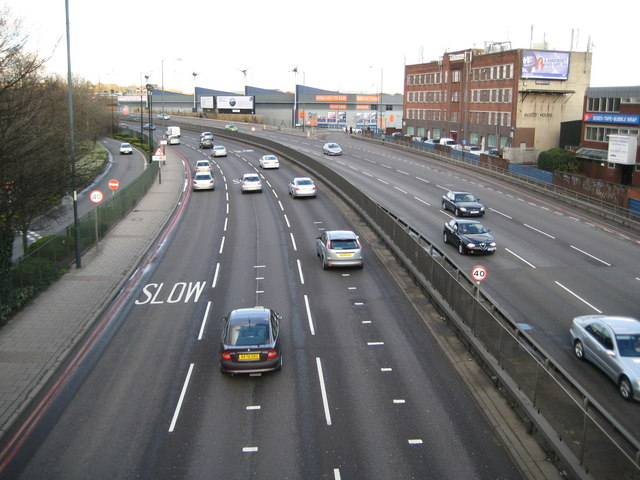
The North Circular Road, pictured from near the Welsh Harp

In the 1920s, the building of the North Circular Road, a main arterial route round London, brought another wave of development; it opened in 1922–23. The 1924–25 British Empire Exhibition led to road improvements and the introduction of new bus services. Together with the North Circular Road, it paved the way for a new residential suburb at Neasden. In 1930 Neasden House was part demolished. The last farm in Neasden (covering The Rise, Elm Way and Vicarage Way) was built over in 1935. The Ritz cinema opened in 1935 and Neasden Shopping Parade was opened in 1936, and was considered the most up-to-date in the area. All of Neasden's older houses were demolished during this period, except for The Grange, and the Spotted Dog was rebuilt in mock-Tudor style. Industries sprung up in the south of the area, and by 1949, Neasden's population was over 13,000.

=== WW2 and post-war period ===
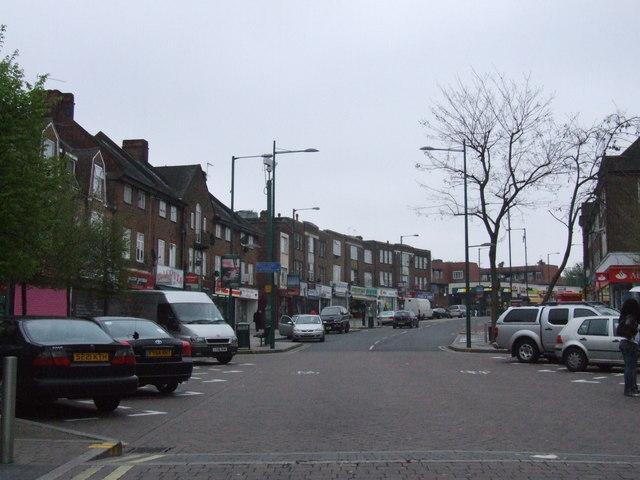
Shops on Neasden Lane, collectively called "Neasden Shopping Centre"

The Post Office Research Station was located nearby in Dollis Hill. There the Colossus computers, among the world's first, were built in 1943-1944 and underneath it the Paddock wartime cabinet rooms were constructed in 1939.

In 1945, Willesden Borough council acquired land by the North Circular Road to build temporary prefab homes. There were two sites: one called Ascot Park built beside the gas factory, and another either side of The Pantiles public house (which is now converted into a McDonald's restaurant). Most of the prefab homes were demolished by the end of the 1950s.

The post-war history of Neasden is one of steady decline; local traffic congestion problems necessitated the building of an underpass on the North Circular Road that effectively cut Neasden in half and had a disastrous effect on the shopping centre by making pedestrian access to it difficult. The decline in industry through the 1970s also contributed to the area's decline. But nonetheless Neasden has survived, largely due to a succession of vibrant immigrant communities keeping the local economy afloat. Neasden Depot continues to be the main storage and maintenance depot for the London Underground's Metropolitan line (and is also used by trains of the Jubilee line); it is London Underground's largest depot and as such it is a major local employer.

Neasden Power Station, which was built to provide power for the Metropolitan Railway, was closed and demolished in 1968.

After the war, a new housing estate called St Raphael's Estate was built west of the North Circular Road and to the east of the River Brent and Wembley.

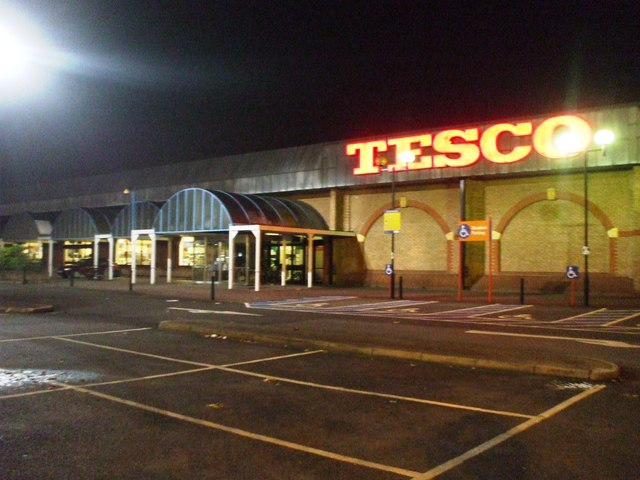
Wembley Tesco Extra in Neasden (with old signage)

In 1978, Tesco purchased a 43 acres (17 ha) site in Neasden's Brent Park retail area by the North Circular Road. The borough council objected against the building of a superstore due to threats against local merchants. The superstore was eventually opened in 1985, and Tesco called it London's largest food store. It continues to operate today as Tesco Extra Wembley.

In 1988, IKEA opened its second UK store at the Brent Park retail area, at the site of the old Ascot Gas Water Heater factory.

=== Contemporary history ===
The Grange Tavern (previously called The Old Spotted Dog) on Neasden Lane was closed in the 1990s and demolished to make way for a block of flats, bringing to an end the inn that had stood there for around two centuries. Another old pub, The Pantiles which stood on the North Circular Road was converted to another McDonald's restaurant. The Swedish furniture retailer, IKEA opened its second UK outlet in Neasden in 1988.

On 14 July 1993 in an MI5 anti-terrorist operation, a Provisional IRA man was arrested in his car on Crest Road carrying a 20 lb bomb. It came just over a year after the Staples Corner bombing just over 500 yards away, which devastated the junction.

In 1995, Neasden became the home of the biggest Hindu temple outside India: the Neasden Temple.

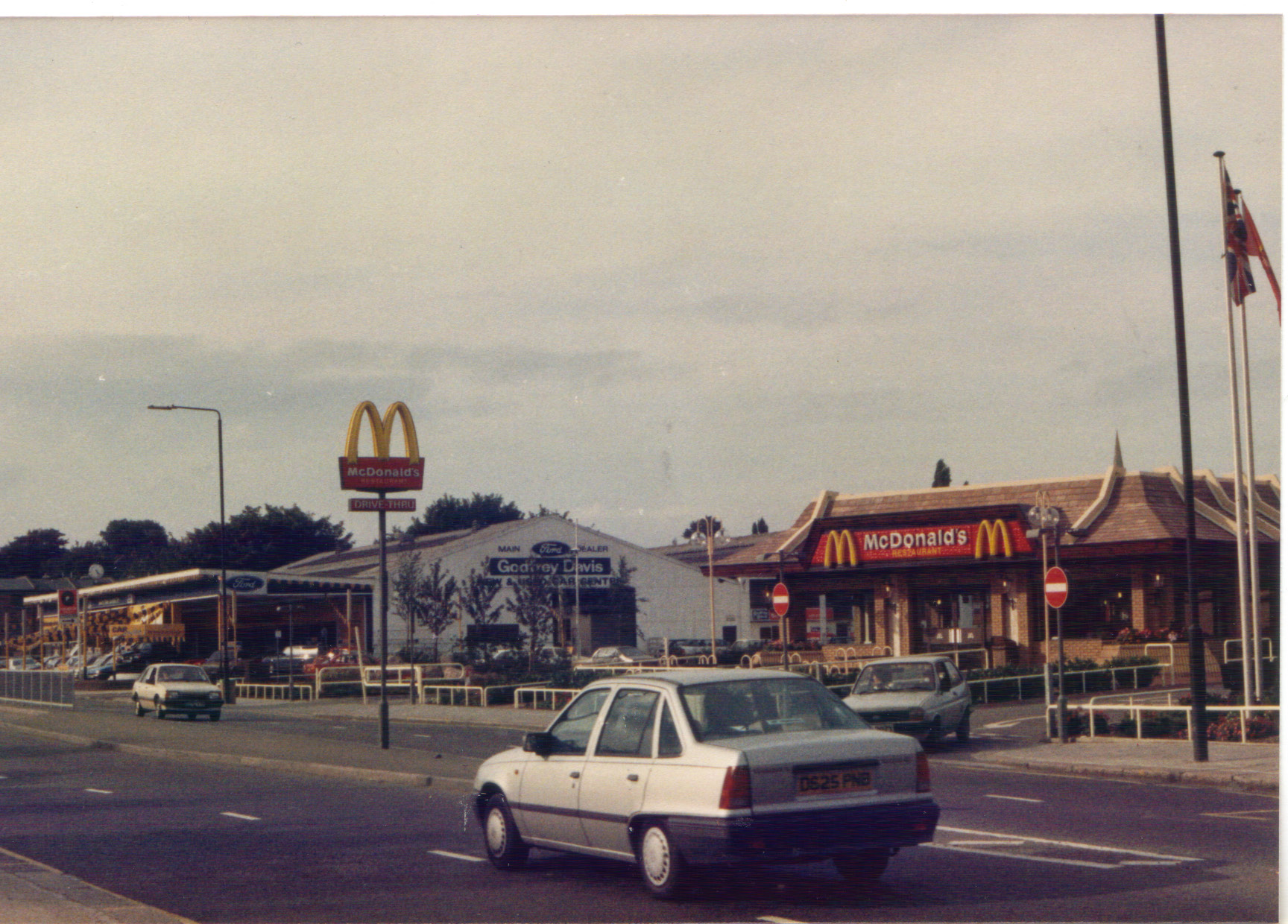
Neasden Lane North, circa 1987

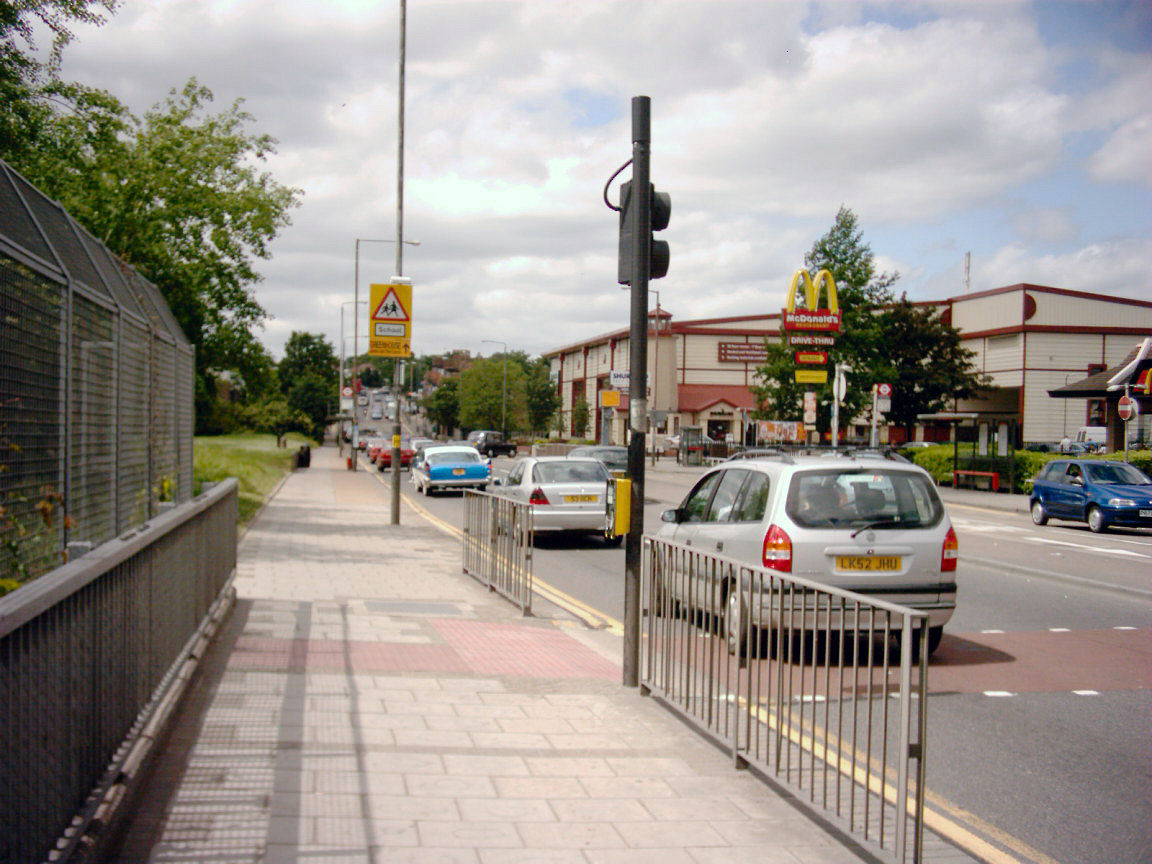
Around the same spot on Neasden Lane North, 2005

The area around Neasden Lane North was for a while terrorised by a local gang called "Press Road Crew" who carried knives, dealt drugs and performed vandalism. In 2003, seven members were caught and were banned from the streets they were active in, including Chalkhill Estate in Wembley Park, in the then biggest (by area size) anti-social behaviour order in Britain.

In 2004, the Shopping Centre area was partially redeveloped by the council in an effort to reverse its fortunes. The Grange, which had housed a community museum about the people of Brent was closed by the council in 2005. The building is now a restaurant with its namesake, located inside the Neasden roundabout. The 2004 redevelopment proved to be unpopular with local businesses as it changed the layouts of parking, thus forcing customers and local trade to pass by due to the parking restrictions of the redevelopment.

In 2018 the writer Nicholas Lezard called Neasden a "prime example of what happens when a big road [North Circular] both carves up and strangles an area."

== Politics ==
Neasden is within the UK parliament constituency of Brent East, currently represented by Dawn Butler MP (Lab). The part of Neasden north of the railway tracks is in the Welsh Harp ward, while the part to the south is in the Stonebridge ward.

== Neasden in popular culture ==
"The loneliest village in London"

Neasden was once nicknamed ‘the loneliest village in London’.

Private Eye

Neasden has achieved considerable notoriety due to the British satirical magazine, Private Eye. Since early in its history (when the magazine was actually printed in Neasden) the magazine has used Neasden as an exemplar of the suburban environment in pieces parodying current events, personalities, and social mores (for example, the University of Neasden). Spoof sports reports in the magazine usually feature the perennially unsuccessful football team, Neasden F.C. with their manager, "ashen-faced" Ron Knee and their only two supporters, Sid and Doris Bonkers.

Metro-land

Neasden was one of the locations in the TV documentary Metro-land. In it, Sir John Betjeman described Neasden as "home of the gnome and the average citizen" (the former a reference to the preponderance of gnome statuettes in suburban front-gardens, but possibly also a nod in the direction of the Eye's fictional proprietor, Lord Gnome). Background music was provided by William Rushton's recording of Neasden (1972) ("Neasden/You won't be sorry that you breezed in").

BBC Radiophonic Workshop

In a spoof of the Early Music phenomenon which grew in the late 1960s, Neasden was selected by BBC Radiophonic Workshop composer David Cain, as the home of a fictional ensemble dedicated to historically-informed performances on authentic musical instruments from an indeterminate number of centuries ago. It was thus that in 1968, listeners to BBC Radio 3 were given a recital by the Schola Polyphonica Neasdeniensis, whose members performed on the equally fictional Shagbut, Minikin and Flemish Clackett.

Athletico Neasden

Athletico Neasden was an amateur football team of mostly Jewish players, which played in the Maccabi (Southern) Football League in the 1970s and 1980s and was named after the place, though it did not actually play in the area. The team eventually merged with North West Warriors to form North West Neasden.

Literature

David Sutherland's children's novel A Black Hole in Neasden reveals a gateway to another planet in a Neasden back garden. Diana Evans's 2006 novel, 26a, details the experiences of twin girls of Nigerian and British descent growing up in Neasden.

Victorian Order medals

Willie Hamilton reported in 'My Queen and I' that the Victorian order medals were made on a production line in Neasden from used railway lines.

Dread Broadcasting Corporation

A pirate radio station, Dread Broadcasting Corporation, credited as Britain's first black music radio station, was broadcast from a Neasden garden between 1981 and 1984.

== Transport and locale ==
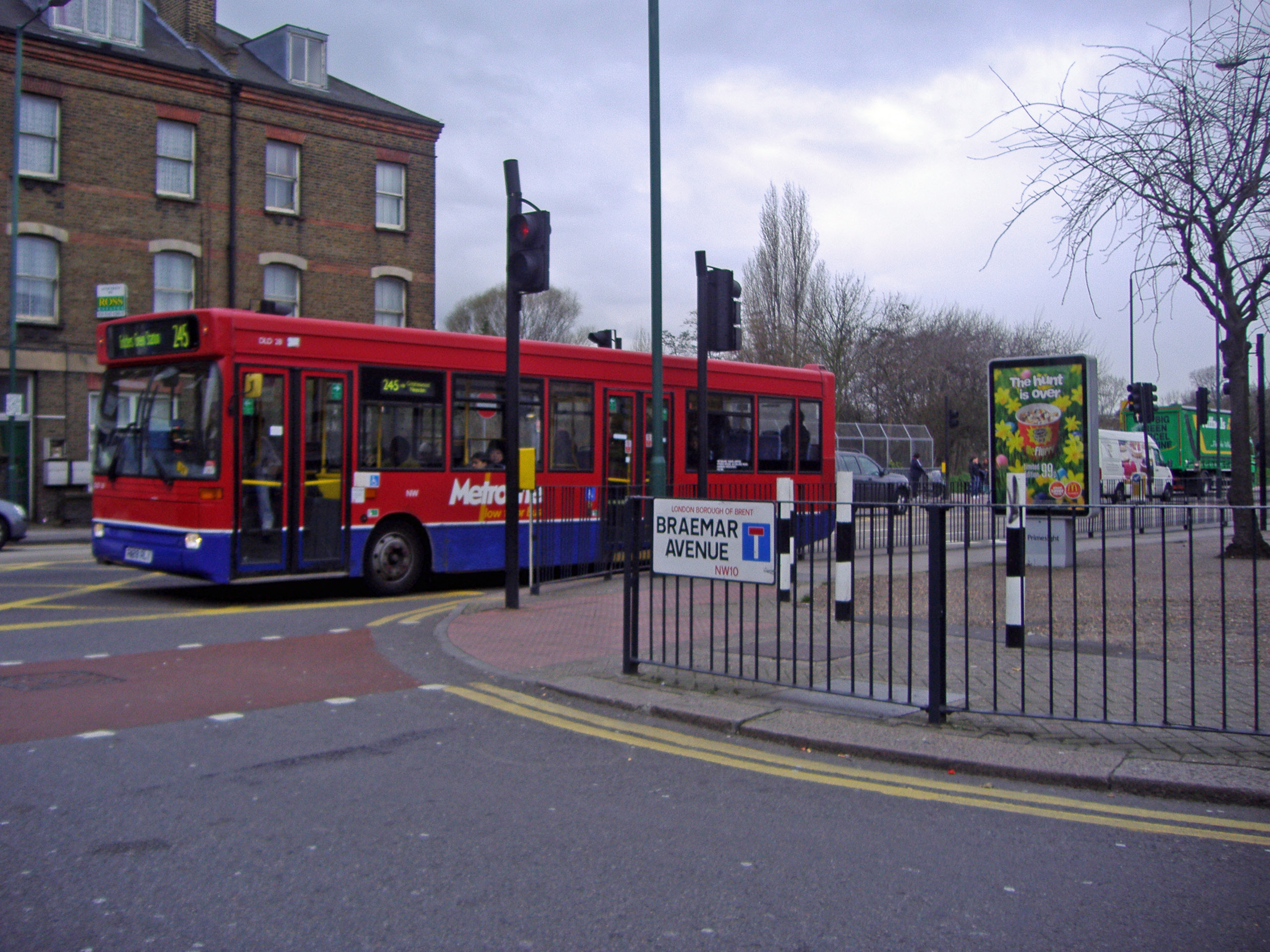
Metroline bus route 245 on Neasden Lane North, 2008

=== Local attractions ===
- BAPS Shri Swaminarayan Mandir London, South Neasden
- Brent Reservoir
- Neasden Bunker, North Neasden, Brook Road NW2 – alternative Cabinet War Rooms.
- St. Raphael's Edible Garden

=== Nearest places ===
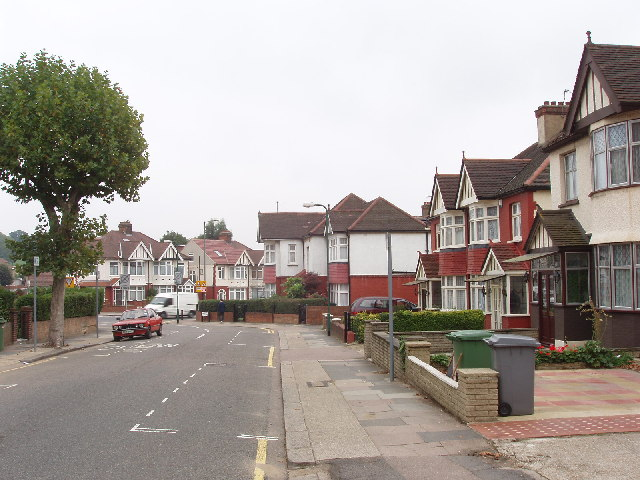
Prout Grove off Dudden Hill Lane

=== Tube ===
Neasden station is on the Jubilee line and is the only train station in a fairly wide geographic area, excluding Dollis Hill station which is close but on the same line. The southern end of St Raphael's Estate is close to Stonebridge Park station, while the northern end of Neasden (near Staples Corner) is pretty close to Hendon station. In 2023, Brent Cross West station was opened which replaced Hendon as the nearest Thameslink station for Neasden.

== Notable Neasdonians ==
- Twiggy (model and actress)
- Gerry Anderson (producer, director and writer)
- Ginger Baker (musician)
- Bert Elkin (professional footballer)
- Diana Evans (Novelist)
- Mario Fabrizi (film, TV and radio personality)
- Vinny Feeney (boxer)
- Judy Grinham (Olympic swimmer)
- Charlie Kunz (musician)
- Arthur Ted Powell (artist)
- George the Poet (spoken-word artist)
- William Roberts (Member of Parliament)
- Jock Rutherford (footballer)
- Raheem Sterling (footballer)
- Gary Warren (actor)
- Graham Young ("The Teacup Poisoner")
- Mari Wilson (singer)
- Angelos Epithemiou (fictional character)
- Bob Marley (reggae singer)
- Chunkz (social media personality and singer)
