= Sufra =

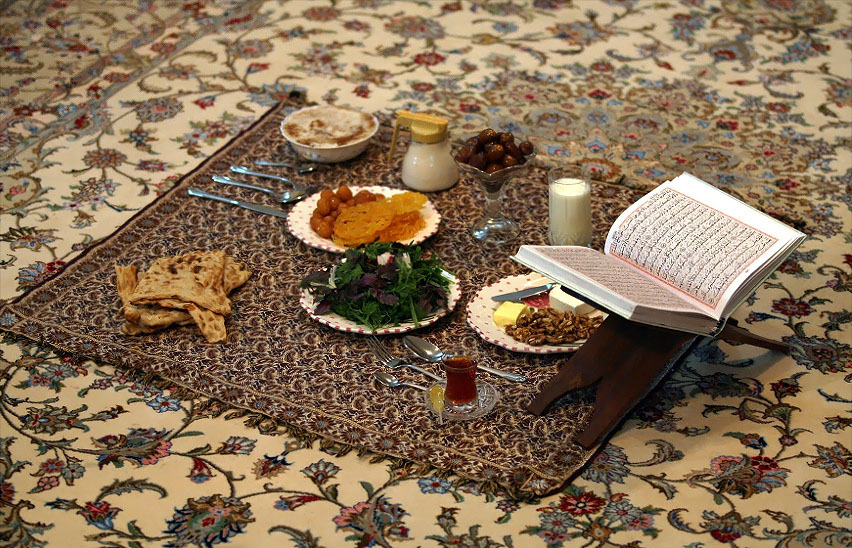
Iranian iftar meal upon a sufra

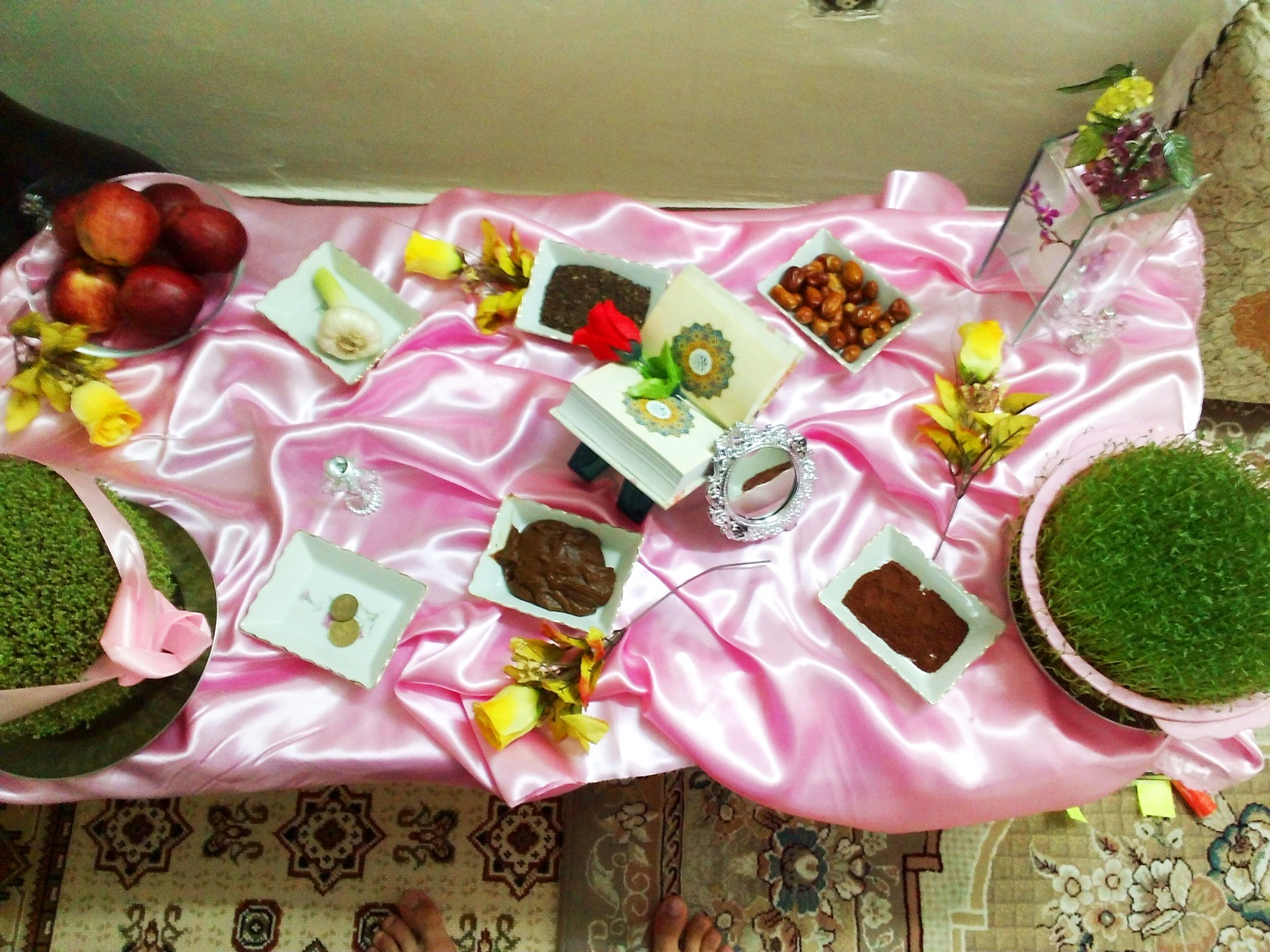
Iranian sufra, laid for the celebration of Navroz

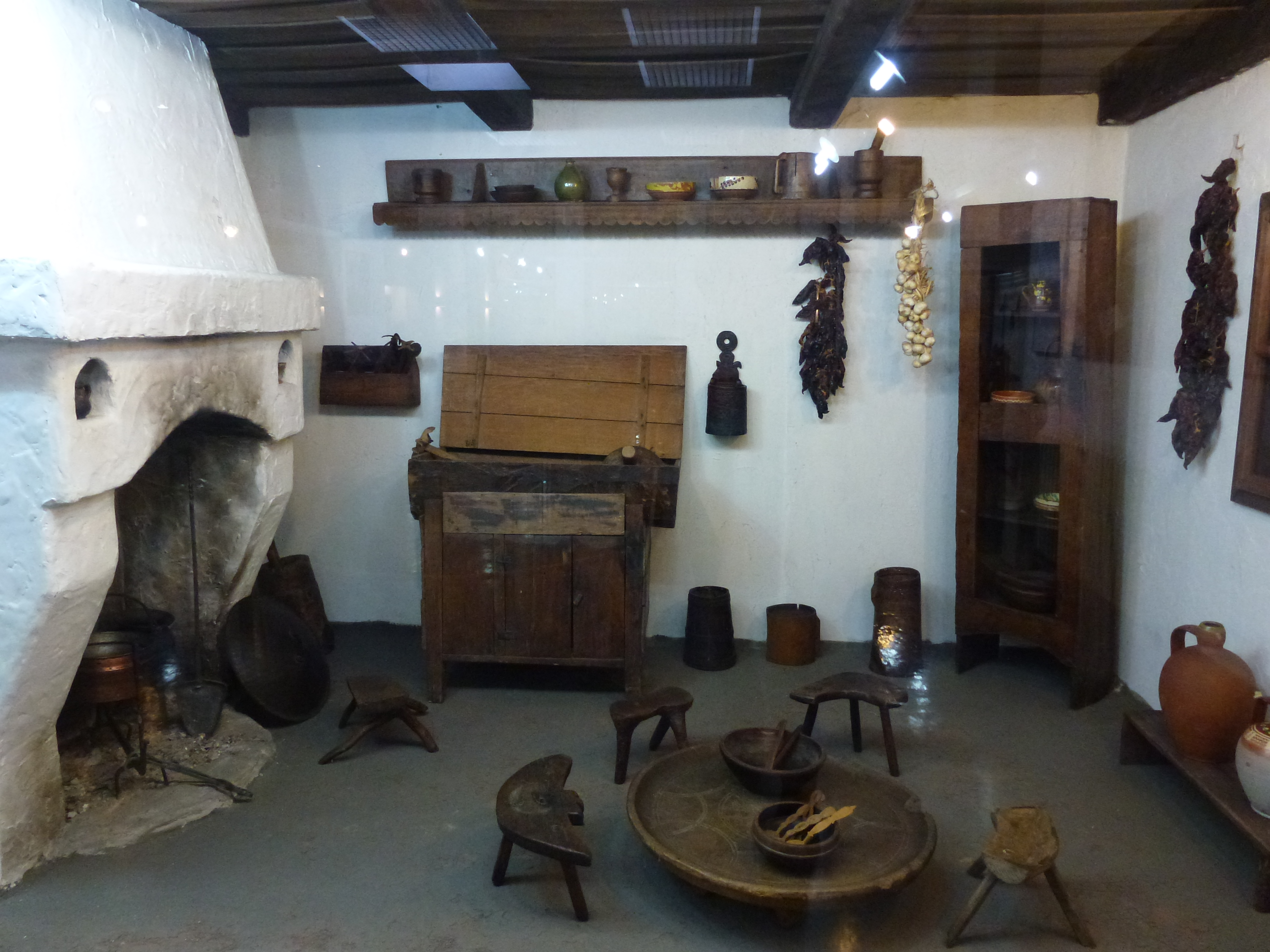
Traditional wooden sufra (bottom right) in situ in the Belgrade Ethnographic Museum

A sufra, sofra, or sofreh (Arabic: سُفْرَة; Persian: سفره; Turkish: sofra; Georgian: სუფრა; Armenian: սուփրա) is a cloth or table for the serving of food, or, in an extended sense, a kind of meal, associated with Islamicate culture.

== Forms of the sufra ==
The word comes from the Semitic root s-f-r, associated with sweeping motions and with journeys (also giving rise to the word borrowed into English as safari). According to E. W. Lane's Arabic-English Lexicon, the basic meaning of the word was 'the food of the traveller', 'food that is prepared for the traveller ... or for a journey'.

However, the term also referred to a kind of bag in which a traveller would carry food: this traditionally comprised a circular piece of skin or cloth, with a drawstring running round the circumference. Food could be placed in the middle and the drawstring pulled to create a bag in which to carry the food. When it was time to eat, the bag could be placed on the ground and the drawstring released, creating a surface from which to eat the food.

By extension, the word also came to mean a platter (of wood or metal) from which food could be served, or even simply a dining table.

Islamic tradition has it that the Prophet customarily ate from a sufra, with his right hand, while seated on the floor, and eating in this way has at times been seen as a good practice for Muslims. Traditional family dining in Iran and Afghanistan involves a sufra (known in Afghanistan as a disterkhan) in the form of a mat placed on the floor or a carpet. By extension, the term can refer to a meal with religious significance at which women gather and pray in both Iran and Afghanistan. Sufra can refer to a ritual meal among Shiite Muslims and Zoroastrians in Iran too. In Kazakhstan the sufra takes the form of a tablecloth on a low, round table, and is known as a dastarkhan, and Pakistan dastarkhawn. The sofra is also an important ritual meal to members of the sufi Bektashi order. In Ṣafawid Persia, around the seventeenth century CE, one of the official roles in the royal kitchen was the sufrači-bāshī, in charge of arranging the cloth sufra on the floor.

The sufra has given its name to a Muslim-run community food scheme in the London borough of Brent, founded in 2013.
