= 3 ft 6 in gauge railways in the United Kingdom =

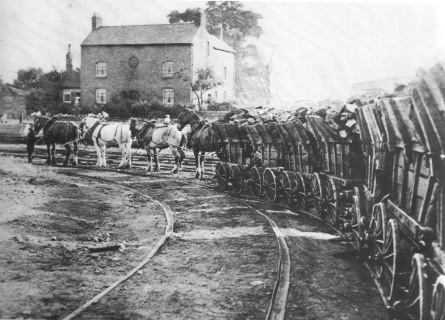
The Little Eaton Gangway in 1908 with the last train of loaded coal wagons.

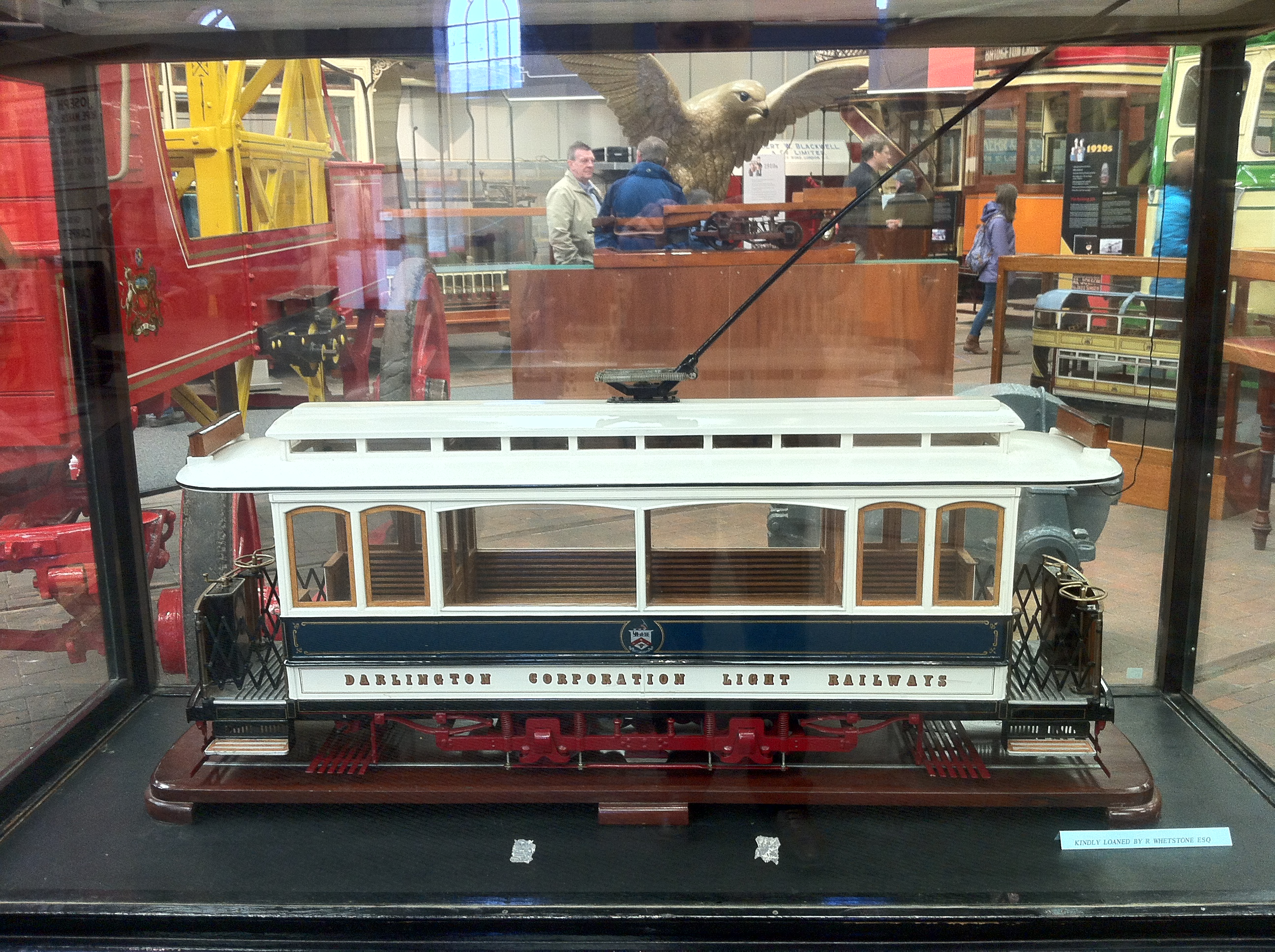
Model of a Darlington Corporation Light Railways tramcar at the National Tramway Museum.

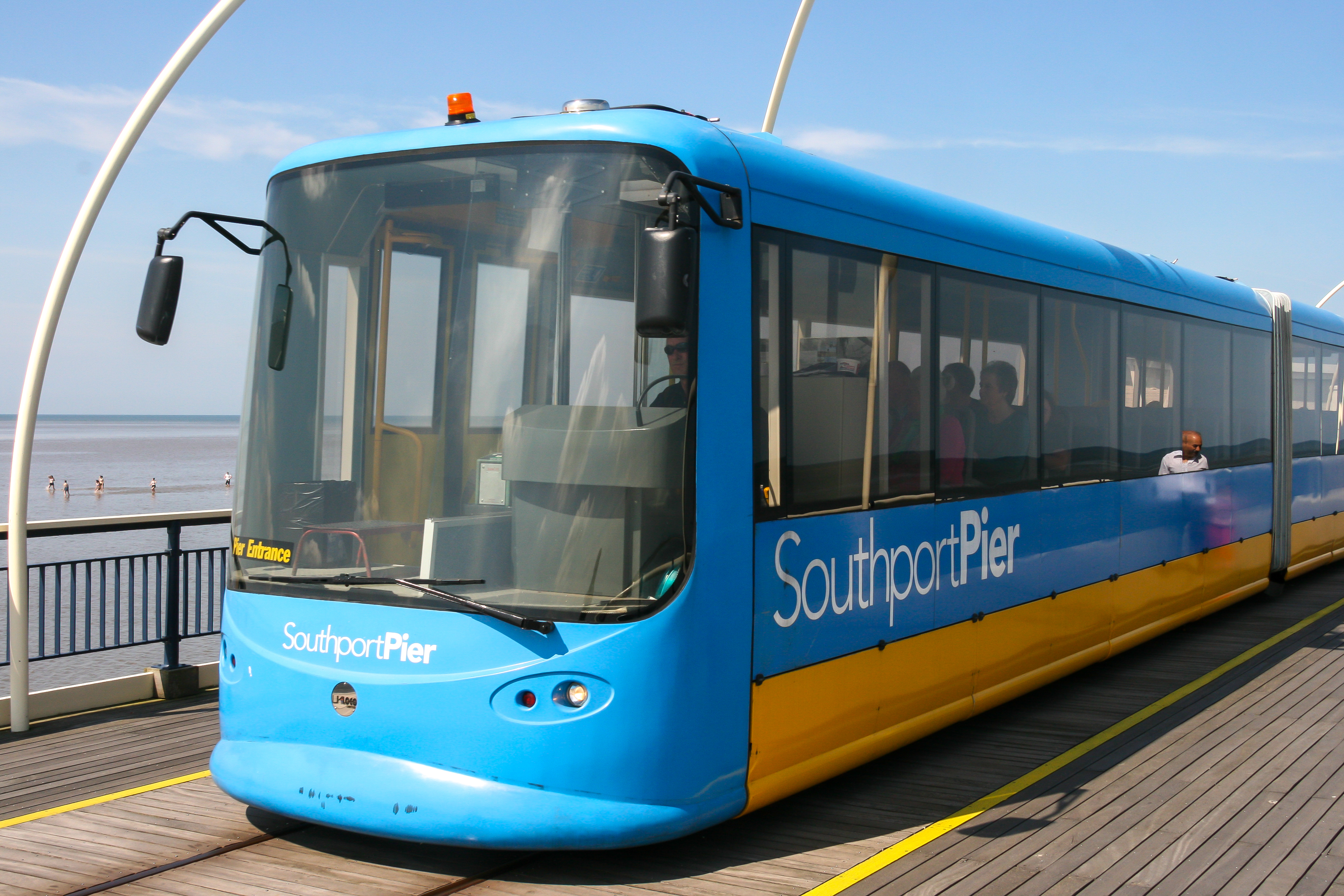
The Southport Pier Tramway.

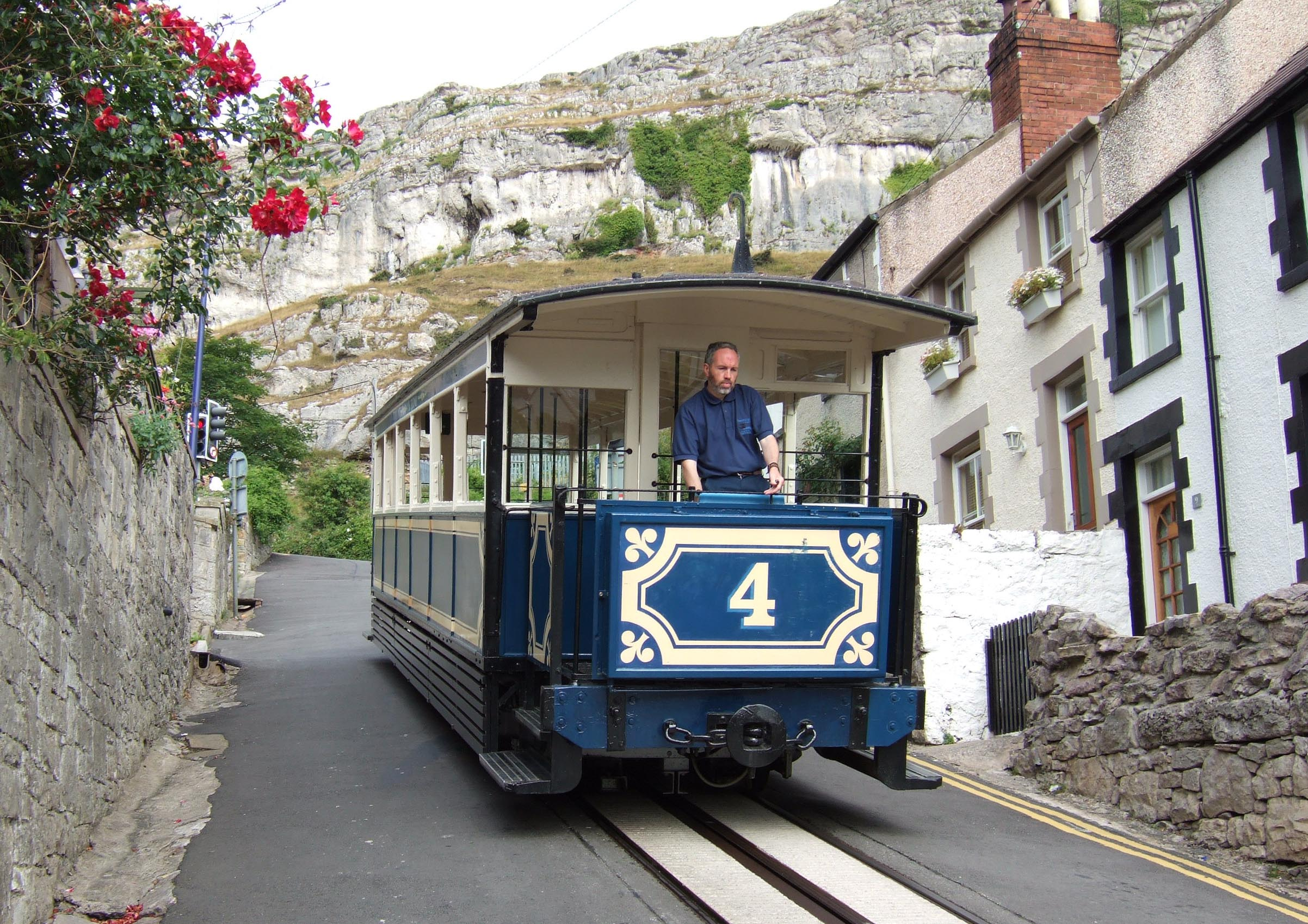
The Great Orme Tramway, a street-running funicular.

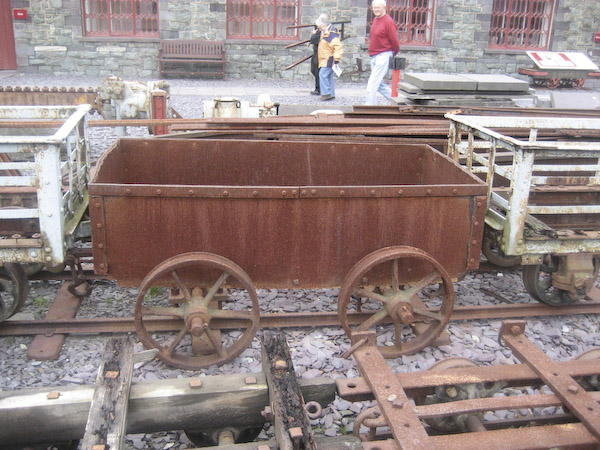
Horse-drawn slate wagon used on the Nantlle Railway, now preserved at the Welsh Slate Museum.

One of the first railways using 3 ft 6 in (1,067 mm) gauge track was the Little Eaton Gangway in England, constructed as a horse-drawn wagonway in 1795. Other 3 ft 6 in (1,067 mm) gauge wagonways in England and Wales were also built in the early 19th century. Also during this time, numerous tram networks were built in 3 ft 6 in (1,067 mm) gauge (see table below).

== Railways ==
Country/territory	Railway
England	Berkshire: Hill Train (located in Legoland Windsor) (separate 2 ft (610 mm) gauge railway named Orient Expedition also present) (operating); Buckinghamshire: Wolverton and Stony Stratford Tramway (defunct); Cambridgeshire: Peterborough Tramways (defunct); Cheshire: Chester Corporation Tramways (defunct); Cornwall: Camborne and Redruth Tramways (defunct); East Cornwall Mineral Railway (defunct); Cumbria: City of Carlisle Electric Tramways (defunct); Burneside Paper Mills Tramway (converted to standard gauge); Gatebeck Gunpowder Works (defunct); Low Wood Gunpowder Works (defunct); Walna Scar Slate Quarry (defunct); Derbyshire: Ilkeston Corporation Tramways (defunct); Little Eaton Gangway (defunct); Devon: Tramways in Exeter (defunct); Torquay Tramways (defunct); Tramways in Plymouth (defunct); Dorset: Bournemouth Corporation Tramways (defunct); Durham: Darlington Corporation Light Railways (defunct); Hartlepool Electric Tramways (defunct); Hartlepools Steam Tramways Company (defunct); South Shields Tramways (defunct); East Sussex: Brighton Corporation Tramways (defunct); Hastings and District Electric Tramways (defunct); Essex: Colchester Corporation Tramways (defunct); Southend Pier Railway (1930–1978) (converted to 3ft gauge); Southend-on-Sea Corporation Tramways (defunct); Gloucestershire: Cheltenham and District Light Railway (defunct); Gloucester Corporation Tramways (defunct); Monmouth Railway (defunct); Severn and Wye Railway (defunct); Greater Manchester: Wigan Corporation Tramways (defunct); Herefordshire: Kington Tramway (defunct); Kent: Dover Corporation Tramways (defunct); Guilford Tramway (defunct); Gravesend, Rosherville and Northfleet Tramways (defunct); Isle of Thanet Electric Tramways and Lighting Company (defunct); Maidstone Corporation Tramways (defunct); Sheerness and District Tramways (defunct); Lancashire: Blackburn and Over Darwen Tramways Company (defunct); Merseyside: Southport Pier Tramway (converted to 1 ft 11 1/2 in (597 mm) gauge, then converted back to 3 ft 6 in (1,067 mm) gauge) (defunct); Norfolk: Great Yarmouth Corporation Tramways (defunct); Norwich Electric Tramways (defunct); North Yorkshire: Scarborough Tramways Company (defunct); York Corporation Tramways (defunct); Northamptonshire: Northampton Corporation Tramways (defunct); Northampton Street Tramways (defunct); Northumberland: Tynemouth and District Electric Traction Company (defunct); Somerset: Taunton Tramway (defunct); South Yorkshire: Silkstone Waggonway (1809-c. 1870); Shropshire: Bridgnorth Cliff Railway (operating); Staffordshire: Burton and Ashby Light Railway (defunct); Burton upon Trent Corporation Tramways (defunct); Walsall Corporation Tramways (defunct); Suffolk: Ipswich Corporation Tramways (defunct); Ipswich Tramway (defunct); Lowestoft Corporation Tramways (defunct); West Midlands: Birmingham and Aston Tramways Company (defunct); Birmingham Corporation Tramways (defunct); City of Birmingham Tramways Company Ltd (defunct); Coventry Corporation Tramways (defunct); Dudley and Stourbridge Steam Tramways Company (defunct); Dudley, Stourbridge and District Electric Traction Company (defunct); Kinver Light Railway (defunct); South Staffordshire Tramways Company (defunct); Wolverhampton Corporation Tramways (defunct); Wolverhampton District Electric Tramways Company (defunct); West Sussex: Brighton and Shoreham Tramways (defunct); West Yorkshire: Halifax Corporation Tramways (defunct); Wiltshire: Swindon Corporation Tramways (defunct); Worcestershire: Kidderminster and Stourport Electric Tramway Company (defunct); Worcester Electric Traction Company (defunct)
Scotland	Cruden Bay Hotel Tramway (defunct); Dunfermline and District Tramways (defunct); Kirkcaldy Corporation Tramways (defunct); Perth and District Tramways (defunct); Perth Corporation Tramways (defunct); Rothesay and Ettrick Bay Light Railway (defunct); Wemyss and District Tramways Company (defunct)
Wales	Aberdare Urban District Council Tramways (defunct); Bryn Oer Tramway (defunct); Great Orme Tramway (operating); Hay Railway (defunct); Kington Tramway (defunct); Llandudno and Colwyn Bay Electric Railway (defunct); Merthyr Tydfil Electric Tramways (defunct); Monmouth Railway (defunct); Nantlle Railway (defunct); Newport Corporation Tramways (defunct); Pen-yr-Orsedd Quarry (1 ft 11 1/2 in (597 mm) gauge lines and dual gauge lines with 1 ft 11 1/2 in (597 mm) gauge track also present) (defunct); Pontypridd and Rhondda Valley Tramway (defunct); Pontypridd Urban District Council Tramways (defunct); Poole and District Electric Tramways (defunct); Pwllheli and Llanbedrog Tramway (defunct); Swansea Constitution Hill Incline Tramway (defunct); Wrexham and District Electric Tramways (defunct)

== See also ==
- British narrow-gauge railways
- Heritage railway
- 2 ft and 600 mm gauge railways in the United Kingdom
- 2 ft 6 in gauge railways in the United Kingdom
- 3 ft gauge railways in the United Kingdom
- 3 ft 6 in gauge railroads in the United States
