= 3 ft gauge railways in the United Kingdom =

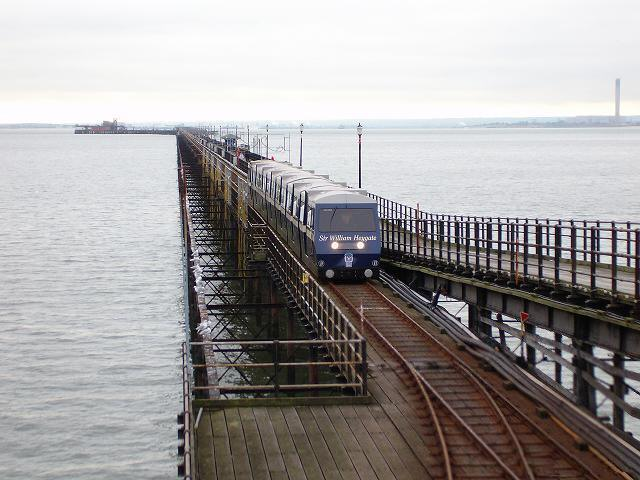
A diesel passenger train built by Severn Lamb running on the Southend Pier Railway in England.

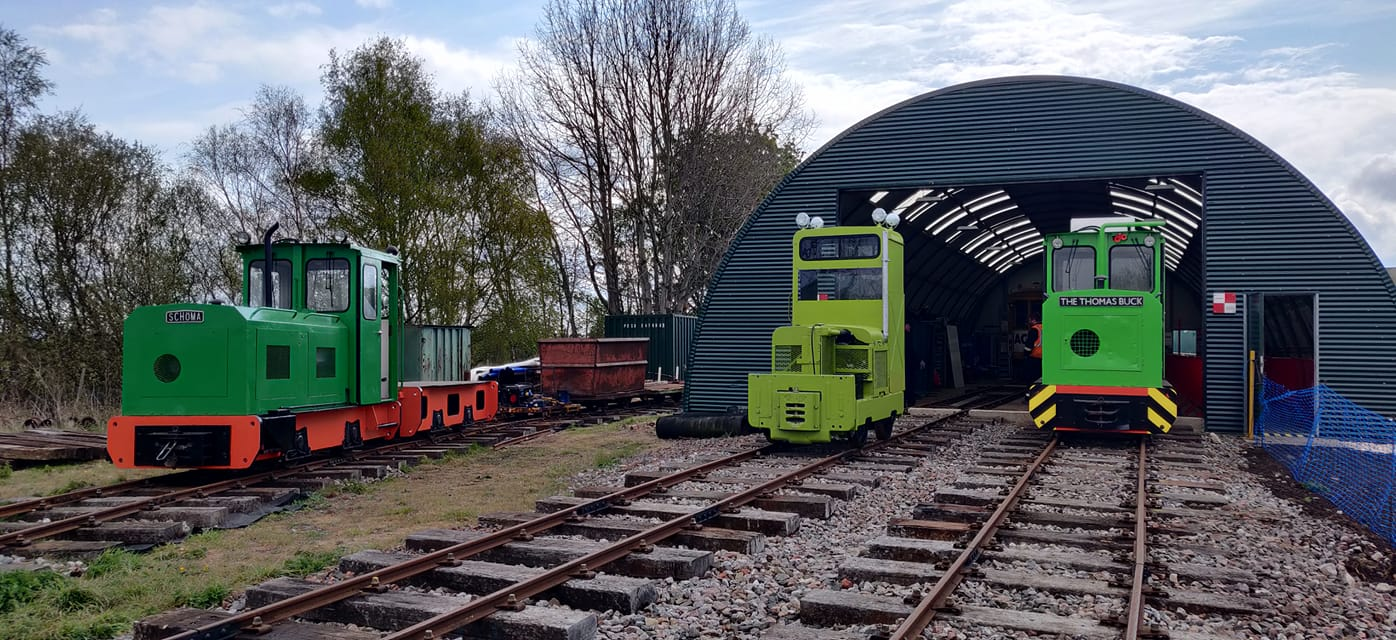
3ft gauge locomotives at Crowle Peatland Railway.

A list of 3 ft (914 mm) narrow-gauge railways in the United Kingdom.

The worldwide usage of locomotives on railways, including 3 ft (914 mm) gauge railways, has its origins in the United Kingdom in the early 19th century during the Industrial Revolution. In fact, in 1802, a 3 ft gauge plateway-type railway owned by the Coalbrookdale Company in England became the first railway in the world to have a locomotive designed and built for it. The locomotive's designer, Richard Trevithick, is credited with making the first recorded successful demonstration of a locomotive on rails (in 1804 on a different railway in Wales). 3 ft gauge locomotive-powered railways, along with other narrow-gauge railways of varying widths, would later become one of the most common railway gauges chosen for short-distance lines in the British Isles, such as those found in mines and industrial sites (see table below).

== Railways ==
Country/territory	Railway
England	Alan Keef Headquarters (private) (2 ft (610 mm) gauge lines and dual gauge lines with 2 ft (610 mm) gauge track also present) (all 3 ft (914 mm) gauge trackage is dual-gauged with 2 ft (610 mm) gauge trackage) (operating); British Moss Litter Company (defunct); City of Worcester Tramways Company (defunct); Coalbrookdale Company (world's first railway to have a locomotive designed and built for it; however, no record of a successful run of this locomotive exists) (gauge of locomotive itself slightly wider than 3 ft (914 mm) gauge due to railway's plateway design) (defunct); Crowle Peatland Railway (operating); Eastwell tramway (defunct); Geltsdale Reservoir Railway (defunct); Kettering Ironstone Railway (1876-1962); Moorends Works (standard-gauge lines also present) (defunct); Ravenglass and Eskdale Railway (converted to 15 in (381 mm) gauge) (operating); Redlake Tramway (defunct); Rye and Camber Tramway (defunct); Scropton Tramway (defunct); Southend Pier Railway (1986-present) (operating); Southwold Railway (defunct); Steep Grade Railway (defunct); Thorne and Hatfield Moors (defunct); Titterstone Clee Hill (defunct); Torrington and Marland Railway (defunct); Tramways Trust Company (defunct); Trevithick Shed (located in Blists Hill Victorian Town) (UNESCO World Heritage Site status shared with entire Ironbridge Gorge area) (separate standard-gauge railway named Hay Inclined Lift and separate 2 ft (610 mm) gauge railway named Mine Railway also present) (operating); Tynemouth and District Tramways (defunct); Woolsthorpe tramway (defunct); Worcester Tramways Company (defunct)
Northern Ireland	
Scotland	Lochaber Narrow Gauge Railway (dual gauge lines with standard-gauge track also present) (defunct); Skye Marble Railway (defunct); Strathbathie Light Railway (1900-1949)
Wales	Barmouth Junction and Arthog Tramway (defunct); Deep Mine Railway (located in Llechwedd Slate Caverns) (separate 1 ft 11 1/2 in (597 mm) gauge railway named Miners' Tramway also present) (operating); Gorseddau Tramway (defunct); Llanelly Tramways (defunct); Little Ormes Head Quarry Tramway (defunct); Penmaenmawr & Welsh Granite Co. (defunct); Porthgain Railway (defunct); Pwllheli and Llanbedrog Tramway (defunct)

== See also ==
- British narrow-gauge railways
- Heritage railway
- 2 ft and 600 mm gauge railways in the United Kingdom
- 2 ft 6 in gauge railways in the United Kingdom
- 3 ft gauge railroads in the United States
- Three foot six inch gauge railways in the United Kingdom
