= 2 ft 6 in gauge railways in the United Kingdom =

A list of 2 ft 6 in gauge railways in the United Kingdom.

== Installations ==
Country/territory	Railway
England	Alford and Sutton Tramway (defunct); Bowaters Paper Railway (defunct) (although later Sittingbourne and Kemsley Light Railway (operational)); Chattenden and Upnor Railway (converted from 18 in (457 mm) gauge) (defunct); Chillington Iron Company Tramway (defunct circa 1900); Great Whipsnade Railway (located in ZSL Whipsnade Zoo) (operating); Gunpowder Railway (located at Waltham Abbey Royal Gunpowder Mills) (operating); Leek and Manifold Valley Light Railway (defunct); Legoland Express (located in Legoland Windsor Resort) (operating); Oakhill Brewery (defunct); Pentewan Railway (defunct); Priddy's Hard Tramway (18 in (457 mm) gauge lines also present) (defunct); RNAD Broughton Moor (defunct); ROF Bridgwater (defunct); Statfold Barn Railway (private) (standard-gauge lines, dual-gauge lines with 2 ft 6 in (762 mm) gauge track and 2 ft (610 mm) gauge track, and triple-gauge lines also present) (operating); Swanage Pier Tramway (defunct); Tower Subway (defunct)
Scotland	Almond Valley Light Railway (operating); Carstairs House Tramway (defunct); Hagdale Chromate Railway (defunct); ROF Bishopton (standard-gauge lines also present) (defunct)
Wales	Crickheath Tramway (defunct); Deeside Tramway (defunct); Pwllheli Corporation Tramways (defunct); RNAD Trecwn (defunct); Welshpool and Llanfair Light Railway (operating)

== Gallery ==
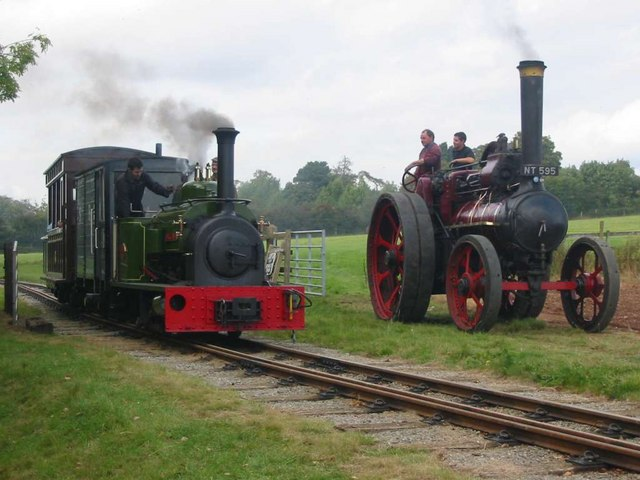
The private Statfold Barn Railway in England runs railway equipment with two different track gauges.

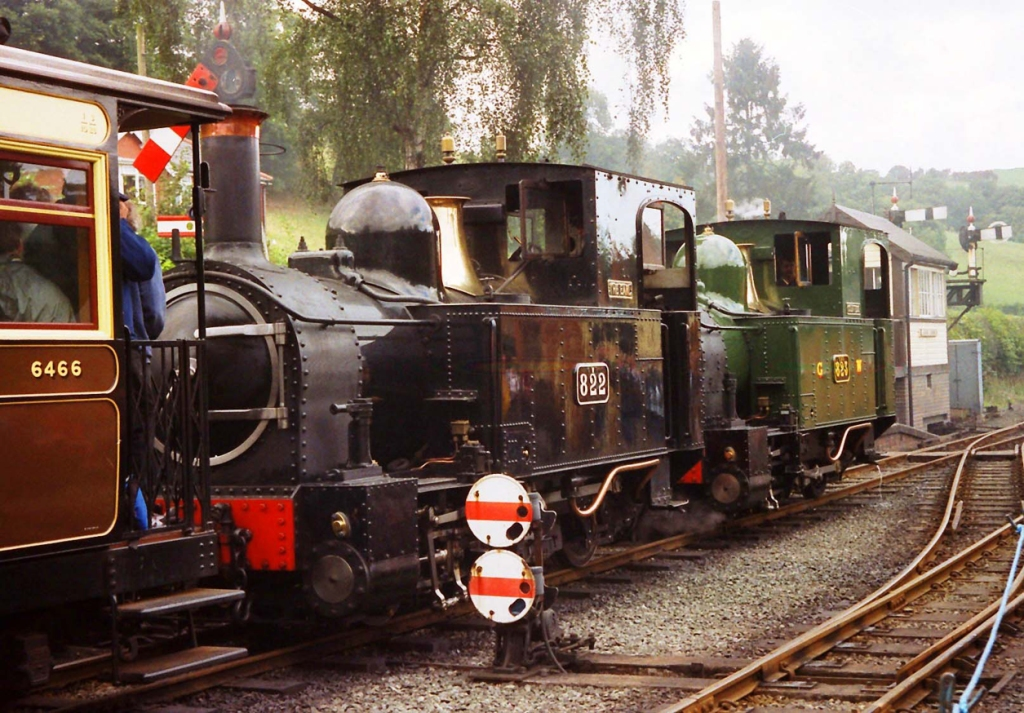
The Earl and The Countess locomotives at the Welshpool and Llanfair Light Railway in Wales.

== See also ==
- British narrow-gauge railways
- Heritage railway
- 2 ft and 600 mm gauge railways in the United Kingdom
- 2 ft 6 in gauge railroads in the United States
- 3 ft gauge railways in the United Kingdom
- Large amusement railways
- Three foot six inch gauge railways in the United Kingdom
