= 2 ft and 600 mm gauge railways in the United Kingdom =

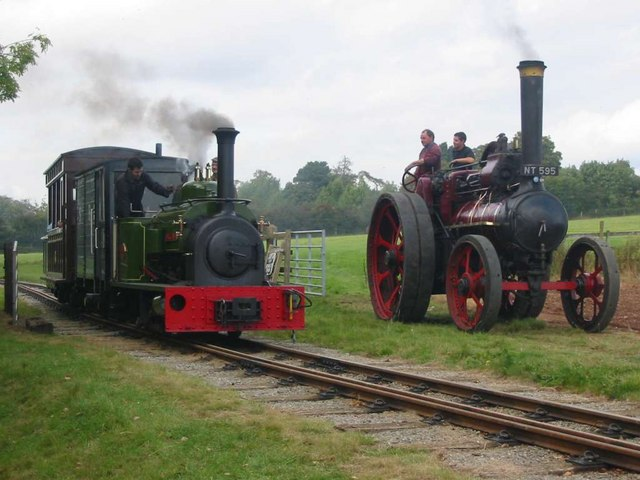
The private Statfold Barn Railway in England runs railway equipment with three different track gauges.

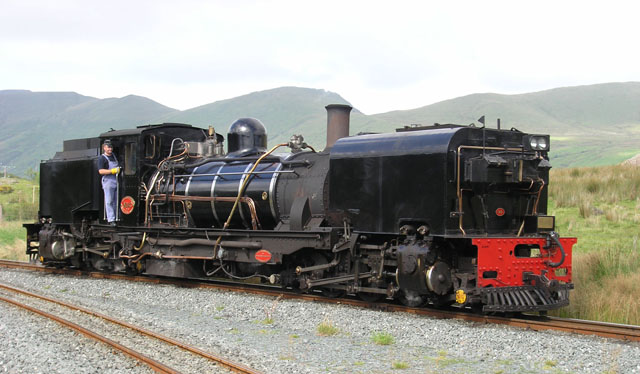
A South African Class NG G16 2-6-2+2-6-2 Garratt locomotive preserved in working condition on the Welsh Highland Railway.

A list of 2 ft (610 mm), 1 ft 11 3/4 in (603 mm), 600 mm (1 ft 11 5/8 in), and 1 ft 11 1/2 in (597 mm) narrow-gauge railways in the United Kingdom.

Country/territory	Railway	Gauge
England	Abbey Pumping Station (operating); Abbey Light Railway (defunct); Alan Keef Headquarters (private) (dual gauge lines with 3 ft (914 mm) gauge track also present) (operating); Amberley Museum Railway (located at the Amberley Museum & Heritage Centre) (operating); Amerton Railway (operating); Apedale Valley Light Railway (located in Apedale Community Country Park) (operating); Beeches Light Railway (private, closed); Bredgar and Wormshill Light Railway (operating); Bressingham Steam and Gardens (operating); Bromyard and Linton Light Railway (closed); Brymbo Ironworks Railway (defunct); Burnhope Reservoir railway (defunct); Cadeby Light Railway (defunct); Canada Creek Railway (located in Thorpe Park) (defunct - park still operating); Chessington Railroad (located in Chessington World of Adventures) (separate 12 in (305 mm) gauge railway named Chessington Zoo Railway previously present) (defunct - park still operating); Cliffe Hill Mineral Railway (defunct); Colne Valley Waterworks railway (defunct); Cotswold Wildlife Park & Gardens (operating); Coventry Colliery (defunct); Creekmoor Light Railway (defunct); Derbyshire Dales Narrow Gauge Railway (defunct); Devon Railway Centre (separate 7 1/4 in (184 mm) gauge railway also present) (operating); Drusillas Zoo Park "The Safari Express" (ex Thomas & Friends & ex Drusillas Park Railway); Eclipse Peat Company (defunct); Gartell Light Railway (operating); Golden Valley Light Railway (separate standard gauge railway named Midland Railway – Butterley and separate 5 in (127 mm) and 3 1/2 in (89 mm) gauge railway named Butterley Miniature Railway also present) (operating); Great Bush Railway (located in Tinkers Park) (operating); Hayling Seaside Railway (operating); Hollycombe Steam Collection (separate standard gauge railway and separate 7 1/4 in (184 mm) gauge railway also present) (operating); Hythe Pier Railway (operating); Kew Bridge Steam Museum (operating); Kempton Steam Railway (operating); Lea Bailey Light Railway (operating); Leighton Buzzard Light Railway (operating); Lincolnshire Coast Light Railway (relocated to Ingoldmells, 2009); London Pneumatic Despatch Company (3 ft 8 1/2 in (1,130 mm) gauge lines also present) (defunct); London Post Office Railway (now a museum); Lydd Ranges (private) (operating); Metropolitan Water Board Railway (defunct); Mine Railway (located in Blists Hill Victorian Town) (UNESCO World Heritage Site status shared with entire Ironbridge Gorge area) (separate standard gauge railway named Inclined Lift and separate 3 ft (914 mm) gauge railway named Trevithick Shed also present) (separate standard gauge railway named Hay Inclined Plane also present as a static exhibit) (operating); North Gloucestershire Railway (operating); North Ings Farm Museum (operating); North Surrey Joint Sewage Board railways (defunct); Nursery Railway (located in Bressingham Steam and Gardens) (separate standard gauge railway, separate 15 in (381 mm) gauge railway named Waveney Valley Railway, and separate 10 1/4 in (260 mm) gauge railway named Garden Railway also present) (operating); Old Kiln Light Railway (located at the Rural Life Living Museum) (operating); Orient Expedition (located in Legoland Windsor) (separate 3 ft 6 in (1,067 mm) gauge railway named Hill Train also present) (operating); Park Railway (located in Alton Towers) (separate 15 in (381 mm) gauge lines and separate 15 in (381 mm) gauge railway named Adventure Railway previously present) (defunct - park still operating); Penlee Quarry railway (defunct); Polperro Express (located in Drayton Manor Theme Park) (operating); Richmond Light Railway (private) (operating); South Tynedale Railway (operating); Statfold Barn Railway (private) (standard gauge lines, dual gauge lines with 2 ft 6 in (762 mm) gauge track and 2 ft (610 mm) gauge track, and triple gauge lines also present) (operating); Stevington and Turvey Light Railway (operating); Telford Town Tramway (separate standard gauge railway named Telford Steam Railway also present) (operating); Thomas Land Railway (located in Drayton Manor Theme Park) (operating); Threlkeld Quarry Railway (located at the Threlkeld Quarry & Mining Museum) (operating); Treasure Island Railway (located in Thorpe Park) (defunct - park still operating); Tunnel Railway (defunct); Volk's Electric Railway (converted to 2 ft 9 in (838 mm) gauge, then converted to 2 ft 8 1/2 in (825 mm) gauge) (operating); West Lancashire Light Railway (operating); Westonzoyland Light Railway (located at the Westonzoyland Pumping Station Museum of Steam Power & Land Drainage) (operating); Wicksteed Park Railway (located in Wicksteed Park) (operating); Woodhead Tunnel 2 (private) (operating); Woodhorn Narrow Gauge Railway (located at the Woodhorn Museum and Northumberland Archives) (operating); Yaxham Light Railway (operating)	2 ft (610 mm)
England	Honister Slate Mine (private) (operating); Lynton and Barnstaple Railway (converted from 1 ft 11 1/2 in (597 mm) gauge) (operating)	600 mm (1 ft 11 5/8 in)
England	Ashover Light Railway (defunct); Knebworth Park and Winter Green Railway (defunct); Launceston Steam Railway (operating); Lincolnshire potato railways (defunct); Lynbarn Railway (located in Milky Way Adventure Park) (operating); Royal Arsenal Railway (standard gauge lines, 18 in (457 mm) gauge lines, and dual gauge lines with standard gauge track and 18 in (457 mm) gauge track also present) (defunct); Southport Pier Tramway (converted from 3 ft 6 in (1,067 mm) gauge, then converted back to 3 ft 6 in (1,067 mm) gauge) (operating)	1 ft 11 1/2 in (597 mm)
Scotland	Alford Valley Railway (operating); Ardkinglas Railway (defunct); Duchal Moor Railway (defunct); HM Factory, Gretna (crossed into England) (defunct); Leadhills and Wanlockhead Railway (operating); Leadhills Tramway (defunct); Lealt Valley Diatomite Railway (defunct)	2 ft (610 mm)
Wales	Bala Lake Railway (operating); Cedryn Quarry Tramway (defunct); Clogau Gold Mine (operational status unknown); Cowlyd Tramway (defunct); Croesor Tramway (defunct); Deep Navigation Colliery (defunct); Dinorwic Railway (defunct); Eigiau Quarry Tramway (defunct); Eigiau Reservoir Tramway (converted from standard gauge) (defunct); Fairbourne Railway (converted to 15 in (381 mm) gauge, then converted to 12 1/4 in (311 mm) gauge) (dual gauge lines with 18 in (457 mm) gauge track and 15 in (381 mm) gauge track previously present) (operating); Gleision Colliery (operating); Gorseddau Junction and Portmadoc Railway (converted from 3 ft (914 mm) gauge) (defunct); Hendre-Ddu Tramway (defunct); Kerry Tramway (defunct); Margam Park Train (located in Margam Country Park) (operating); Teifi Valley Railway (converted from 7 ft 1/4 in (2,140 mm) Brunel gauge, then converted from standard gauge) (operating)	2 ft (610 mm)
Wales	Brecon Mountain Railway (operating); Vale of Rheidol Railway (converted from 1 ft 11 1/2 in (597 mm) gauge) (operating)	1 ft 11 3/4 in (603 mm)
Wales	Blaen y Cwm Quarry (defunct); Cwt y Bugail Quarry (2 ft 2 in (660 mm) gauge lines also present) (defunct); Festiniog and Blaenau Railway (defunct); Ffestiniog Railway (operating); Llanberis Lake Railway (operating); Miners' Tramway (located in Llechwedd Slate Caverns) (separate 3 ft (914 mm) gauge railway named Deep Mine Railway also present) (operating); National Slate Museum (operating); North Wales Narrow Gauge Railways (defunct); Pen-yr-Orsedd Quarry (3 ft 6 in (1,067 mm) gauge lines and dual gauge lines with 3 ft 6 in (1,067 mm) gauge track also present) (defunct); Portmadoc, Beddgelert and South Snowdon Railway (defunct); Rhiwbach Tramway (defunct); Trefor Quarry railway (defunct); Welsh Highland Heritage Railway (separate 7 1/4 in (184 mm) gauge railway also present) (operating); Welsh Highland Railway (owned by the Ffestiniog Railway) (operating)	1 ft 11 1/2 in (597 mm)

== See also ==
- British narrow-gauge railways
- The Great Little Trains of Wales
- Heritage railway
- 2 ft gauge railroads in the United States
- 2 ft 6 in gauge railways in the United Kingdom
- 3 ft gauge railways in the United Kingdom
- Large amusement railways
- Three foot six inch gauge railways in the United Kingdom
