= 3 ft 6 in gauge railways =

Railway track gauge (106.7 cm)

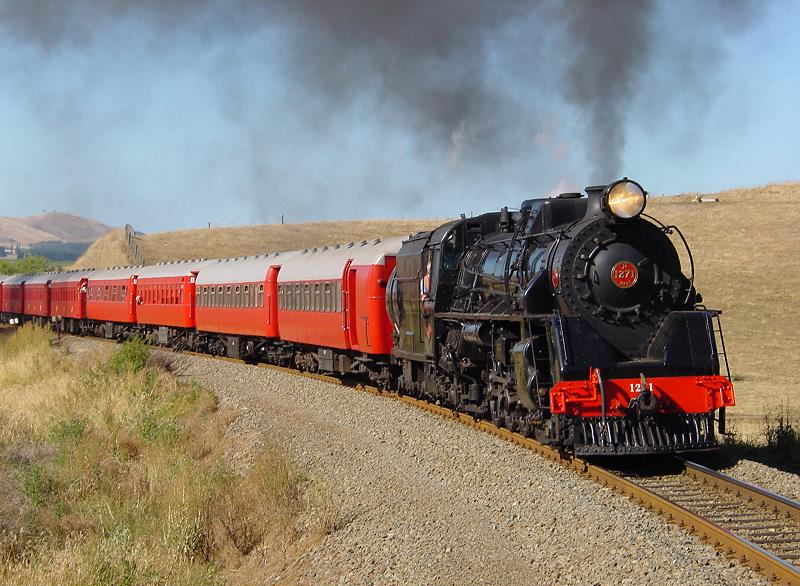
JA1271 with excursion consist climbing the Opapa incline in New Zealand

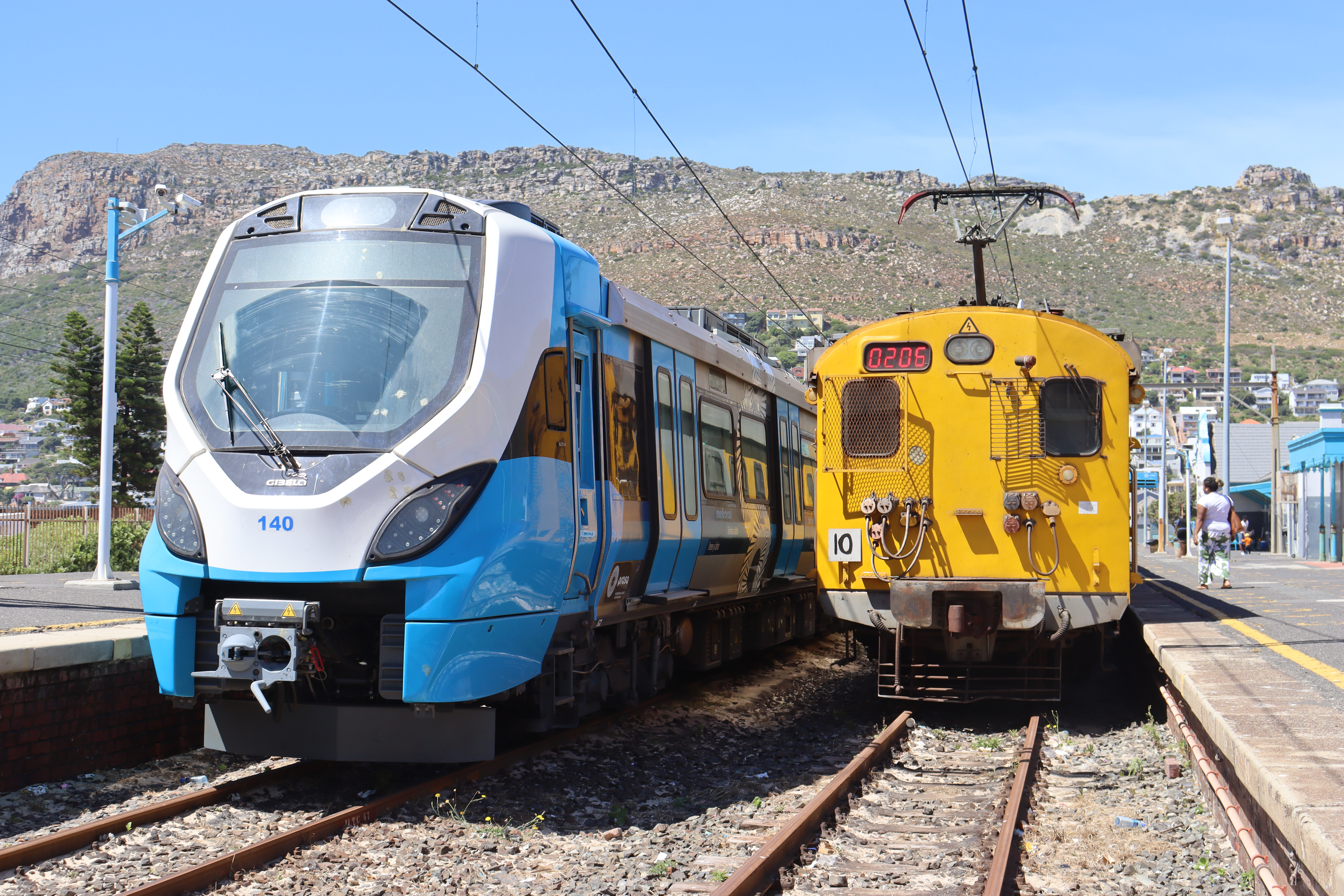
Cape gauge X'Trapolis Mega and Class 5M2 in Cape Town, South Africa

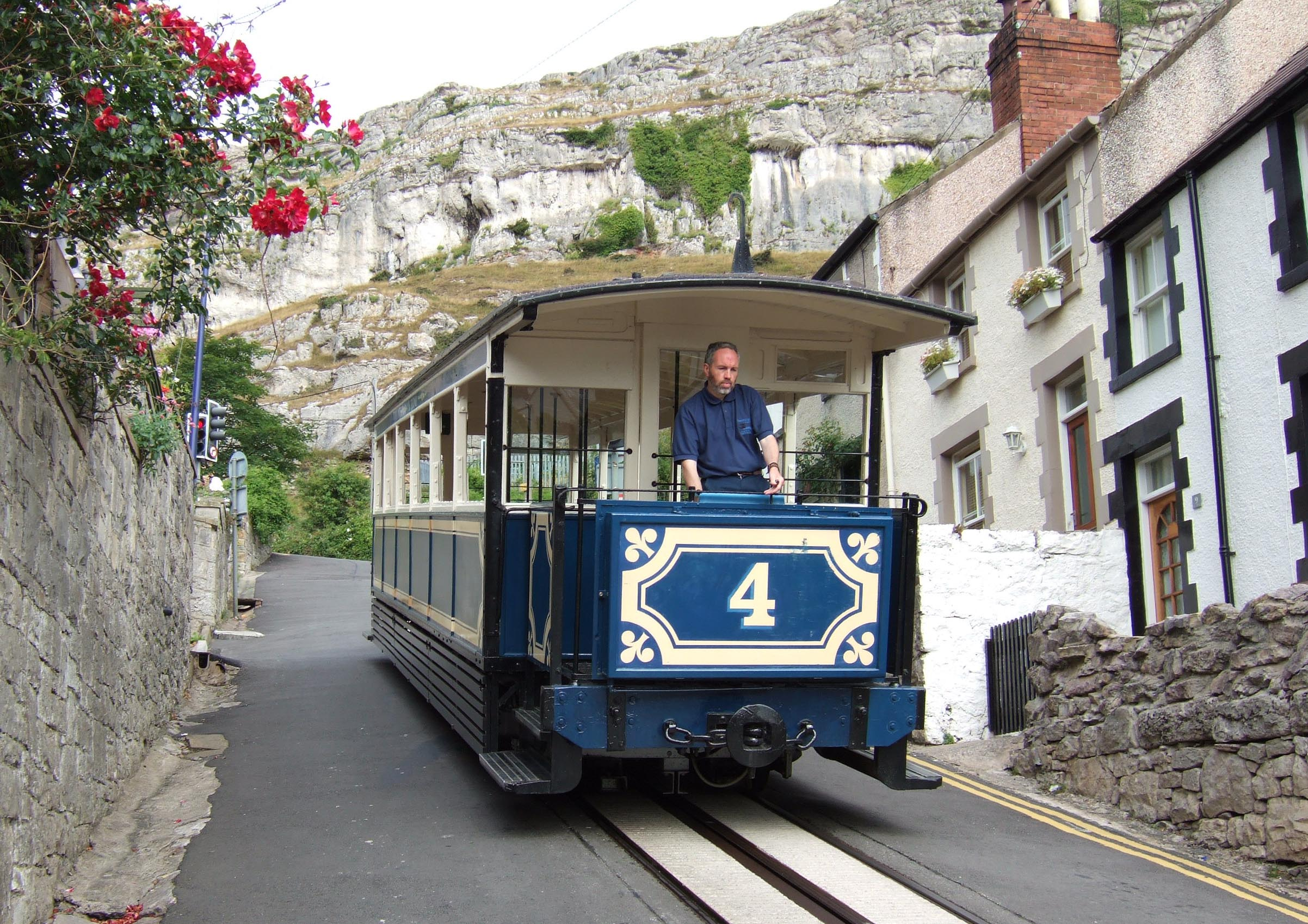
Tram descending the Great Orme Tramway

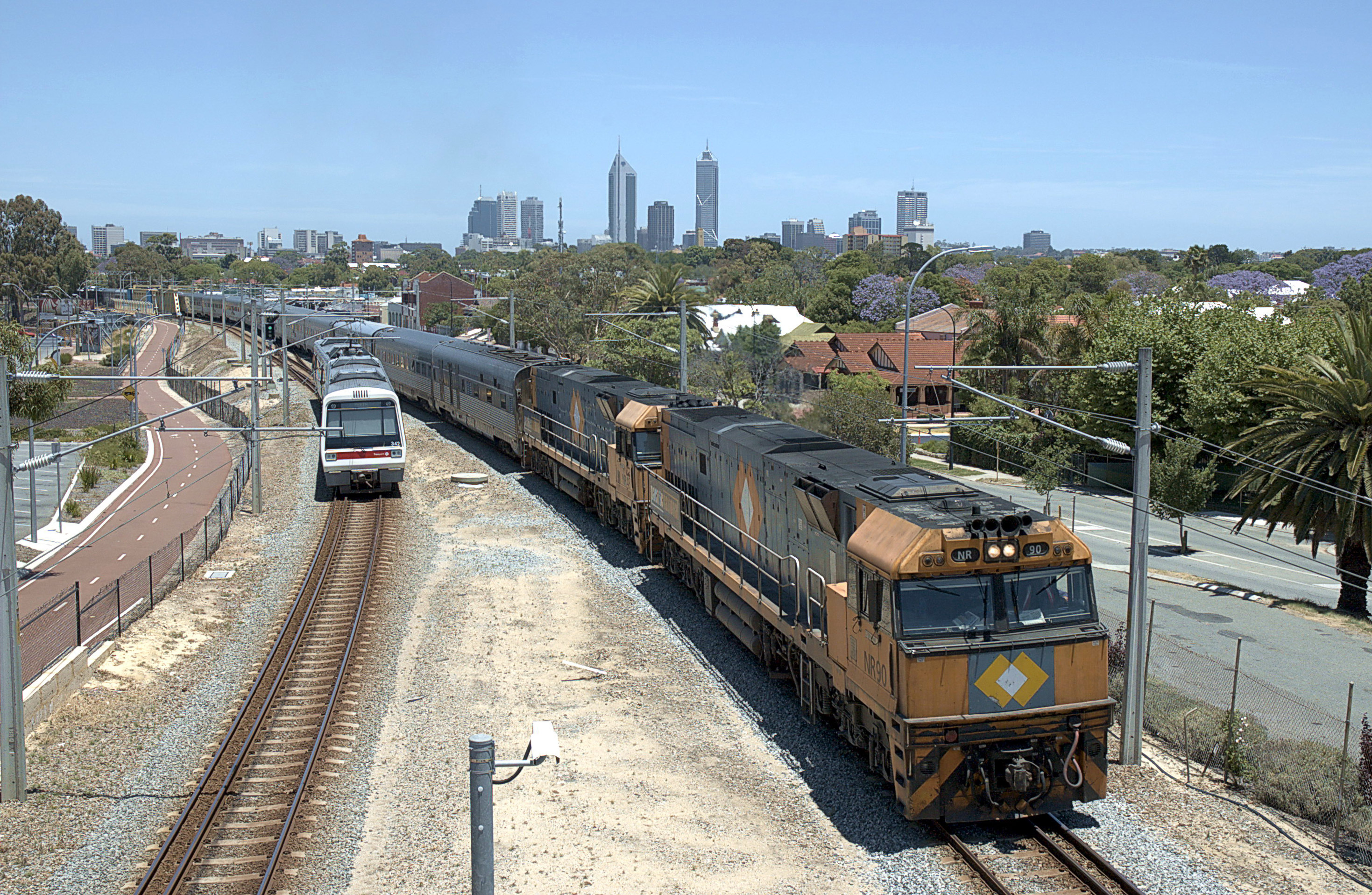
Dual gauge track in Perth Australia with both 3ft 6in and standard gauge

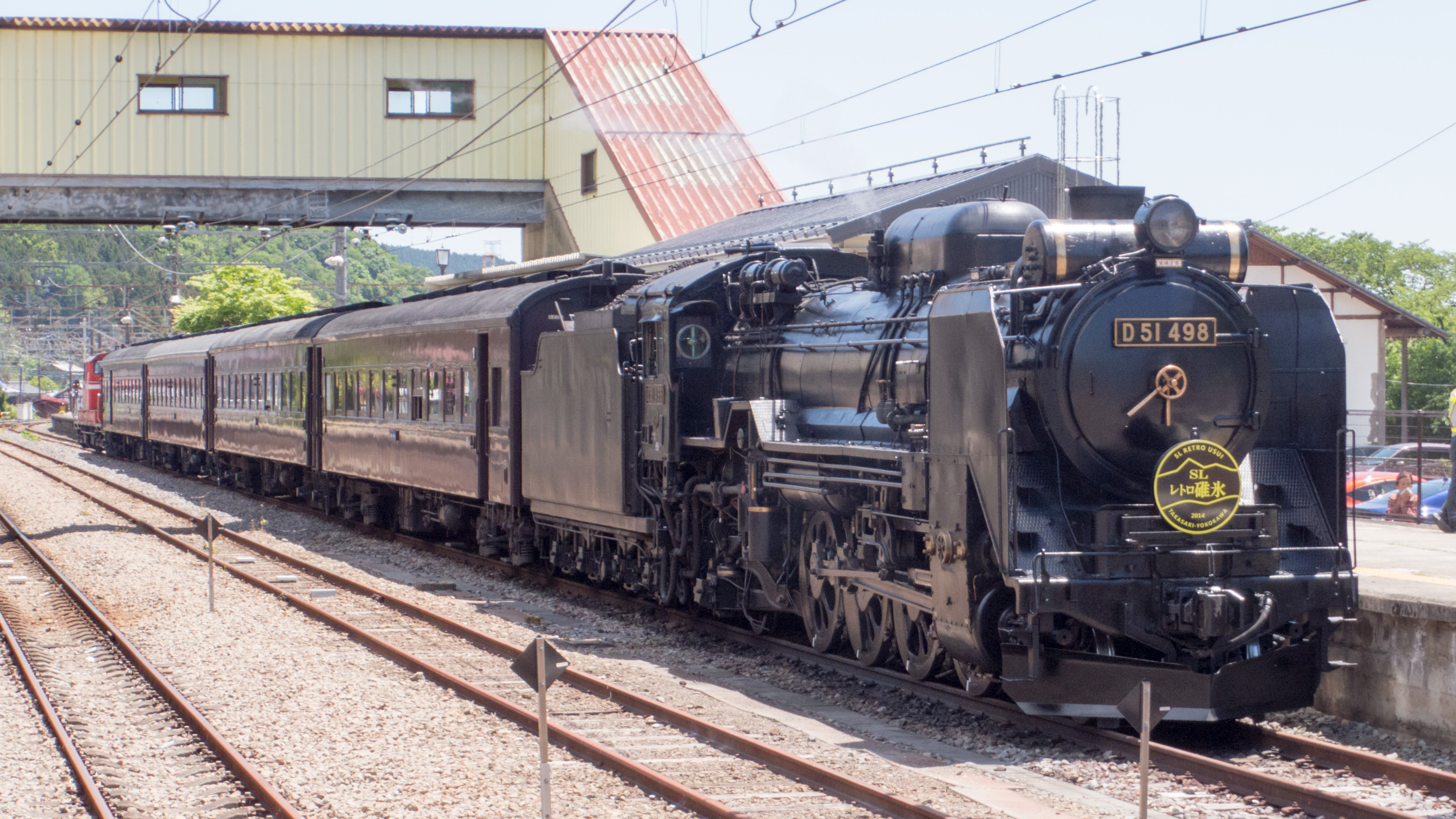
A preserved Japanese JNR Class D51 in main line service in 2014

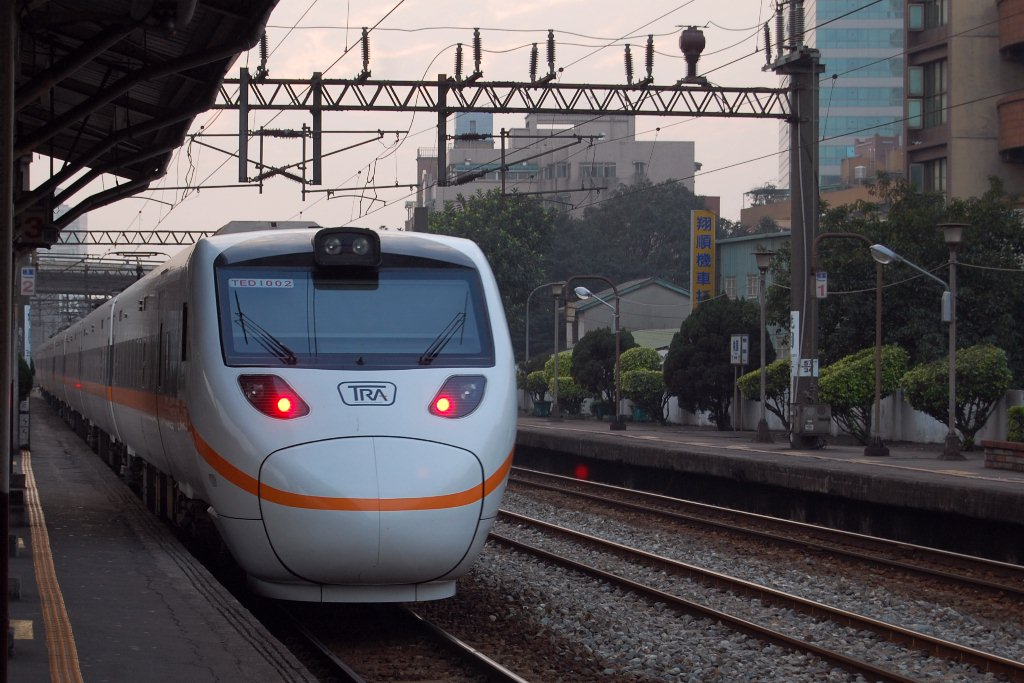
The Taroko Express in Taiwan

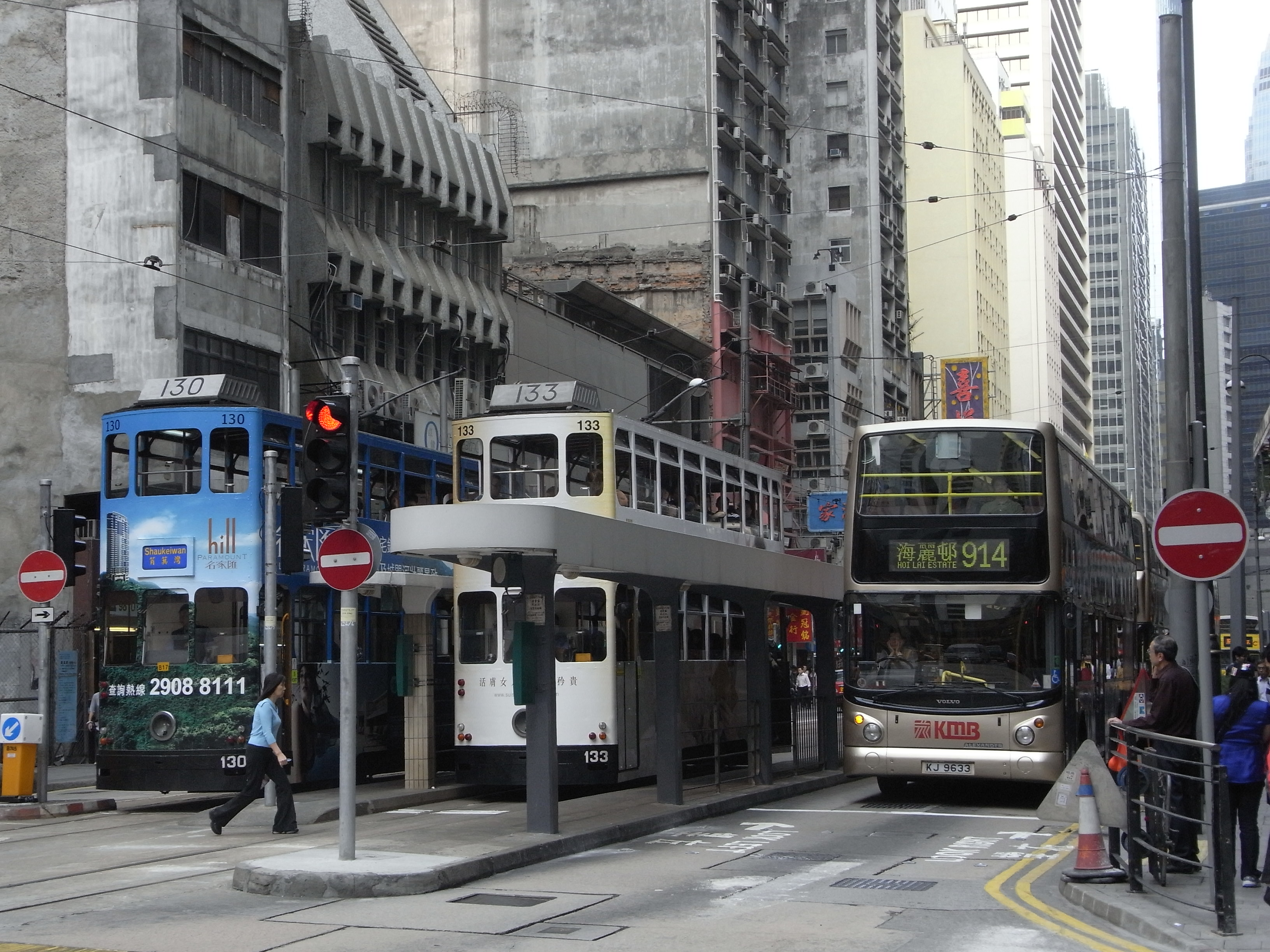
Sheung Wan station on Hong Kong Tramway with bus interchange

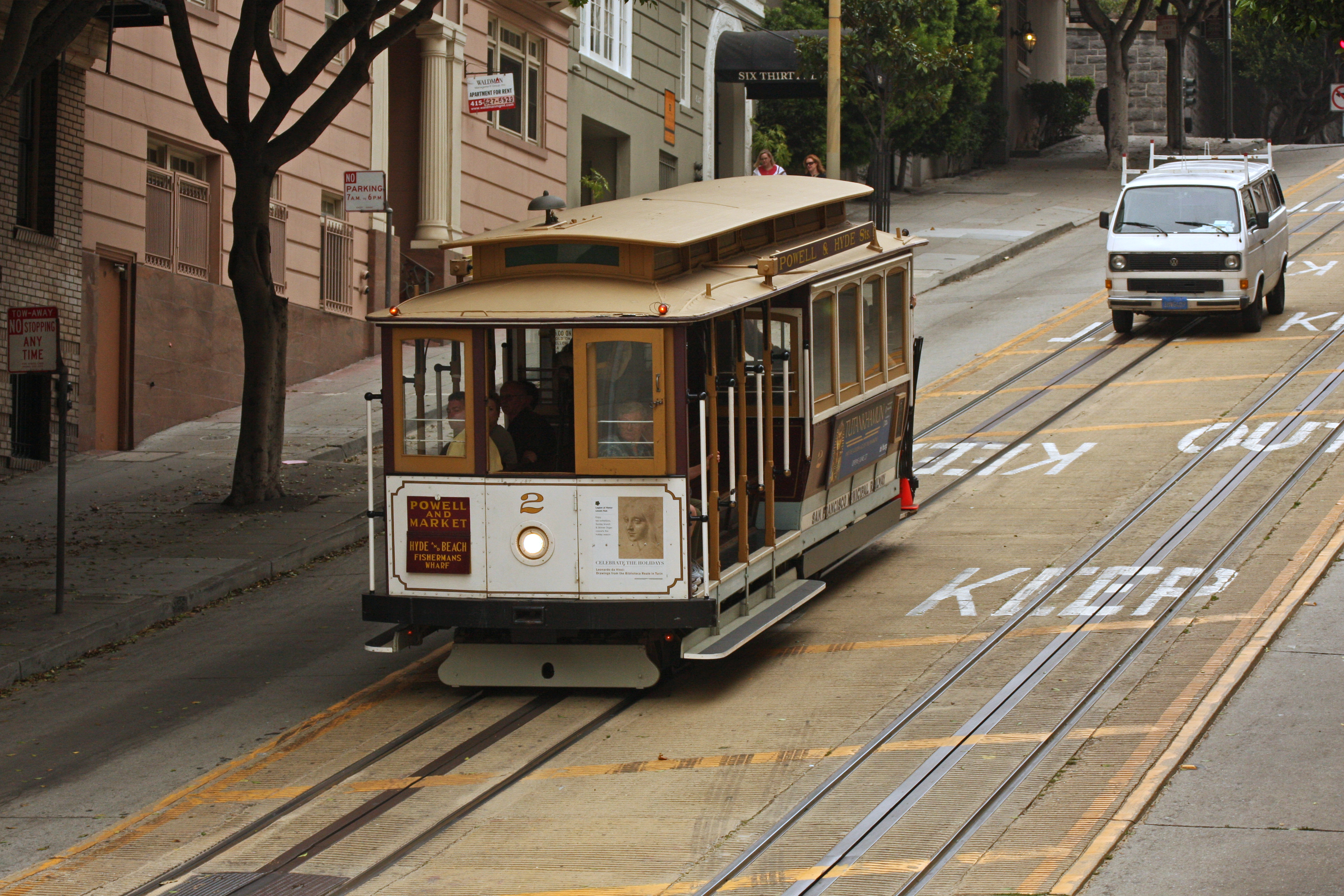
San Francisco cable car traversing a hill

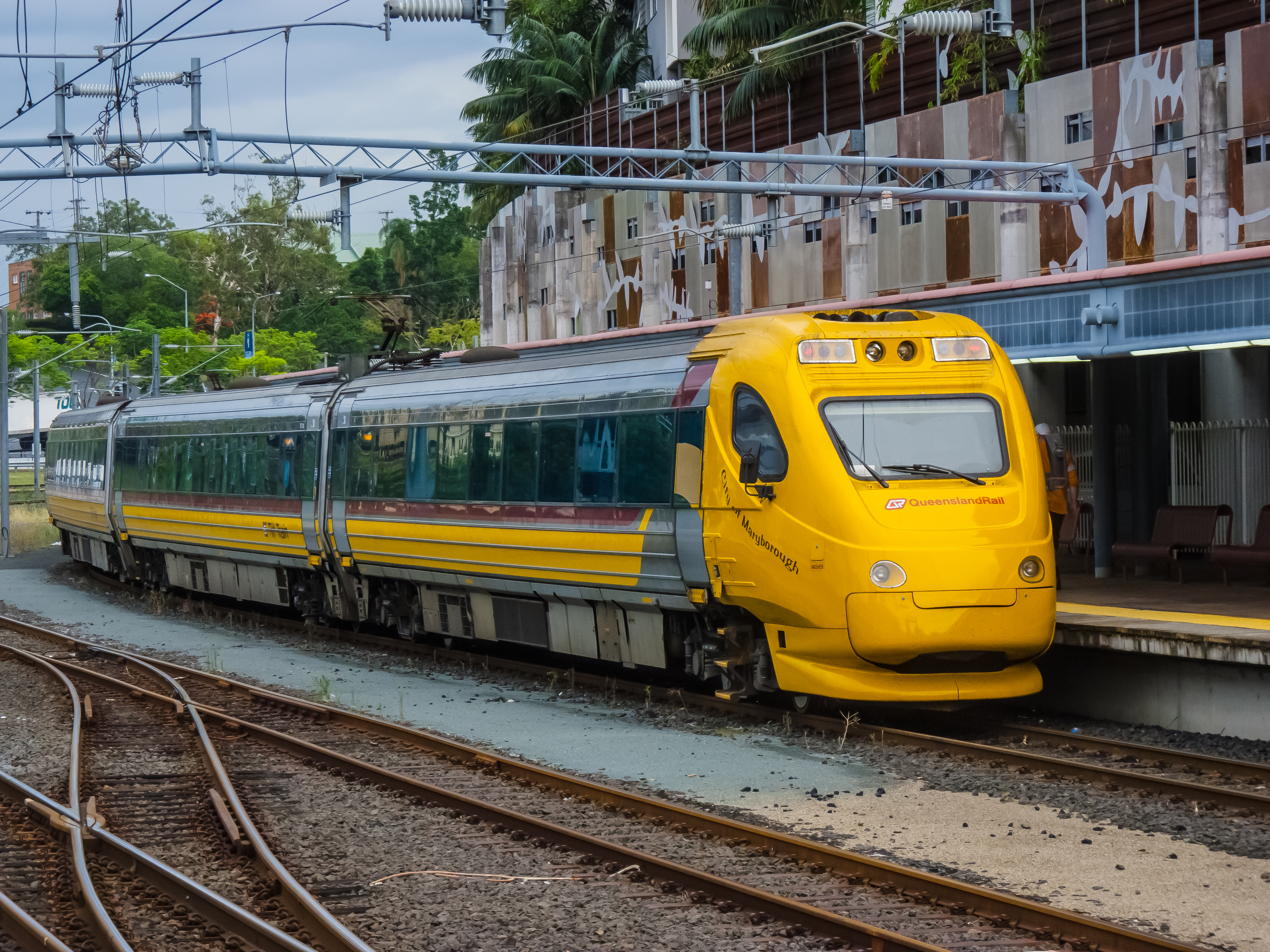
The Electric Tilt Train from Queensland, Australia is the fastest narrow-gauge train type in the world, having reached 210 km/h (130 mph)

Railways with a track gauge of 3 feet 6 inches (1,067 mm) were first constructed as horse-drawn wagonways. The first intercity passenger railway to use the 3 ft 6 in gauge was constructed in Norway by Carl Abraham Pihl. From the mid-nineteenth century, the gauge became widespread in the British Empire. In Africa it became known as the Cape gauge as it was adopted as the standard gauge for the Cape Government Railways in 1873, even though it had already been established in Australia and New Zealand before that. It was adopted as a standard in New Zealand, South Africa, Indonesia, Japan, the Philippines, Taiwan, and Queensland (which has the second largest narrow gauge network in the world) in Australia.

There are approximately 112,000 kilometres (70,000 mi) of 1,067 mm gauge track in the world, which are classified as narrow-gauge railways.

== History ==
1795
One of the first railways to use 3 ft 6 in (1,067 mm) gauge was the Little Eaton Gangway in England, constructed as a horse-drawn wagonway in 1795. Other 3 ft 6 in gauge wagonways in England and Wales were also built in the early nineteenth century.
1809
The Silkstone Waggonway was opened, connecting the Barnsley Canal to collieries including the Huskar Pit.
1860
The Severn and Wye Railway introduces a steam locomotive on its 3 ft 6 in gauge plateway.
1862
The Norwegian engineer Carl Abraham Pihl constructed the first 3 ft 6 in gauge railway in Norway, the Røros Line.
1865
The Queensland Railways were constructed. Its 3 ft 6 in gauge was promoted by the Irish engineer Abraham Fitzgibbon and consulting engineer Charles Fox.
1867
The construction of the railroad from the Castillo de Buitrón mine to the pier of San Juan del Puerto, Huelva, Spain, began. The width was 3 ft 6 in (1,067 mm).
1868
In 1868 Charles Fox asked civil engineer Edmund Wragge to survey a 3 ft 6 in railway in Costa Rica.
1870
The 3 ft 6 in was adopted by New Zealand to expedite the development of transport under Julius Vogel's Great Public Works Policy; see The Vogel Era.
1871
On September 16th 1871, The Dutch East Indies Railway Company open and operated Batavia-Koningsplein(Gambir) section on Batavia-Buitenzorg Railway. This railway line was using 3ft 6in (1067mm) and the third country that installed these railway gauge after Queensland and Norwegia. The Canadian Toronto, Grey and Bruce Railway and the Toronto and Nipissing Railway were opened, promoted by Pihl and Fitzgibbon and surveyed by Wragge as an engineer of Fox. The Canadian province of Prince Edward Island began building its 3 ft 6 in network.
1872
In January Robert Fairlie advocated the use of 3 ft 6 in gauge in his book Railways Or No Railways: Narrow Gauge, Economy with Efficiency v. Broad Gauge, Costliness with Extravagance.
The first 3 ft 6 in gauge railway opened in Japan. It had been proposed by the British civil engineer Edmund Morel based on his experience building railways in New Zealand.
1873
On 1 January, the first 3 ft 6 in gauge railway was opened in New Zealand, constructed by the British firm John Brogden and Sons. Earlier built 4 ft 8 1/2 in (1,435 mm) and broad gauge railways were soon converted to the narrower gauge.
The Cape Colony adopted the 3 ft 6 in gauge. After conducting several studies, the Molteno Government selected the gauge as being the most economically suited for traversing steep mountain ranges. Beginning in 1873, under supervision of Railway engineer of the Colony William Brounger, the Cape Government Railways rapidly expanded and the gauge became the standard for southern Africa.
1876
Natal also converted its short 10 kilometres (6.2 miles) long Durban network from 4 ft 8 1/2 in (1,435 mm) standard gauge prior to commencing with construction of a network across the entire colony in 1876. Other new railways in Southern Africa, notably Mozambique, Bechuanaland, the Rhodesias, Nyasaland and Angola, were also constructed in 3 ft 6 in gauge during that time.
After 1876
In the late nineteenth and early twentieth century numerous 3 ft 6 in gauge tram systems were built in the United Kingdom and the Netherlands. Newfoundland began its Cape gauge network in 1881.

== Nomenclature ==
This gauge is sometimes called Cape gauge, named after the Cape Colony in what is now South Africa, which adopted it in 1873. "Cape gauge" was used in several English-speaking countries. The equivalent of Cape gauge is used in other languages, such as the Dutch kaapspoor, German Kapspur, Norwegian kappspor and French voie cape. After metrication in the 1960s, the gauge was referred to in official South African Railways publications as 1,065 mm (3 ft 5 15/16 in) instead of 1067 mm.

In Sweden, the gauge was nicknamed Blekinge gauge, as most of the railways in the province of Blekinge had this gauge.

Colonial Gauge was used in New Zealand.

In Australia, this gauge is typically referred to as narrow gauge in comparison to 4 ft 8 1/2 in (1,435 mm) standard gauge or 5 ft 3 in (1,600 mm) broad gauge. In some instances, simply 3 foot 6 inch — or in rarer cases medium gauge — is used to distinguish it from other narrow gauges.

In Dutch East Indies now. Indonesia this gauge called as Indische Normaalspoor because this gauge used widely as Standard Gauge for railway system. This gauge was match with the geography condition of Indonesia especially Java and Sumatra Islands.

In Japan the 1,067 mm (3 ft 6 in) gauge, along with other narrow gauges, is referred to as kyōki (狭軌; lit. 'narrow gauge') to differentiate it from the standard gauge Shinkansen lines. It is also commonly referred to as 36 gauge (三六軌間), which is derived from the 3 ft 6 in width.

== Similar gauges ==
Similar, but incompatible without wheelset adjustment, rail gauges in respect of aspects such as cost of construction, practical minimum radius curves and the maximum physical dimensions of rolling stock are:

- 1,100 mm (3 ft 7 5/16 in),
- 1,093 mm (3 ft 7 in),
- 1,055 mm (3 ft 5 1/2 in),
- 1,050 mm (3 ft 5 11/32 in), and
- 1,000 mm (3 ft 3 3/8 in) metre gauge.

Dual gauge between 1,067 mm (3 ft 6 in) gauge and another similar gauge can make these bonus gauges.

- 1,435 mm (4 ft 8 1/2 in) standard gauge,
- 1,372 mm (4 ft 6 in), (4 ft 6 in gauge railway) and
- 1,668 mm (5 ft 5 21/32 in)
- 1,676 mm (5 ft 6 in) (The maximum bonus gauge from 1,000 mm (3 ft 3 3/8 in) meter gauge gauntlet tracks).

== Usage ==
Country/territory	Notes
Angola	Rail transport in Angola, some converted from 2 ft (610 mm) gauge and 1,000 mm (3 ft 3 3/8 in) metre gauge. Some isolated.
Australia	See also: Rail gauge in Australia 11,930 km (7,410 mi). New South Wales: the heritage Zig Zag Railway. Queensland: 7,600.6 km (4,722.8 mi). South Australia: the isolated Eyre Peninsula Railway, BHP Whyalla Tramway, and the heritage Pichi Richi Railway. Victoria: the heritage Bellarine Railway line. Tasmania: 614.4 km (381.8 mi). Western Australia: 2,642.1 km (1,641.7 mi). Northern Territory (closed).
Barbados	Barbados Railway (converted to 2 ft 6 in or 762 mm gauge) (defunct)
Botswana	The Botswana Railways system consists of 888 kilometres (552 mi) of 3 ft 6 in (1,067 mm) gauge track.
Canada	See also: Narrow-gauge railways in Canada Western New Brunswick until gauge conversion in the 1880s; the Newfoundland Railway until abandonment in September 1988; and the Prince Edward Island Railway until gauge conversion in 1930 following a car ferry connection with the main North America system.
China	South Manchuria Railway — built to 1,524 mm (5 ft) as part of the Chinese Eastern Railway, converted by advancing Japanese troops during the Russo-Japanese War of 1904–1905 to Japanese 1,067 mm (3 ft 6 in) gauge, converted to standard gauge after the war by the new South Manchuria Railway Company.
Congo, Democratic Republic of	3621 km 3 ft 6 in (1,067 mm) gauge (858 km or 533 mi electrified). Some converted from 1,000 mm (3 ft 3 3/8 in) and 2 ft 6 in (762 mm) gauge.
Congo, Republic of	The Congo–Ocean Railway, 502 kilometres (312 mi) long (operating).
Costa Rica	Operation of the national railway network was suspended in 1995 after an earthquake. As of 2013, some suburban lines are operational.
Denmark	Only export test tracks
Dominican Republic	Samaná to Santiago Railway, (later Ferrocarriles Unidos Dominicanos) 139 km (86 mi), in operation from 1887 to 1976 (defunct)
Ecuador	Empresa de Ferrocarriles Ecuatorianos, 965 km (600 mi)
Estonia	Tallinn tram of 38 km (24 mi), on all lines from the beginning in 1888, only on some lines in 1915–1931, and again on all lines from 1931.
Eswatini	301 kilometres (187 mi), only for transportation of goods, not passengers
Ghana	The national rail network of 935 km (581 mi) is undergoing major rehabilitation.
Haiti	Saint-Marc line (defunct)
Honduras	Main article: Rail transport in Honduras
Hong Kong	Hong Kong Tramways
Indonesia	8,159 km (5,070 mi) as of 2014, with only 4,816 km (2,993 mi) operational. Most common gauge for main lines of Sumatra and Java. The first railway was actually built to standard gauge (the Semarang–Solo–Yogyakarta corridor), but later lines were built to cape-gauge size owing to economic feasibility. The remainder of standard gauge lines were regauged by Japanese army during World War II to 3 ft 6 in (1,067 mm) gauge, with parts using standard gauge sleepers. The gauge is also used by KRL Commuterline, Jakarta MRT and Palembang LRT.
Ireland	Main article: List of narrow-gauge railways in Ireland
Isle of Man	Snaefell Mountain Railway
Japan	22,301 km (13,857 mi). First track gauge introduced. All JR Group lines and some private railways use this gauge except for high-speed shinkansen lines and Jukkokutōge Cable Car which use standard gauge.: Amanohashidate Cable Car; Beppu Rakutenchi Cable Line; Ikoma Cable Line; Keifuku Cable Line; Keihan Cable Line; Kurobe Cable Car; Mount Tsukuba Cable Car; Nankai Cable Line; Nishi-Shigi Cable Line; Ōyama Cable Car; Rokko Cable Line; Sakamoto Cable; Takaotozan Railway; Tateyama Cable Car; Yakuri Cable
Jersey	Jersey Railway (defunct). Partly converted from 4 ft 8 1/2 in (1,435 mm) standard gauge
Malawi	Malawi Railways has 797 km (495 mi) of 3 ft 6 in (1,067 mm) gauge railways.
Mozambique	Mozambique Ports and Railways operates 2,983 km (1,854 mi) of 3 ft 6 in (1,067 mm) gauge.
Namibia	TransNamib operates 2,883 km (1,791 mi) of 3 ft 6 in (1,067 mm) gauge, partly converted from 600 mm (1 ft 11 5/8 in) gauge.
Netherlands	Some tramway systems (all defunct)
New Zealand	3,900 km (2,400 mi), standardized by the Public Works Act 1870
Nicaragua	373 km (232 mi) of track until closure of the national rail network in 1993. All lifted and scrapped.
Nigeria	Nigerian Railway Corporation operates an isolated network of 3,505 kilometers (2,178 mi) 3 ft 6 in (1,067 mm) gauge single track lines.
Norway	The gauge was first used by C A Pihl on the Hamar-Grundset Line, opened 23 June 1862. Most lines were 3 ft 6 in (1,067 mm) gauge lines built in the 19th century were rebuilt to standard gauge between 1904 and 1949. The Setesdal Line, a heritage railway line of about eight km remains 3 ft 6 in (1,067 mm) gauge.
Panama	Panama Tramways Company (1913–1917) and the Panama Electric Company (1917–1941).
Philippines	The Philippine National Railways operates a 72 km (45 mi) Metro Manila–Laguna segment of its old 1,140 km (710 mi) network; Panay Railways had 154 km (96 mi) in Panay and Cebu. PNR will re-gauge its entire network to 1,435 mm (4 ft 8 1/2 in) standard gauge.
Sierra Leone	There are 84 kilometres of 3 ft 6 in (1,067 mm) gauge private railways in Sierra Leone.
South Africa	About 20,500 route-km. Gautrain (80 km) is 4 ft 8 1/2 in (1,435 mm) standard gauge and there were several limited 2 ft (610 mm) narrow gauge systems.
South Sudan	Isolated, 248 kilometers (154 mi)
Spain	The line from Cartagena to Los Blancos was originally 1,067 mm (3 ft 6 in), but was converted to 1,000 mm (3 ft 3 3/8 in) in 1976, at the same time as the line was extended to Los Nietos.
Sudan	Isolated, 4,725 kilometers (2,936 mi)
Sweden	Several during the 19th century, all closed or regauged.
Taiwan	1,097 km (682 mi) (Taiwan Railway)
Tanzania	Dar es Salaam to Zambia (TAZARA Railway only, rest of the network is 1,000 mm (3 ft 3 3/8 in) metre gauge.
Turkey	Chemin de Fer Moudania Brousse
United Kingdom	Main article: 3 ft 6 in gauge railways in the United Kingdom
United States	Main article: 3 ft 6 in gauge railroads in the United States
Venezuela	Great Venezuela Railway
Wales	Great Orme Tramway; Swansea Constitution Hill Incline Tramway
Zambia	Zambia Railways, Mulobezi Railway
Zimbabwe	National Railways of Zimbabwe

== See also ==
- Cape Government Railways
- Heritage railway
- List of track gauges
- List of speed records in rail transport#Conventional wheeled – Narrow gauge
