= Chillington Iron Works =

Tramway in the West Midlands

Coordinates: 52°35′03″N 2°06′35″W

The Chillington Iron Works opened in 1822. Foster, Rastrick and Company in Stourbridge played a role in equipping the works.

== Tramway ==
An extensive 2 ft 6 in (762 mm) gauge tramway connected the ironworks with the Birmingham canal at Chillington Wharf, but had disappeared by the turn of the century. Steam locomotives from John Smith Village Foundry at Coven, were purchased for use on the line.

== Chillington Wharf ==
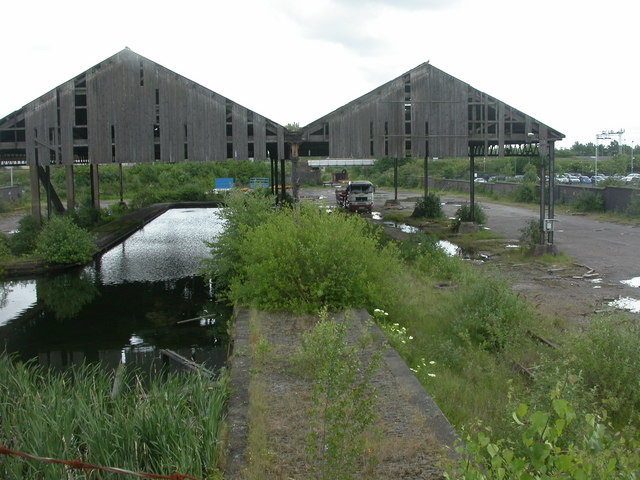
The wharf in 2009

Chillington Wharf was the railway interchange basin used by the company, which, despite its poor condition, is one of the best preserved of the many that were once on the Birmingham Canal Navigations. During the heyday of the iron works, the railway network would transport goods close to industrial estates but canals would make up the final leg of the journey, because the companies had already built canals and so building a railway as well was obsolete. At the basin, a crane would transfer goods between freight trains and canal boats.

=== History ===
The wharf was originally built around 1830 by the Chillington Iron Works, and the tramway ran between the works and the basin. Around 1848, the site was expanded to include a second interchange basin. In 1885, the property was sold off to the London and North Western Railway (LNWR) when the Iron Works went into receivership. The LNWR received parliamentary approval in 1898 to overhaul the site by replacing the two basins with a new one with two arms of the same length. The LNWR became part of the London, Midland and Scottish Railway (LMS) in 1923, and the LMS removed one of the arms.

Use of the wharf ended in 1963. The wharf was grade II listed in 1996 after a campaign by the Birmingham Canal Navigation Society, which covered the basin but not its crane. The society then attempted to restore the basin for heritage use in the late 1990s but the project was cancelled due to the cost. The railway line through the site is still active, and a nearby site is used by the Wolverhampton Steel Terminal for transferring goods between trains and lorries by crane, rather in the same fashion as the old interchange basin. The site is not open to the public.
