= Chillington Wharf =

Derelict cargo interchange in England

Coordinates: 52°34′48″N 2°06′41″W

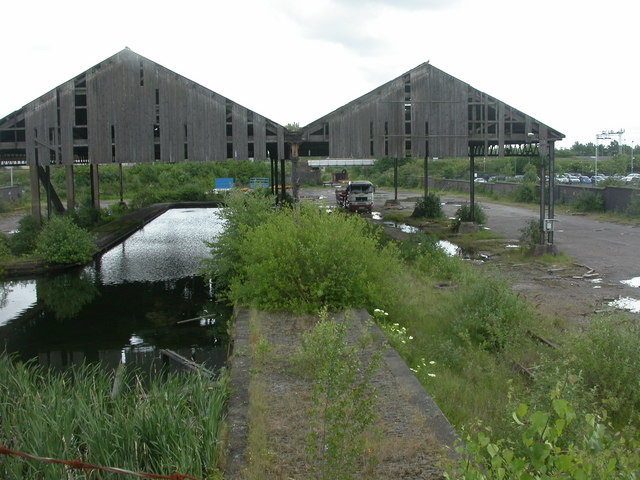
Rail/canal interchange off Bilston Road; Wolverhampton. One basin remains and railway tracks can be seen to the right. Built 1902, to allow goods to be moved from rail to canal and vice versa; abandoned for many years

Chillington Wharf is a now derelict intermodal cargo interchange to the east of the city of Wolverhampton, England. It was built by the Chillington Iron Company.

== History ==
The wharf was constructed by the company in the 19th century. It consisted of two arms off the Birmingham Canal and a Chillington Iron Company Tramway yard which linked to the company's foundries. The company went bust in 1885 and the wharf was quickly snapped up by the London and North Western Railway (LNWR).

The LNWR created a link from their line between Birmingham and Wolverhampton (today the Rugby-Birmingham-Stafford Line) which diverged to the opposite side of the track, descended a gradient and swept under the main line into the wharf. The wharf opened for full service in 1902.

There is also a Babcock & Wilcox 10-ton overhead crane in the wharf.

== Today ==
Over the years, the wharf has fallen into disuse and inevitable disrepair. At some point the second canal arm was removed and only one now remains, albeit heavily overgrown. The railway link still exists, and in fact the yard is still used for wagon overflow by DB Cargo UK for its adjacent Wolverhampton Steel Terminal. The link that the LNWR built also included a link to the Birmingham Snow Hill-Wolverhampton Low Level Line, which ran adjacent to the LNWR's main line. Although the track has mostly been taken up to the south, the trackbed remains in place as far as where the line crossed Bilston Road. The trackbed south of this point is now utilised by the West Midlands Metro.

The interchange basin and double canopy is a Grade II listed building.
