= Worcester Tramways Company =

Tramway operator in England

Operation
- Locale: Worcester
- Open: 23 February 1884
- Close: 31 October 1902
- Status: Closed

Infrastructure
- Track gauge: 3 ft (914 mm)
- Propulsion system: Horse

Statistics
- Route length: 3.5 miles (5.6 km)
Tramways Trust Company era: 1884–1885
- Track gauge: 3 ft (914 mm)
City of Worcester Tramways Company era: 1889–1894
- Track gauge: 3 ft (914 mm)
Worcester Tramways Company era: 1894–1902
- Track gauge: 3 ft (914 mm)

Worcester Tramways Company and its predecessors operated a horse-drawn tramway service in Worcester between 1884 and 1902.

== Tramways Trust Company ==
The Worcester Tramways Order 1881 authorised the Tramways Trust Company to build a 3 ft (914 mm) narrow gauge horse tramway. There was a depot at St Johns, Bull Ring and three branches on the 3.5 mile network:

- The Cross – St Johns
- City Centre – Foregate St – Barbourne – Ombersley Rd
- St Nicholas St – Shrub Hill station.

Although the order was granted in 1881 it took the promoters some time to raise the funds necessary. Construction started in mid 1883 with the contractor being Mr. T. D. Sheild of the City of London Contract Corporation. Six tramcars were ordered in August 1883 from the Falcon Engine and Car Works in Loughborough. They were knifeboard-seat double-deck cars seating 16 passengers inside and 18 outside. The cars were painted yellow and white, picked out with gold, bearing the arms of the city. Three routes were inspected by Major-General Charles Scrope Hutchinson on 23 January 1884 and services started on 18 February 1884. One of the six tramcars originally ordered operated between Worcester Shrub Hill railway station and The Cross, and the others worked a cross-town service.

The Tramways Trust Company went into liquidation on 12 December 1885.

Plans were approved by the Board of Trade in 1886 for extensions, but, presumably due to the financial state of the company, these were not constructed.

== City of Worcester Tramways Company ==
The City of Worcester Tramways Company purchased the Worcester tramway from the liquidator in 1889. Despite investment which included converting the double track in Broad Street between the Crown Inn and Falcon Inn to interlaced track with 4 feet 6 inches (1.37 m) clearances, this new company was unable to improve the financial position and the company was purchased by Pritchard Green and Company, consulting engineers of Birmingham on 13 August 1893.

== Worcester Tramways Ltd ==
The Worcester Tramways Ltd took over the assets on 27 February 1894. The new company appointed Richard Robert Fairburn as manager. Fairburn introduced horse-drawn omnibus services to outlying villages. The Shrub Hill line was suspended in 1896 but subsequently re-opened. By 1900 the company had seven double-deck and two single-deck tramcars, eight double-deck and three single-deck omnibuses. The 104 horses operated 3¼ miles of tramway and five bus routes of 18 miles in length.

Worcester Tramways Act 1901
- Act of Parliament
- Parliament of the United Kingdom
- Long title: An Act for empowering the Worcester Tramways Limited to construct new tramways in lieu of their existing tramways and to work the same by mechanical power and for other purposes.
- Citation: 1 Edw. 7. c. cxci
- Territorial extent: United Kingdom

Dates
- Royal assent: 9 August 1901
- Commencement: 9 August 1901 (Note: The Acts of Parliament (Commencement) Act 1793.)

Other legislation
- Amended by: Statute Law (Repeals) Act 1998

Status: Partially repealed

In 1898 British Electric Traction gained control of the company. Plans were put in place for modernisation and electrification of the system. The Worcester Tramways Act 1901 (1 Edw. 7. c. cxci) and the Worcester (Extension) Light Railways Order 1902 gave the British Electric Traction subsidiary company, Worcester Electric Traction Company, authority to upgrade, extend and electrically operate a 3 ft 6 in (1,067 mm) narrow gauge tramway.

On 31 October 1902 Worcester Electric Traction Company took over the Worcester Tramways Company, which was finally dissolved in 1906.

== Bibliography ==
Works cited

- Price, J.H.; Gillham, J.C. (1995). "The Worcester Tramways". The Tramway Review (161).
