= Parracombe (locomotive) =

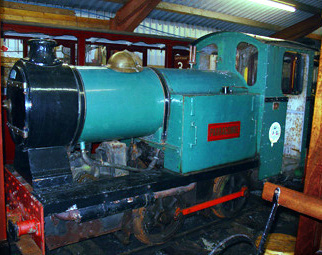
Parracombe, Lhen Coan Carriage Shed

Parracombe was the name of a steam outline Baguley diesel locomotive that currently resides on the Groudle Glen Railway on the Isle of Man in private ownership.

== History ==
Parracombe was built by Baguley (works No. 3232 of 1947) and once worked at Butlins Clacton Holiday Camp. During its time at Butlins, it featured on the closing credits of the situation comedy Hi-de-Hi!. After the Clacton Holiday Camp closed, it was purchased by the Lynton and Barnstaple Railway, and ran on the Lynbarn Railway at the Milky Way theme park in Clovelly. The locomotive arrived at the Groudle Glen Railway in 2007. It hauled a limited number of passenger services as part of an enthusiasts event in July 2007 and was then stored pending restoration.

Parracombe re-entered service for Christmas 2017 services, renamed "Maltby", after the creator of Groudle Glen Railway, Richard Maltby Broadbent.

A similar Baguley loco "Dreadnought" operates at Amerton Railway in Staffordshire, and another operates at the Old Kiln Light Railway in Surrey.
