= Worcester Electric Traction Company =

Tramway operator in England

Operation
- Locale: Worcester
- Open: 6 February 1904
- Close: 31 May 1928
- Status: Closed

Infrastructure
- Track gauge: 3 ft 6 in (1,067 mm)
- Propulsion system: Electric
- Depot: St John's

Statistics
- Route length: 5.86 miles (9.43 km)

The Worcester Electric Traction Company operated a tramway service in Worcester between 1904 and 1928.

== History ==
The Worcester Tramways Act 1901 authorised the electrification of the system and the conversion from 3ft gauge to 3ft 6in along with a number of extensions. Having had a financial interest since around 1899, once plans were agreed for the electrification of the Worcester Tramway system the British Electric Traction company completed the acquisition of the Worcester Tramways Company on 31 October 1902. The last horse drawn tramway service was on 28 June 1903 and during conversion the service maintained by horse buses. The horse tramcars were offered for sale as garden sheds for around £6.00 each.

The company brought in the Brush Electrical Engineering Company Ltd as the main contractor with Norman Brough as the resident engineer. The track was constructed to the wider gauge of 3 feet 6 inches (1,070 mm) by William Griffith using 94 lbs per yard rail. Reconstruction in 1903 involved closing several streets and was known locally as the Siege of Worcester.

The tramway was inspected by Colonel Von Donop from the Board of Trade and opened in four stages:

- Three routes, St John’s via The Cross to the Vine Inn, Barbourne, St Nicholas Street to Shrub Hill station, and St Nicholas Street to Astwood Cemetery, 6 February 1904
- High Street to London Road at Foxwell Street, 30 April 1904
- Bath Road route to Berwick Arms, 2 July 1904
- St John’s route extension along Malvern Road to 100 yds beyond the Brunswick Arms, 25 August 1906

== Fleet ==
There were 15 cars built by Brush Electrical Engineering Company of Loughborough for the initial services in a livery of holly green and cream. The cars were four-wheeled open top with seating for 22 inside and 28 outside. They were powered with two Dick Kerr 25B 28hp motors. The trams were also fitted with slipper brakes on account of the gradients on Rainbow Hill and London Road. Two of the cars originally intended for Worcester were diverted to Peterborough Tramways on account of an agricultural show in July 1904, and they remained there for a number of years in Worcester livery. Replacement cars were provided by Brush to Worcester.

Two further cars were ordered in October 1921 and delivered on 17 February 1922. They were constructed by the Birmingham and Midland Tramways and were given the numbers 16 and 17. On closure in 1928, these two cars were sold to the Cheltenham and District Light Railway and became their numbers 24 and 25 and continued in service until 1930.

== Notable people ==
=== General managers ===
The managers were provided with a house adjacent to the depot, at 12 St John’s. This was used until the appointment of C. H. Built in 1917 when it was rented out.

- Richard Robert Fairburn 1904 - 1908
- James Groves 1908 - 1915
- C. H. Built 1917 - 1928

== Closure ==
In 1928 Worcester Corporation purchased the undertaking and the system was closed on 31 May 1928. Services were replaced by omnibuses provided by the Birmingham and Midland Motor Omnibus Company Limited.

== Sources ==
Works cited

- Price, J.H.; Gillham, J.C. (1995a). "The Worcester Tramways". The Tramway Review. 21 (161).
- Price, J.H.; Gillham, J.C. (1995b). "The Worcester Tramways". The Tramway Review. 21 (162).
