= Lynbarn Railway =

Coordinates: 50.980°N 4.384°W

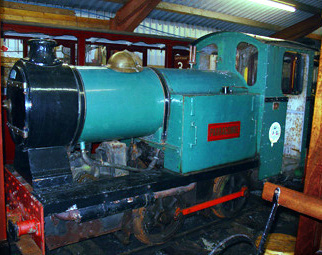
Former Lynbarn Railway motive power, Parracombe, at Lhen Coan Carriage Shed, Groudle Glen Railway

The 1 ft 11 1/2 in (597 mm) narrow gauge Lynbarn Railway opened in 1995 as a park ride at the Milky Way Adventure Park, a family-based theme park attraction near Clovelly in north Devon, England. It was built and operated by enthusiast volunteers working to revive the Lynton and Barnstaple Railway (L&B) – a nearby historical line running through Exmoor.

Built to the same rail gauge – 1 ft 11 1/2 in (597 mm) – as the L&B, but with a considerably smaller loading gauge, the ride made significant contributions to the finances, skills and expertise of the L&B and was substantially extended and improved during 2003/2004.

So they could concentrate on operating at Woody Bay the L&B sold their share in the Lynbarn operation to the owners of the Milky Way Adventure Park, who now operate the ride along with the other attractions.

The "Lynbarn" uses three coaches that were part of a lot bought by the L&B and formerly based at Thorpe Park in Surrey. A further four of these coaches were fully rebuilt, and carried passengers at the L&B (Woody Bay) between 2004 and 2013. The coaches were sold in May 2014 to the Statfold Barn Railway as they were surplus to requirements, following the introduction of original restored L&B carriages. There are also a number of service wagons, used for maintaining the track.

Motive power was provided by two steam outline diesel locomotives. One of these, Parracombe, was built by Baguley in 1947 for the line at Butlins, Clacton. A scene from that period featured in the closing sequences of a popular TV series Hi-de-Hi! (1979–1987). This loco was transferred to the Groudle Glen Railway in 2007.

== See also ==
- List of British Theme Parks
