= Tynemouth and District Electric Traction Company =

Tramway operator in England

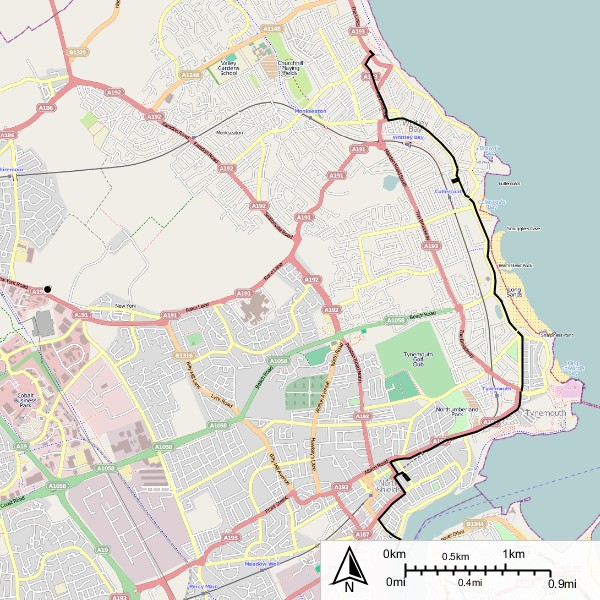
- Map of the route of the Tynemouth and District Electric Traction Company

Operation
- Locale: North Shields – Tynemouth –Whitley Bay
- Open: 1 March 1901
- Close: 4 August 1931
- Status: Closed

Infrastructure
- Track gauge: 3 ft 6 in (1,067 mm)
- Propulsion system: Electric

Statistics
- Route length: 4.23 miles (6.81 km)

The Tynemouth and District Electric Traction Company operated a tramway service in North Shields, Tynemouth and Whitley Bay between 1901 and 1931.

== History ==
The company was formed in 1899. It was the successor to the horse tramway started in 1883 by the Tynemouth and District Tramways Limited. This became the North Shields and District Tramways Company Limited in 1884, the North Shields and Tynemouth District Tramways Limited in 1890, and British Electric Traction Company in 1897.

The horse tramway was closed in 1900 for electrification. The reconstruction of the line cost £58,000 (equivalent to £6,200,000 in 2025) and eleven tramcars were purchased at a cost of £700 (equivalent to £74,000 in 2025) each. One and a half miles of additional track was laid giving three and three-quarter route miles.

The official inspection of the newly electrified line took place on 13 February 1901 when two double cars and a pilot car was run to convey the Board of Trade Inspector, the Mayor of Tynemouth (Mr. Jacob Dalglish), the Borough Surveyor (Mr. Smillie), with several alderman and councillors.

Electric services started on 1 March 1901. The new electric line ran from the New Quay, North Shields to terminate at the Victoria Hotel, Whitley. In 1904 the line was extended from Whitley Front Street to the bandstand on the Links.

Near New Quay there was a connection to the Tyneside Tramways and Tramroads Company.

Electric power was supplied by the new Tynemouth Corporation Power Station at Tanners Bank.

== Fleet ==
- 1-10 Electric Railway and Tramway Carriage Works, Preston 1901.
- 11 Bank car
- 12-18
- 19-21 three second hand cars from the Dudley, Stourbridge and District Electric Traction Company.
- 22-24 three second hand cars from the Burton and Ashby Light Railway when it closed in 1927.

== Closure ==
The system closed on 4 August 1931.
