= Tynemouth and District Tramways =

Tramway operator in England

Operation
- Locale: North Shields – Tynemouth
- Open: 1883
- Close: 1900
- Status: Closed

Infrastructure
- Track gauge: 3 ft (914 mm)
- Propulsion system: Horse then Steam

Statistics
- Route length: 2.58 miles (4.15 km)

The Tynemouth and District Tramways operated a 3 ft (914 mm) narrow gauge tramway service between North Shields and Tynemouth between 1883 and 1900.

== History ==
The company started services in 1883 with horse-drawn tramway services. The depot was in Suez Street, North Shields.

The company was taken over by North Shields and District Tramways Company in 1884. This company introduced steam traction with five steam locomotives.

This company was taken over by the North Shields and Tynemouth District Tramways in 1897.

== Closure ==
The company was taken over by British Electric Traction in 1897 and it was modernised and electrified and opened as the Tynemouth and District Electric Traction Company.
