= Aberdare Urban District Council Tramways =

Former tramway service operator

Operation
- Locale: Aberdare
- Open: 9 October 1913
- Close: 1 April 1935
- Status: Closed

Infrastructure
- Track gauge: 3 ft 6 in (1,067 mm)
- Propulsion system: Electric

Statistics
- Route length: 5.77 miles (9.29 km)

Aberdare Urban District Council Tramways operated a tramway service in Aberdare between 1913 and 1935. It was the only system in the United Kingdom which consisted of a tramway with feeder services run by trolleybuses from the start. The trolleybuses used the Austrian Cedes-Stoll system, and became increasingly difficult to maintain. Parts of the trolleybus network were converted to tramways in the early 1920s, and the rest stopped operating in 1925, when no trolleybuses were available for service. The tramway continued for another ten years, but was closed in 1934 and 1935 as a result of a downturn in the prosperity of Aberdare, due to collieries closing and the population dwindling. Motor buses took over the local services once the tramway had closed.

== History ==
The first attempt to build an electric tramway system in Aberdare occurred in 1899, when British Electric Traction (BET) applied for a light railway order to authorise the work. The British Electric Traction Company had been founded in 1896, and were involved in building and operating tramways across the United Kingdom. Light railway orders were part of the provision of the Light Railways Act 1896, and were designed to simplify the construction of railways. However, BET failed to obtain the order, and the scheme came to nothing. Aberdare Urban District Council then decided that they would apply for powers to construct a tramway themselves. The scheme was for 4 miles (6.4 km) of tramway, running from Trecynon to the north-west of the town, to Abercwmboi, to the south-east, where they hoped it could join up with a system being proposed by Mountain Ash Urban District Council. They suffered several setbacks, but finally obtained authorisation for 2.75 miles (4.43 km) miles of tramway in 1911. It included the northern section, but the southern section was cut back to terminate at Clarence Street in Aberaman.

In 1910, Aberdare UDC had also formulated plans for a trackless system to act as feeders for the tramway, and authorisation for it was granted by the same act of Parliament as for the tramway. Four routes were planned, three of which were hilly, and would have been unsuitable for trams, with an average gradient of 1 in 10. The routes were from Cwmdare to the northern tramway terminus as Abercynon, around 0.5 miles (0.8 km) long; a 1-mile (1.6 km) link from Abernant to Commercial Street in the centre of Aberdare; and two routes from the southern terminus at Aberaman, one to Cwmaman, which was 1.25 miles (2.0 km) long, and the other to Capooch, which was 0.75 miles (1.2 km) long. Aberdare UDC intended to open the two systems on the same date, and in this it was unique in the United Kingdom, as no other towns built an integrated tram and trolleybus network at the same time.

An opening ceremony was held on 9 October 1913, but although the trams started running on this date, trolleybus operation did not start until 15 January 1914, although the first trial run had taken place on 22 September 1913. For the opening, ten single-deck trams were purchased from Brush Electrical Engineering Company, which were numbered from 11 to 20. Eight single-deck trolleybuses with rear entrances, bodywork by Christopher Dodson and seating for 27 were also purchased. They were unusual in that they used the Cedes Stoll system for current collection, where a four-wheeled trolley ran along the top of the pair of overhead wires. They were powered by motors built into the rear wheels. Of the four routes, only that to Cwmaman had two sets of overhead wires, enabling the trolleybuses to pass one another when travelling in opposite directions. On the other three routes, when two vehicles met they swapped trolleys, before continuing with the trolley from the other vehicle.

A depot for the vehicles was built at Gadlys, capable of holding twelve trams and eight trolleybuses. Because there were no wires from the separate trolleybus routes to the depot, the cars were fitted with a boom to collect power from the overhead tram wires, and a slipper to complete the circuit through the tram tracks, enabling them to reach their starting points under their own power. This system was soon abandoned, the trolleybuses being towed to their starting points by tram each morning, and returned to the depot in the evening by the same method.

Four more trams were obtained from Brush in 1914. They had an upper deck with an open top, and were numbered 6 to 9. By this time, the trolleybuses were becoming increasingly difficult to maintain. The Cedes Stoll system was of Austrian manufacture, and spare parts were unobtainable with the onset of the First World War. The two routes southwards from Aberaman did not see any trolleybuses after 31 March 1919, and only four of the vehicles were operational. At that time, proposals for linking up the tram system to those of Rhondda and Pontypridd were voiced, but when the council invited tenders in 1920, they were for the conversion of the two trolleybus routes southwards from Aberaman into tramways. Work progressed slowly, and there is some doubt as to when they opened, as some sources state that the new lines were ready for inspection by the Ministry of Transport in December 1922, while others quote Spring 1922 for the line to Abercwmboi and Autumn 1922 for the line to Cwmaman. Twelve additional double-deck tramcars were purchased to work the extended service. Meanwhile, the number of active trolleybuses continued to dwindle, with three available in 1921 and two in 1924. A local newspaper reported on 8 August 1925 that the final Cedes Stoll trolley vehicle had broken down, and that the council were considering inspecting some Straker-Clough vehicles which had been offered for sale by the Keighley system. Keighley had been another user of the Cedes-Stoll system, but in 1924 had begun the process of changing to a more conventional method of current collection. In September it was reported that the manager of the Aberdare system, Mr W T Hilder, had requested a report on whether to buy the second-hand vehicles, or to approach manufacturers directly, but nothing came of either proposal.

The track was mostly single, with passing loops. It ran from the terminus at the bottom of Cwmdare Hill, to both Cwmaman and Abercwmboi. There was a double track section along Canon Street to Regent Street in Aberaman.

=== Closure ===
Aberdare suffered a downturn in its prosperity in the 1930s. Local collieries closed, and there was a steady decline in the population. This resulted in receipts falling, and in 1934 the council took the decision to close the tramway and replace it with motor buses. The northern route to Trecynon closed on 30 September 1934, and the southern routes closed on 1 April 1935, when the last tram to run was number 7. Aberdare was the only place in the United Kingdom where trolleybus routes were replaced by trams.

== Fleet ==
Aberdare owned a total of 26 tramcars, bought in three batches.

Car numbers	Type	Year built	Builder
11-20	single deck	1913	Brush
6-9	Open top	1914	Brush
1-5,10,21-26	double deck	1922	Brush

The council also owned eight trolleybuses, made by Cedes-Stoll, all bought as a single batch.

Car numbers	Type	In service	Withdrawn	Chassis	Electrical equipment	Bodywork
unknown	single deck rear entrance	1913	1925	Cedes-Stoll		Christopher Dodson B27R

Bus bodywork designations: key
Prefixes

U	Wartime utility bodywork
B	Bus body single deck
C	Coach body single deck
D	Dual purpose single deck
H	Highbridge body, central upper gangway
L	Lowbridge body, offset sunken upper gangway

Numbers

n	Single deck or total seating
x / y	Upper deck followed by lower deck seating

Suffixes

C	Centre entrance
F	Front entrance
R	Rear entrance
D	Dual entrance

== Bibliography ==
- Joyce, J; King, J S; Newman, G (1986). British Trolleybus Systems. Ian Allan. ISBN 978-0-7110-1647-7.
- Klapper, Charles (1974). The Golden Age of Tramways. David & Charles. ISBN 978-0-7153-6458-1.
- Turner, Keith (1996). The Directory of British Tramways. Patrick Stephens. ISBN 978-1-85260-549-0.
