= Llanelly Tramways =

Tramway operator in Wales

Operation
- Locale: Llanelli
- Open: 28 September 1882
- Close: April 1908
- Status: Closed

Infrastructure
- Track gauge: 3 ft (914 mm)
- Propulsion system: Horse
- Depot: Robinson Street

Statistics
- Route length: 0.97 miles (1.56 km)

Llanelly Tramways operated a tramway service in Llanelli between 1882 and 1908.

== History ==
The Llanelly Tramways Order 1880 authorised the construction of this short horse-drawn tramway in Llanelli. The line ran from Llanelli railway station to Woodend.

== Closure ==
The horse-drawn tramways operated by the Llanelly Tramways were taken over by the Llanelly and District Electric Tramways in 1905 for £6,000.
