= Pwllheli Corporation Tramways =

Tramway operator in Wales

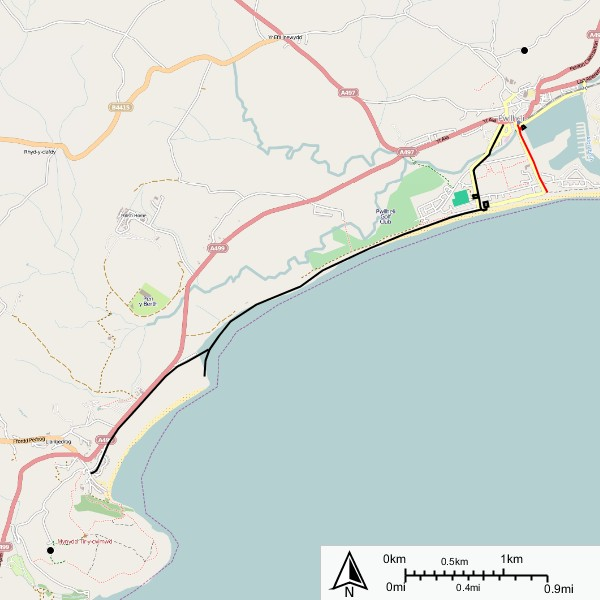
- Map of the Pwllheli Corporation Tramways (red line) and Pwllheli and Llanbedrog Tramways (black line)

Operation
- Locale: Pwllheli
- Open: 24 July 1899
- Close: September 1919
- Status: Closed

Infrastructure
- Track gauge: 2 ft 6 in (762 mm)
- Propulsion system: Horse

Statistics
- Route length: 0.51 miles (0.82 km)

Pwllheli Corporation Tramways operated a short horse-drawn tramway service in Pwllheli, Gwynedd, Wales. It had between 1899 and 1919.

== History ==
The short horse-drawn tramway service from Pwllheli railway station to Victoria Parade operated a summer service. It opened on 24 July 1899 when over 1,000 tickets were purchased. The tramway was built by the workmen of the corporation and consisted of a single line with a passing loop at the centre. It was built to a gauge of 2 ft 6in. The corporation provided open and covered cars. The open one had reversible seats for 24 passengers, and the closed one could accommodate 16 passengers. The fare was 1d. (equivalent to £0.46 in 2025), with special workmen's fares of 1/2 d.

Proposals were put forward for a connection to the Pwllheli and Llanbedrog Tramway, but these were never advanced, presumably, one of the major issues was the difference in track gauge.

== Closure ==
The service ceased after the summer season in 1919. It was dismantled shortly afterward.
