= Crickheath Tramway =

Former industrial railroad

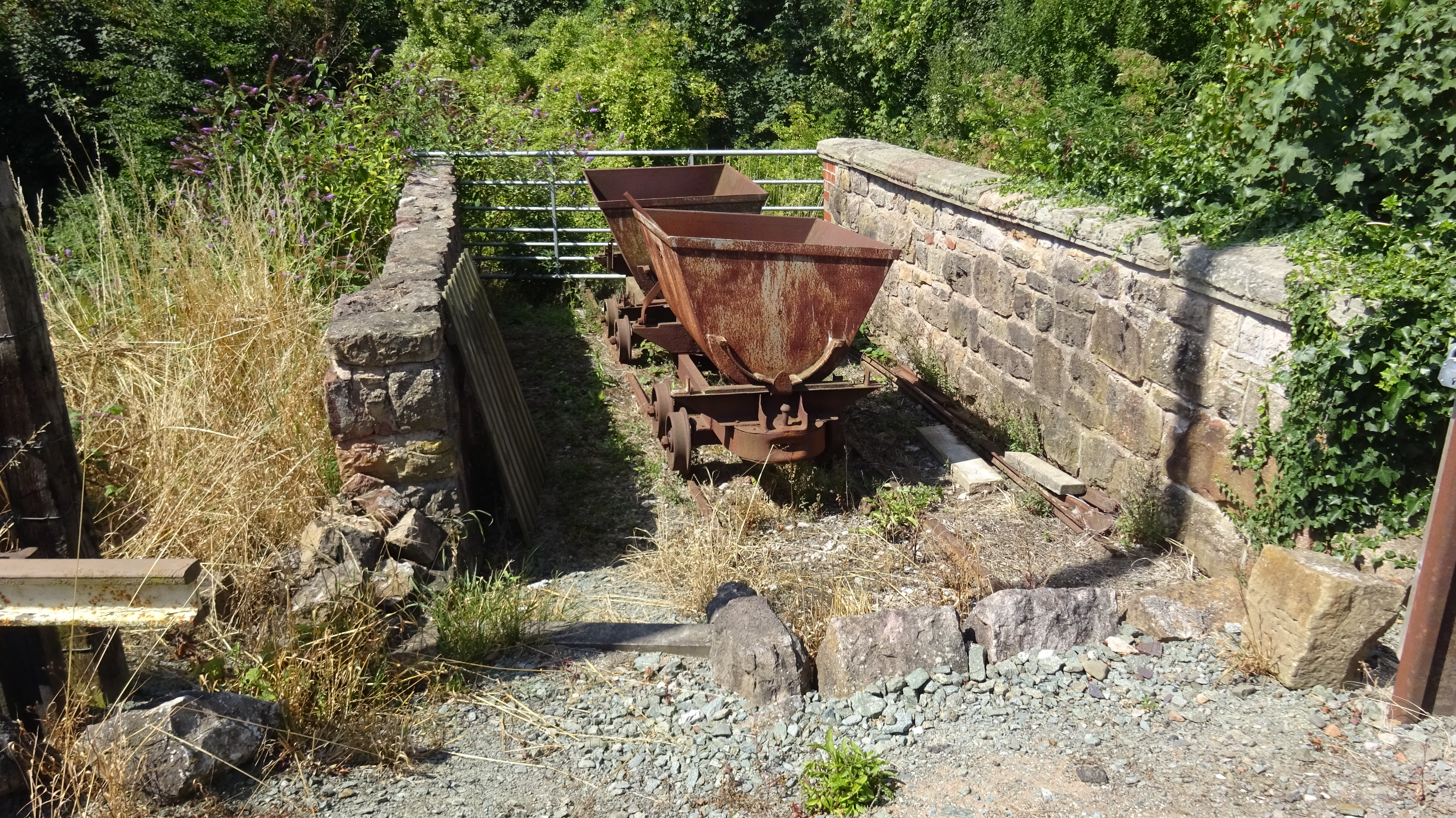
Crickheath Tramway and bridge at Llynclys

The Crickheath Tramway was a 1 1/2-mile (2.4 km) long, 2 ft 6 in (762 mm) narrow gauge industrial railway connecting the Porth-y-waen lime quarries near Llanymynech to the Crickheath Wharf (near Pant, Shropshire) on the Ellesmere Canal's Llanymynech branch. It opened in the 1820s and closed in 1913.

== Sources ==
- Baughan, Peter E. (1980). A Regional History of the Railways of Great Britain: Volume 11 North and Mid Wales (1st ed.). Newton Abbot: David & Charles. ISBN 0-7153-7850-3. OCLC 6823219.
- Baughan, Peter E. (1991). A Regional History of the Railways of Great Britain: Volume 11 North and Mid Wales (2nd ed.). Nairn: David St John Thomas. ISBN 0-9465-3759-3. OCLC 26361284.
