= The Milky Way (amusement park) =

Amusement park in North Devon, England

Coordinates: 50.9804°N 4.3840°W

The Milky Way Adventure Park (Downland Farm) is an amusement park in North Devon. It was named as Devon's Large Attraction of the Year by Visit Devon in 2023/24 and as one of the UK's best amusement parks by Trip Advisor every year since 2015 in their Travellers Choice Awards. The Milky Way park has over 110,000 sq ft of indoor and outdoor activities.

The Milky Way park has roller coasters, adventure rides, indoor dodgems, bouncing pillows, exhibition of Sci-Fi memorabilia (including Star Wars and Doctor Who costumes), a mini-train, birds of prey displays, archery, and huge indoor soft-play areas for all ages. It also runs a daily programme of shows, with some featuring Merlin from Britain's Got Talent.

Its soft-play centre, Little Stars, opened in 2014. It is designed specifically for children aged 0–6 and has areas set aside exclusively for those aged 0–3 and 0-6, including a sensory room for babies.

== History ==
On 1 April 1984, changes to European Union milk quotas resulted in the Stanburys' dairy farm and cattle dealing business collapsing almost overnight. Trevor and Christine Stanbury made the decision to diversify, and opened the farm to the public three months later on the 1st of July. Over the years, the family have transformed the farm into an all weather adventure park with the addition of various attractions, rides and shows.

In 2007, Trevor Stanbury was awarded a MBE for his services to tourism in southwest England. In 2009, he said he was keen to promote businesses in the area as he felt the most qualified of workers in Devon tended to move away.

In 2015, the park opened The Old Barn, a DIY wedding venue in a converted 17th century barn located on the edge of the site. In 2016, the park was listed by Tripadvisor as one of the ten best amusement parks in Britain.

== Attractions ==
The park organises events all year round. These include an annual Santa's Grotto. In 2015, the theme park started offering weddings in the ground, complete with rides on dodgems.

The Lynbarn Railway is a 1 ft 11 1/2 in (597 mm) narrow-gauge railway inside the park's grounds. It is a renovation of the old Lynton and Barnstaple Railway and uses coaches that were previously used in Thorpe Park. The park also has the cosmic typhoon roller coaster, cosmic caterpillar roller coaster and Ziggy's Blast Quest, a unique mix of a dark ride and rollercoaster.
