= Kirkcaldy Corporation Tramways =

Tramway operator in Scotland

Operation
- Locale: Kirkcaldy
- Open: 28 Feb 1903
- Close: 15 May 1931
- Status: Closed

Infrastructure
- Track gauge: 3 ft 6 in (1,067 mm)
- Propulsion system: Electric
- Depots: Oswald Road, Gallatown

Statistics
- Route length: 6.11 miles (9.83 km)

Kirkcaldy Corporation Tramways operated a tramway service in Kirkcaldy between 1903 and 1931.

== History ==
Services started on 28 February 1903. From 25 August 1906 through services were operated by the Wemyss and District Tramways Company on their route to Leven, Fife.

The power station was commissioned by the local authority and located in Victoria Road, Kirkcaldy. It was specially built to power the tramway. Construction began in 1899 to designs by local architect William Williamson, with the contractor McLaughlan of Larbert. Three Stirling boilers with five steam engines by Browett, Lindley & Co of Patricroft, drove alternators from Lawrence Scott and Electromotors of Norwich. The first power was produced in December 1902.

The Kirkcaldy Tramway had two main routes, a lower one extending into Dysart, and the upper one connecting with the Wemyss and District Tramways Company line. Both routes were linked by connections on Whytescauseway and St Clair Street.

From May 1906 to May 1907 it was reported that the tramway receipts increased £1,200 compared with the previous year, while receipts for Wemyss cars passing over the Kirkcaldy lines amounted to £1,000. Kirkcaldy cars carried 4.5 million passengers (an increase of 750,000 over the previous year), and the Wemyss cars over the Kirkcaldy system were carrying 270,000 passengers.

Despite a report from Alexander Kennedy and Sydney Donkin which recommended upgrading the system, the corporation failed to act, and system reliability was affected. From 1928, a bus service provided direct competition with the tram service.

== Closure ==
Services were closed on 15 May 1931. Some of the tramcars remained in service with the Wemyss and District Tramways Company until this closed in 1932.
