= Wolverhampton Steel Terminal =

Intermodal depot in Wolverhampton, England

Coordinates: 52°34′54″N 2°06′36″W

Wolverhampton Steel Terminal is a small intermodal depot in the city of Wolverhampton, England. The depot is served by a spur of the Rugby-Birmingham-Stafford Line – the mainline through the West Midlands. It can also be accessed by road, which makes it a useful point for transferring steel between road and rail transport.

The terminal is run by rail freight company DBS(I)

== Location ==
The depot is located to the east of the city centre in a mainly industrial area.

In rail terms, the depot is situated south of Wolverhampton railway station, and to the north of Coseley railway station. Apart from Wolverhampton South Junction to Walsall, it is the only divergence from the mainline between the two stations. It is only accessible from the Birmingham side. Trains running to the terminal from the north would theoretically need to stop and reverse onto the spur, but in practice would almost certainly divert via Bescot and come back onto the line through a series of junctions near Birmingham.

The depot is built adjacent to the trackbed of the Birmingham Snow Hill-Wolverhampton Low Level Line, which closed in 1972, and on the site of the former Walsall Street goods depot of the Great Western Railway. It was opened as a steel terminal in 1966.

== Layout ==
The central point of the depot is the rail lines, which are embedded in the tarmac – similar to a tramway. Road transport enters the depot from a road and can park next to waiting railway wagons. Forklift Trucks and a single railway shunter deal with logistics. The yard benefits from a number of sidings and headshunts, including a number of tracks that run beneath an overbridge carrying the mainline to Chillington Wharf, an old interchange that allowed transfer between rail and barge back in the days of the industrial canal system in the Midlands. The tracks to the wharf have been out of use for several years.

== Usage ==
The usage of the depot has decreased in recent years, following the more regular usage of Round Oak Steel Terminal, which is a favourable destination for steel trains because of the lack of need to route through the extremely congested Birmingham area. However, several steel trains from Llanwern and Margam, hauled by Class 60s or Class 66s, find their way there. From the depot, lorries haul the steel to customers in the West Midlands.
