= Brighton and Shoreham Tramways =

Defunct tram operator in England

Operation
- Locale: Shoreham-by-Sea
- Open: 3 July 1884
- Close: 6 June 1913
- Status: Closed

Infrastructure
- Track gauge: 3 ft 6 in (1,067 mm)
- Propulsion system: Steam then horse

Statistics
- Route length: 4.53 miles (7.29 km)

The Brighton and Shoreham Tramway operated a tramway service in Shoreham between 1884 and 1913.

== History ==
The Brighton and Shoreham Tramway ran from a terminus in Southdown Road, Shoreham to Westbourne Villas in Hove, on the former boundary between Hove and Portslade. It never penetrated Hove, although a connecting horse-drawn omnibus (route 112, operated by the Brighton and Preston United Omnibus Company) was available from the Westbourne Villas terminus.

Construction started in 1883 and route was opened throughout on 3 July 1884, initially with steam-driven trams. After this proved unsuccessful, other methods of propulsion were tried (including, in 1887, an early battery-powered locomotive). In 1893 these were abandoned in favour of horses.

== Closure ==
The British Electric Traction company took over the operations in 1898, but was unable to agree with any of the local authorities on a strategy for electrification. The tramway closed in June 1913.
