= Wemyss and District Tramways Company =

Tram operator in Fife, Scotland, 1906–1932

Wemyss and District Tramways
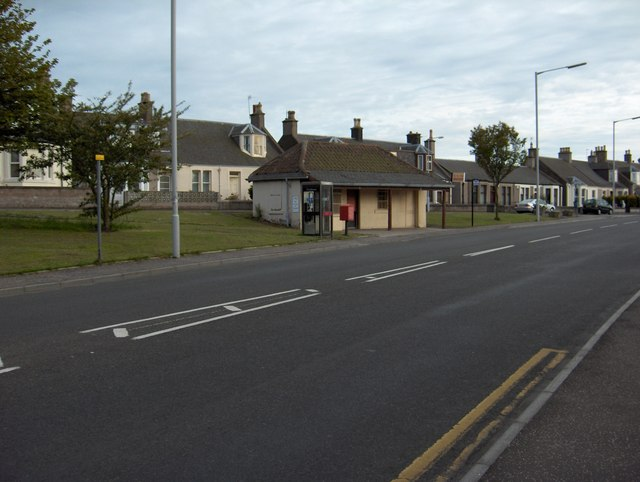
- The "Car Shed" East Wemyss, a former tram stop.

Operation
- Locale: Leven, Kirkcaldy
- Open: 25 August 1906
- Close: 30 January 1932
- Status: Closed

Infrastructure
- Track gauge: 3 ft 6 in (1,067 mm)
- Propulsion system: Electric
- Depots: Aberhill, Methil, Fife

Statistics
- Route length: 7.45 miles (11.99 km)

Wemyss and District Tramways operated a tramway service between Leven and Kirkcaldy between 1906 and 1932.

== History ==
The Wemyss Tramways Order 1905 authorised the construction of this tramway. It was financed by the Wemyss Coal Company, owned by Randolph Wemyss.

On 8 August 1906 a tram made a trial run from the shed at Aberhill, Methil to the power station at Denbeath, which attracted a large crowd. The power station contained two engines of 250 h.p. each. Services started on 25 August 1906, and it had running powers to the Kirkcaldy Corporation Tramways system.

The tramway company were granted permission to operate a limited service on Sundays, but by 1907 it was reported that services started at 7.40am and ran continually through the day and this was objected to by those in favour of the Sabbath Observance in relation to Sunday working by tramway employees and it was reported that drunkenness was a problem at the tramway termini

The mainline of the tramway joined Leven, Methil, Buckhaven, East Wemyss, West Wemyss, Coaltown of Wemyss, Dysart and Kirkcaldy.

The company was acquired by Balfour Beatty in 1922.

== Fleet ==
- 1-13 Brush Electrical Engineering Company 1906
- 14-17 Milnes Voss 1907
- 18-19 Brush Electrical Engineering Company 1925
- 20-21 Brush Electrical Engineering Company 1928 (second hand from the Potteries Electric Traction Company)
- 22-29 ex Kirkcaldy Corporation Tramways

== Closure ==
Services were closed on 30 January 1932.
