= Silkstone Waggonway =

Wagonway in South Yorkshire, England

Overview
- Headquarters: Silkstone
- Locale: England
- Dates of operation: 1809–c. 1870
- Successor: Abandoned

Technical
- Track gauge: 3 ft 6 in (1,067 mm)
- Length: 2.5 miles (4 km)

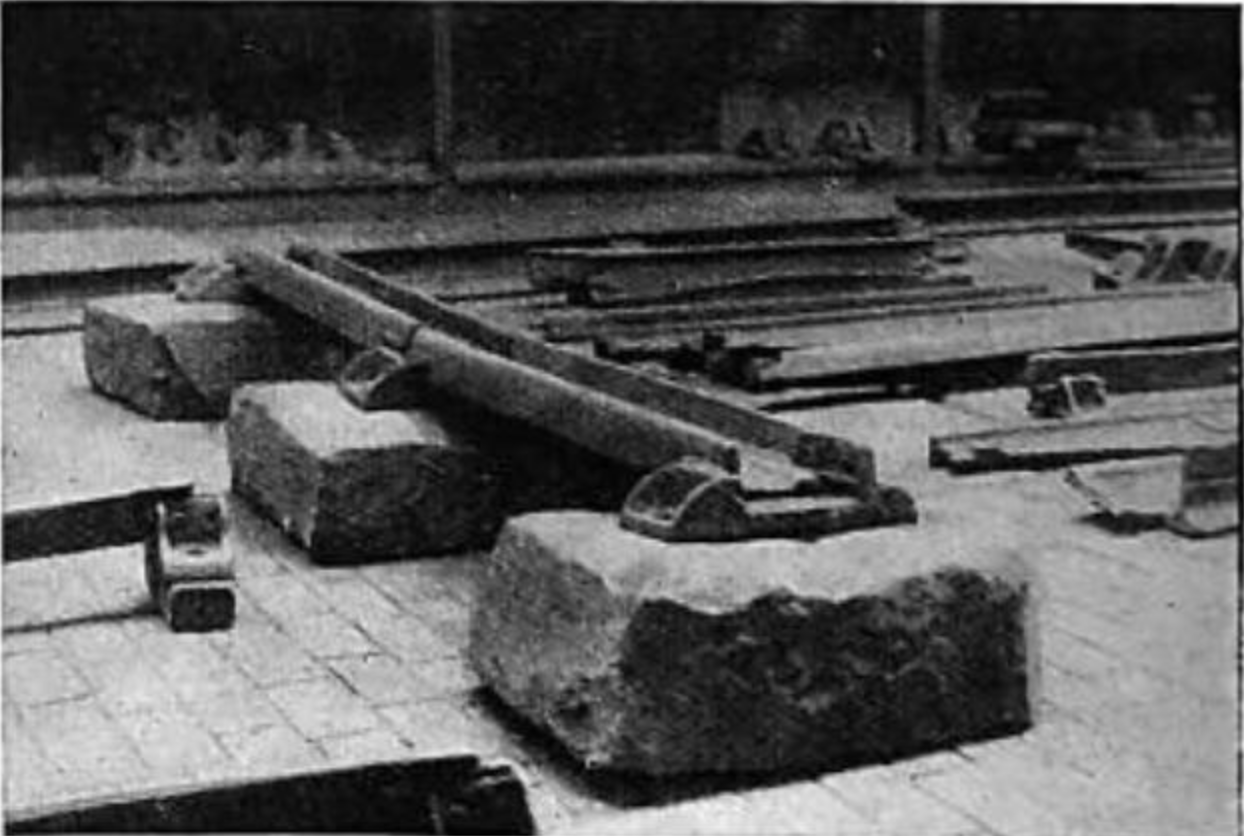
Trackwork from the waggonway on display at the LNER museum at York in 1927

The Silkstone Waggonway was a narrow-gauge industrial wagonway serving the Barnsley Canal, in England, at Silkstone in South Yorkshire.

== History ==
=== The Barnsley Canal ===
The Barnsley Canal was built in the 1790s to carry coal from the mines near Barnsley to the Aire and Calder Navigation near Wakefield.

In 1808, the canal company's Annual General Meeting approved a plan to build a waggonway, and they applied to Parliament for an Act authorising the construction of a horse-drawn railway from Silkstone Cross to the canal's southern terminus at Barnby Basin. The Act was granted.

=== Construction ===
The canal company purchased the trackbed of the earlier Low Moor Waggonway. Construction of the new waggonway proceeded quickly and it opened in 1809. The success of the waggonway as a feeder to the canal prompted the construction of furnaces at Low Mill, and the opening of the Waterloo Colliery. In 1812, the Norcroft Colliery was connected to the waggonway.

=== Extension ===
In the 1830s, an extension of the waggonway to Silkstone Common was built. This used an incline powered by a steam engine and a self-acting incline to connected to Huskar Pit.

=== Closure ===
In June 1847, the canal company entered into an agreement to sell the waggonway to the Manchester, Sheffield and Lincolnshire Railway. However, this transaction was never completed. Coal traffic along the waggonway peaked in 1851 at 33,621 tons. That year, however, was the first full year of operation of the Silkstone Coal Branch Railway, which quickly took traffic away from the waggonway. By 1856, only 22,726 tons of coal was carried. By 1864, ownership of the waggonway had transferred to the Aire and Calder Navigation and in 1866 the waggonway carried just 3,246 tons of coal and in 1870, no coal was carried at all.

In August 1872, it was reported that "the rails have been pulled up and sold".

== Route ==
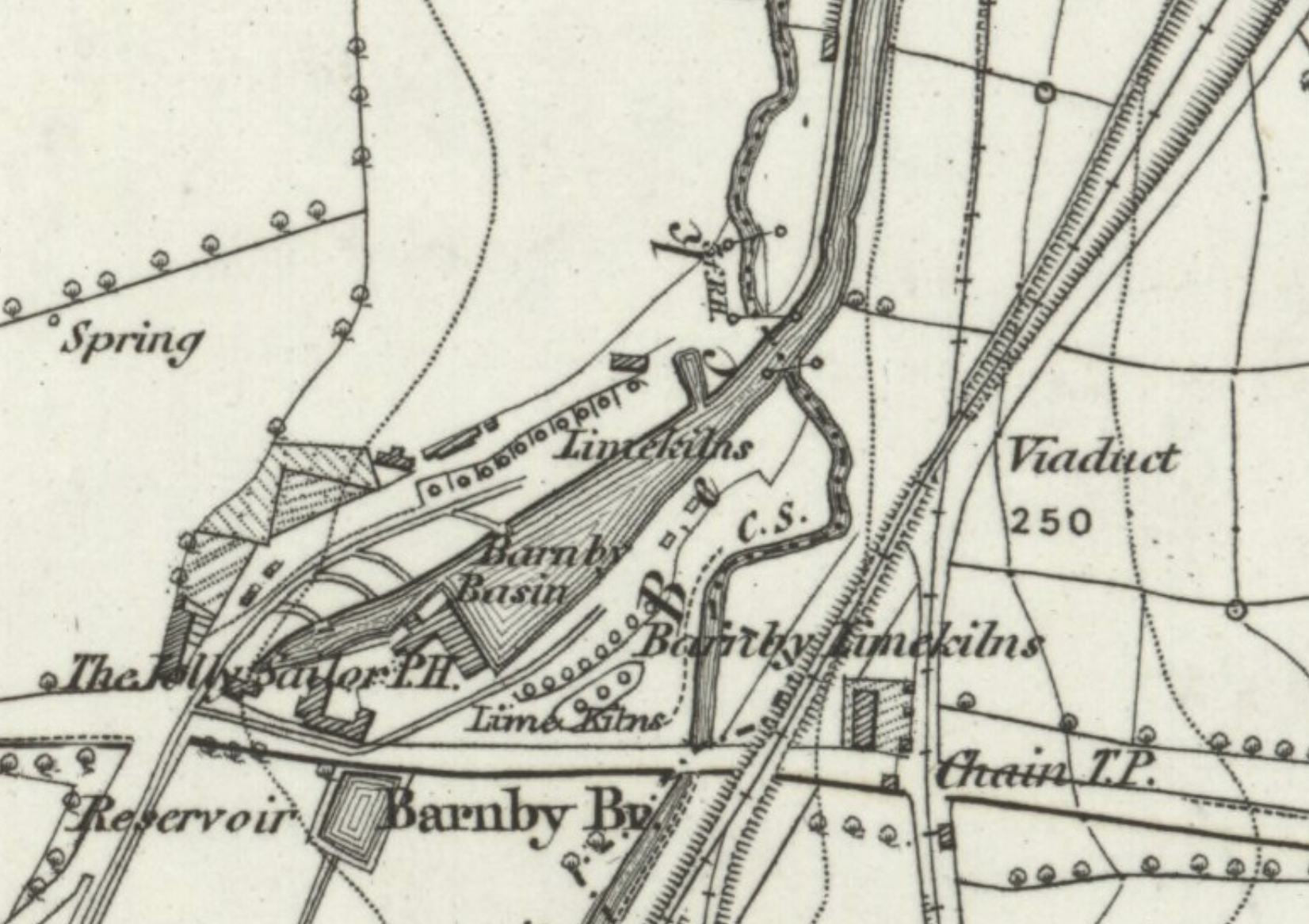
Barnby Basin in 1850, showing the Silkstone Waggonway on the left

The waggonway ran 2 1/2 miles (4.0 km) from Silkstone Cross to Barnby Basin. The lower section, between the Basin and Barnby Furnace, followed the route of the Low Moor Wagonway. From there it passed by Norcroft Bridge, at the north end of Silkstone.

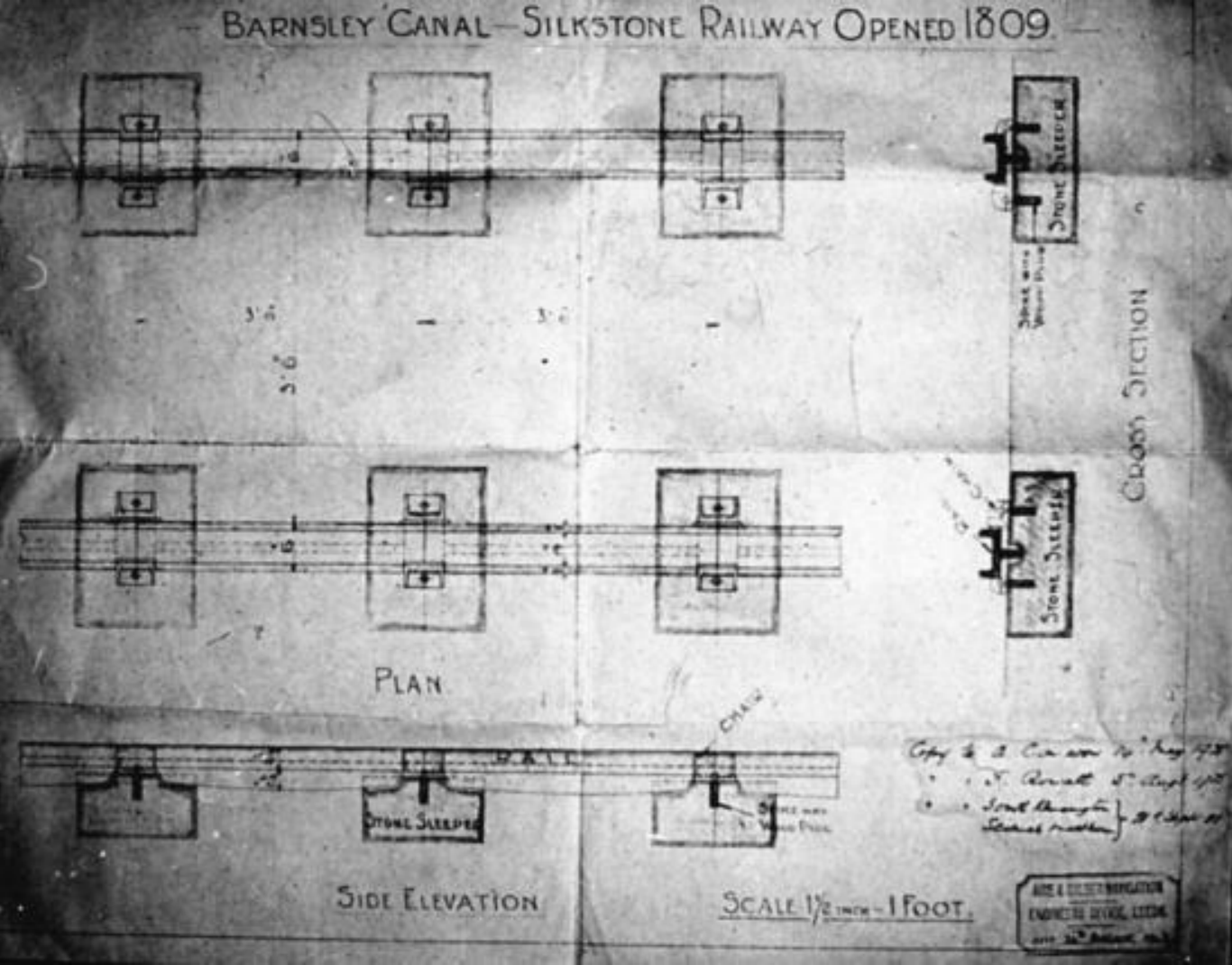
Sketch of the U-shaped track used in the Silkstone Waggonway, 1809

It was built with stone block sleepers, probably supplied from local quarries owned by Walter Spencer Stanhope. Cast iron, L-shaped rails were laid on the sleepers. Rough stones were packed around the sleepers to hold them in place, with a layer of ash covering them to make a suitable surface for the horses to walk on. Where the waggonway crossed public roads, unusual U-shaped rails were used.
