= Swansea Constitution Hill Incline Tramway =

Funicular tramway in Swansea, Wales

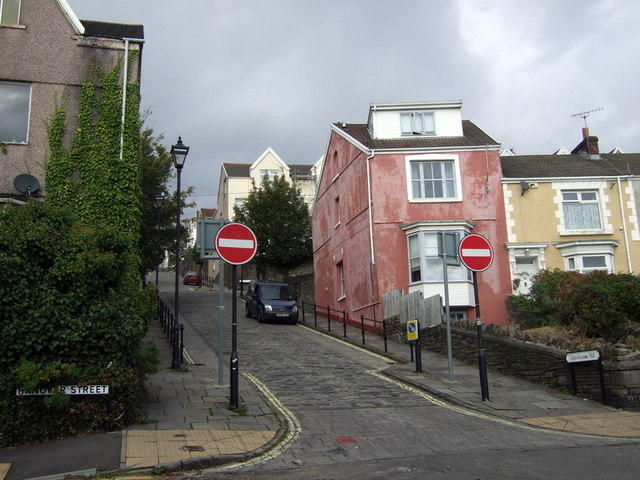
- Junction of Hanover Street and Constitution Hill, the site of the Cable Tramway

Operation
- Locale: Swansea
- Open: 27 August 1898
- Close: 5 October 1901
- Status: Closed

Infrastructure
- Track gauge: 3 ft 6 in (1,067 mm) (Note: This is not officially confirmed, but Price records that measurement of the pattern of granite setts would align with this figure.)
- Propulsion system: Cable

Statistics
- Route length: 0.175 miles (0.282 km)

The Swansea Constitution Hill Incline Tramway operated a cable funicular tramway service on Constitution Hill in Swansea between 1898 and 1901.

== History ==
The tramway was authorised by the Swansea (Constitution Hill) Tramway Order 1896. The Swansea Constitution Hill Incline Tramway Company developed this tramway with consulting engineer George Croydon Marks, 1st Baron Marks. It was built by George Webb and Company. It operated along Constitution Hill between the lower terminus at St. George Street which is now Hannover Street and the upper terminus at Terrace Road. There was an average gradient of 1 in 5 with a maximum of 1 in 3.5. The total elevation was 185 feet (56 m).

Two counterbalanced cars built by the Brush Electrical Engineering Company were fixed to the steel cable, guided by pulleys in a conduit. At the top of the hill the winding house contained two Tangye gas engines.

The line was first inspected by the Board of Trade, represented by Lieutenant-Colonel H A Yorke, on 26 April 1897, with a view to starting service in August of the same year. It failed the inspection on a number of safety issues:

- The friction between the upper driving pulley and the cable was insufficient to move the cars when the cars were unbalanced, i.e. the upper car was empty and the lower car was fully loaded. If the situation was reversed and the upper car was fully loaded, the cable slipped round the wheel so that the speed of the cars could not be controlled by braking the pulley.
- The cars brakes themselves were insufficient to stop and/or hold the car in the event of a cable break. Each of the two cars were provided with a wheel brake that acted on all four wheels, and two grip brakes (one for each end) that acted on the central cable conduit slot. However, they were actuated manually (the wheel brake by a lever, the grip brake by a handwheel and chain in a manner similar to conventional tramcar brakes). The latter was too slow to apply in the event of a car runaway, and the former was found to be insufficient to hold the car when the rails were slippery.
- The layout of the line was found to be dangerous. Above and below the passing loop, the cars worked on a single track. They were guided into the passing loop by sprung-operated points, such that the car would always take the same side of the passing loop. This was seemingly in contravention of the 1896 order for the line's construction, which specified that the cars operate on separate tracks, interlaced above and below the passing loop. The Board of Trade felt that

"...any ignorant or mischievous person or child could push the switches over into the wrong position in the face on an approaching car, and might then cause an accident."

In addition to this, the junction of the slots above and below the passing loop created a hole in the road surface which Yorke considered to be a hazard, particularly as children could get their feet caught and could be run over by an approaching car.

Under the terms of the building contract the company was allowed to claim from the building contractors the cost of any improvements or rectifications if the line was found to be unsatisfactory; this they did. It is unclear what changes may have taken place, particularly to the track layout, as while the Board of Trade raised serious issues of the single-track layout there is no record of it having been altered to interlaced track. However, some kind of new brake referred to as a "Scotch brake" was fitted to the cars.

It finally opened for service on 27 August 1898 but was closed on the same day when a problem was discovered in the clutch mechanism. It reopened around 1 September, and over the next 14 months averaged only around 500 passengers a day (200,000 in total). At least five people were needed to run the service at any time - a driver and guard on each car, and the engineer controlling the winding mechanism - and with a 1d fare, the passenger receipts had little prospect of ever covering even the wage costs.

== Closure ==
The tramway company was closely linked to a housing development at the top of the hill in Mount Pleasant, and decided to keep running the line until all the houses were sold. On 3 October 1901 the following statement appeared in the Evening Express:

It is stated to be the decision of the directors of the Swansea Cliff Railway up Constitution-hill to discontinue the service after this week, the line failing to be renumerative. An offer of the line has been made to the Swansea Corporation

It closed for traffic on 5 October 1901. The offer of the line to the Swansea Corporation was declined and the line was sold for scrap instead. The cars, machinery and rails were purchased for scrap by a Mr. Lowndes. (Note: Price states that the scrap buyer was a local resident, Thomas Saunders.)

The winding house building remained, derelict, in 1977. However, by 1980 it had been demolished by the City Engineer's Department as a danger to passers-by.
