= Cricklewood (disambiguation) =

Articles on Cricklewood include:

- Cricklewood, a district of North London
- Cricklewood (ward), electoral ward in North London
- Cricklewood Aerodrome, closed 1929
- Cricklewood Baptist Church, London
- Cricklewood Green, music album
- Cricklewood (New Zealand)
- Cricklewood Pumping Station, London
- Cricklewood railway station, London
