= Kempton Park, Surrey =

Park in Surrey, England

Coordinates: 51.418°N 0.405°W

Kempton Park, England formerly an expanded manor known as Kempton, Kenton (Note: Also in Middlesex, lay a hamlet known as the district or neighbourhood of Kenton, London) and other forms, today refers to the land owned by (estate in property of) the Jockey Club: Kempton Park nature reserve and Kempton Park Racecourse in the Spelthorne district of Surrey. Today's landholding was the heart of, throughout the Medieval period, a private parkland – and its location along with its being a royal manor rather than ecclesiastic, or high-nobility manor led to some occasional residence by Henry III and three centuries later hunting among a much larger chase by Henry VIII and his short-reigned son, Edward VI.

Kempton appears on the Middlesex Domesday Map as Chenetone a soon-after variant of which was Chennestone (the "k" sound rendered with "ch" and n's proceeded with an "e" due to the early Middle English orthography used by those scribes) later written, alongside data proving a period of regal use, as Kenyngton. The period of the last's writing was a source of ambiguity as it coincided with common forms of writing Kennington in Surrey. A wooded demesne at heart — the first Kempton Park was inclosed by royal licence in 1246. Its farmed-out outland smallholdings were for much of its history a considerably smaller manor than that of Sunbury, in which parish the whole estate is. Most of the ward of Sunbury East was in medieval times part of Kempton, as was the land of the Stain Hill Reservoirs and Kempton Park Reservoirs. No trace can be found of the chief tenant enjoying more than permissive, informal rights such as his tenants sharing in pasture on the common in the north of the parish of Sunbury, in which parish the manor lay.

== Park of the manor ==
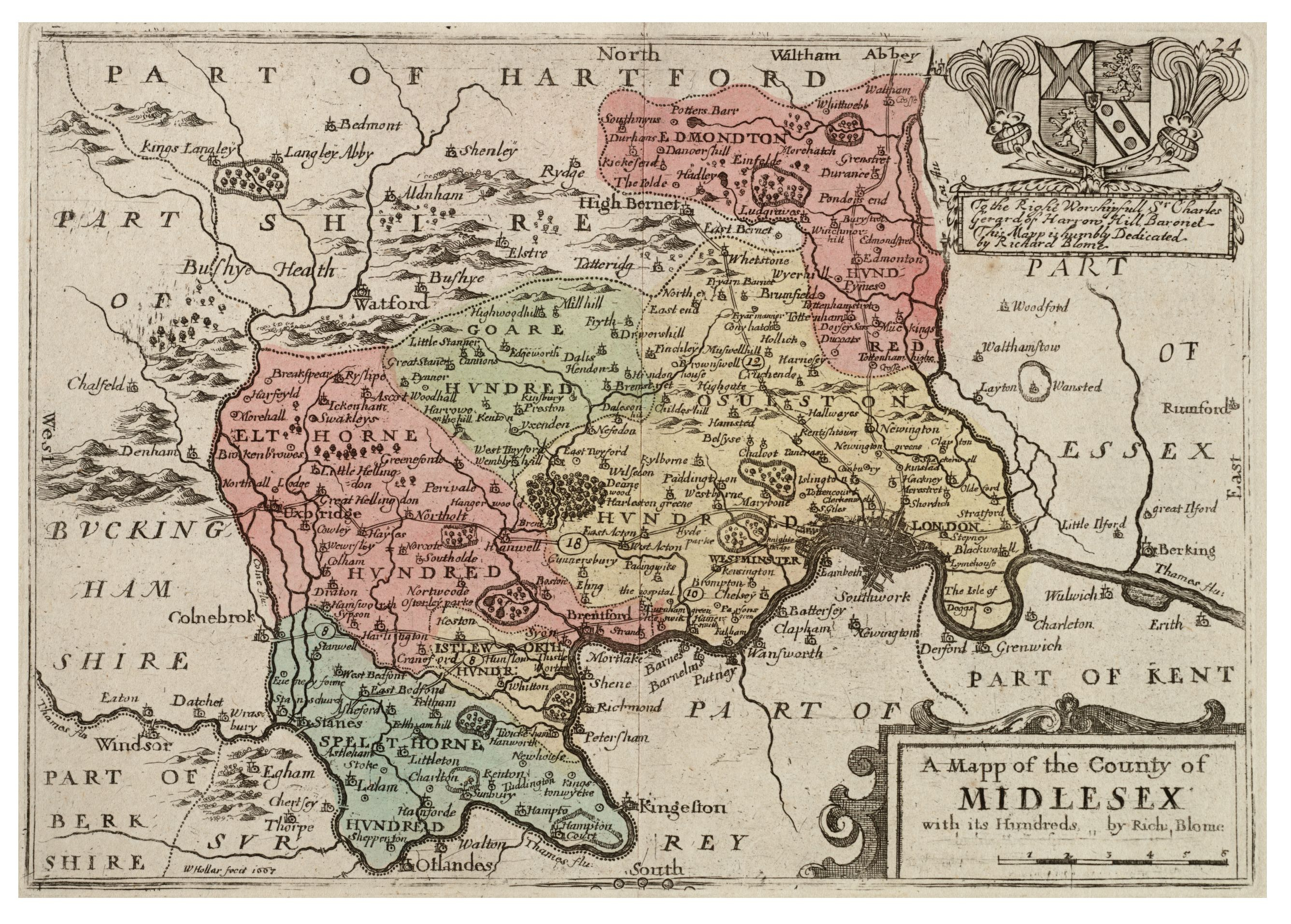
Extract of Wenzel (a.k.a. Wenceslas) Hollar's map of the county of unknown exact year (lived 1607-1677)

A "spinney" was inclosed as a park in 1246 to which the next year 24 deer were set up from Havering-atte-Bower. 24 acres (9.7 ha) in Hanworth (now in Greater London) were added to the park in 1270; rabbits were mentioned in deeds in 1251 and in 1276, 100 deer were sent to Kempton. Horses were bred at Kempton in the early 14th century as on other royal manors. The park was reserved (kept back) in the lease of the manor to the chief occupier (tenant) in 1340. Deer were still reared in 1376 and a grant of the herbage was made in 1384.

Henry VIII enlarged the park by 150 acres (61 ha) and in 1538 he ordered the stock of deer replenished. In 1594 the Crown let out the park with the manor. Kindly in 1631 its reversion of the freehold was granted with that of the manor to Robert Killigrew, whose father held an 80-year lease of the manor, with Hanworth, from 1594. A proviso in Robert's lease was that 300 deer be maintained within the park for the royal enjoyment but this was discharged in 1665 following the Civil War and interregnum or Commonwealth, under Charles II. As early as 1692 the estate (458 acres: extrinsic/implied rights, house, lands and park) was described as Kempton Park, a description that became usual in the 19th century. At the end of the 17th century the estate was about 460 acres (190 ha), 105 of which were called the Great Park, most of the rest pasture. By 1803 nearly 300 acres had become (private) park. Many of its fine trees were felled in the early 19th century but it sustained deer until about 1835.

In 1876 the estate was sold to a company who leased part of it to an associated company as a racecourse. The park was used in the World War I by the army and in World War II as a Prisoner of War Camp. The estate contained 360 acres in 1957 which remains largely uninhabited except for three cottages, whereas the manor has been developed as residential housing or turned into reservoirs, a museum and pumping works.

A fish pond was ordered to be made in the park in 1246 and shortly afterwards was stocked with pike. Bream were put in the pond in 1253. A large pond outside the now-eastern limit of the park lay within it in 1692 and 1803.

The site of the medieval manor house may be represented by the traces of moats west and north what was Kempton Park House. The first recorded visit of a sovereign to Kempton was that of Henry III in 1220. He came to Kempton often in the next two decades and less frequently in the later part of his reign. Jousts were held "in Kempton field" in 1270. Edward I visited Kempton comparatively rarely and later kings seldom or never went there. Many apparent references to their visits in the 14th and 15th centuries (perhaps too the jousting mention) seem to be Kennington which was closer to the convenient grouping of courtiers' customary London homes and lettings. (Note: Further supporting this research, Chenintune was the early written form of the name of that place, Kennington) The lord of Kempton granted the great tithes of the manor to Grestain Abbey in Normandy before 1104.

From 1229 appear many references to buildings at Kempton in the annals at Westminster. The king's chamber was mentioned in 1229 and in 1233 there was a chapel attached to it. The queen's chamber was mentioned in 1233 and the queen's wardrobe six years later. An almonry was to be built in 1233 and a hall was referred to in 1235. Two years later the chapel was rebuilt with an upper floor for the queen, and the king's court and chamber were enclosed by a wall. Various other rooms, gardens, and so forth are mentioned. A list was made in 1331 of repairs that were necessary; a record exists for 1340. It seems to have been demolished in 1374, when John of Kingston was given permission to sell all the timber and stone of Kempton manor house.

=== Royal chase as to game ===
Hampton Court chase taking in almost all land west of the new-found palace, and much of the parishes across the Thames seems to have been very unpopular from the beginning, and as early as September 1545, the 'men of Molsey and other towns in the chace of Hampton Court' were emboldened to lay a complaint before the Privy Council when it met at Oatlands, asking for redress on account of damage done by the deer, and other losses incurred by commons and pastures being inclosed. Their petition was referred to Sir Nicholas Hare; witnesses were allowed to appear before the Council, and were 'generally examined of their losses,' to which no reparation seems to have been made. In 1548, soon after the death of Henry VIII, a further petition was brought before the Lord Protector and Council, by 'many poor men' of the parishes of Walton, Weybridge, East and West Molesey, Cobham, Esher, Byfleet, Thames Ditton, Wisley, Chesham and Shepperton, complaining that 'their commons, meadowes and pastures be taken in, and that all the said parishes are overlayd with the deer now increasing largely upon them, very many Households of the same Parishes be lett fall down, the Families decayed, and the King's liege people much diminished, the country thereabout in manner made desolate, over and besides that his Majesty loseth yearly, diminished in his Yearly Revenues and Rents to a great Summe.'

The Lord Protector and Council examined twenty-four men of the parishes, and they were also interrogated by Sir Anthony Browne, Master of the Horse and Chief Keeper of the Chase, and it was decided that after Michaelmas that year the deer should be put into the Forest of Windsor, the pale round the chase taken away, and the land restored to the old tenants, to pay again their former rents. A proviso was however entered 'that if it shall please his Majesty to use the same as a chase again,' the order was not to be taken as prejudicial to the sovereign's rights. These lands (including Kempton) are therefore still technically a royal chase, and the paramount authority over all game within its limits is vested in the Crown.

=== Batavia House ===
A plain-fronted, two-storey house stood near the site of the manor house (roughly, today's grandstand) in 1692. The "fair house", built in this part of the parish of Sunbury by Sir Thomas Grantham in 1697, was likely its replacement. In 1711 Grantham was described as "of Batavia House", which stood outside the park near the present Batavia Road and had been demolished by 1806, but Batavia House seems, to judge from Rocque's map of 1754, to have been far less worthy of being called this than was the manor house. The 18th-century owners of the manor occupied the manor house, and Sir J. C. Musgrave continued to do so for a while after he sold it in 1798. In 1802 the exiled Duke of Orleans inspected and rejected Batavia House when he was looking for a house in the neighbourhood, describing it as a miserable place. After this the owner rebuilt it in a Gothic style which was described in 1816, before the rise of Neo-Gothic architecture as gloomy and unattractive. It was then unfinished but parts of the house and outbuildings were being sold for demolition. A Gothic coach-house still survived in 1959. Batavia house is said to have been blown up by dynamite and in 1845 it was described as a ruin. A smaller house, now demolished, was "probably built soon after" 1845 and a large aisled barn of timber and weather-boarding, with a tiled roof, which probably dating from the 16th or early 17th century has been pulled down.

== History of the wider manor ==
Kempton Park appears on the Middlesex Domesday Map as Chenetone a later variant of which was Chennestone, with a variation also seen of Kenyngton however many apparent references to Royal Jousts in the 14th and 15th centuries seem rather to relate to Kennington that was then in Surrey. Its overlord and tenant-in-chief was Count Robert of Mortain, half-brother of William the Conqueror. In 1086 the Domesday assets of the manor were: five hides; four ploughs, meadow for five ploughs, cattle pasture, eight arpents (approximately acres) of newly planted vineyard; its parish and church was at all times Sunbury.

At this time the manor contained the eastern part of the parish of Sunbury, adjoining Sunbury manor at a line running approximately along the course of the c. 1920-formalised road the Avenue. This area forms most of the ward of Sunbury East. Common land for all of the riverside villagers to make use of was to the north for all three parishes from Hampton to Shepperton. This area forms the wards of Sunbury Common and Ashford Common.

Robert's son William inherited most of his land and was attainted of treason and all his lands were forfeited to the Crown. In 1206 the manor was in the hands of, in fee, of William Rivers, Earl of Devon. In 1228 Hubert de Burgh surrendered his rights in Kempton to the king: these rights possibly arose from a projected marriage between Hubert and Joan of Devon but the marriage did not take place. Administration of Feltham manor became merged with Kempton during this period, or possibly even earlier. (Note: Thus a seat of both became Kempton Park for the enjoyment of the Lord of both.) A variant name of Kenton, now used in Kenton Avenue appears in John Speed's Middlesex map of 1611. Kempton does not appear at all in a place finder map of 1819 of the environs of London. In 1222 The Dean and Chapter of St. Paul's appropriated Sunbury's church, ordaining a perpetual and well-endowed vicarage; they sold the rectory estate after the building of a new church in 1799 to the owner of Kempton manor, for poor provision 10 acres (4.0 ha) of glebe existed in 1957.

== Land sold to enable a London Water Supply ==
In 1897 the New River Company established waterworks and reservoirs in the northeast of the manor to supply water to their facilities at Cricklewood. This company became incorporated into the Metropolitan Water Board in 1903, who completed the Kempton Park Reservoirs (which are now a Site of Special Scientific Interest) behind the racecourse when viewed from the grandstand and visible from the A316 (Great Chertsey Road); the southeast reservoirs were opened on the moving of the Southwark and Vauxhall Waterworks Company after an Act of Parliament prohibited them from taking water from the Thames below Teddington Lock. The Metropolitan Water Board Railway was opened in Kempton in 1916 to deliver coal from the riverside to the main London's drinking water pumphouse adjoining Hanworth — the reservoirs sitting considerably in Hampton. This coal powered the pumping engines. In 1929 the Board opened a new engine house for their pumps, and this has become the Kempton Park Steam Engines museum.

== Notes and references ==
Notes
