= Kempton Park water treatment works =

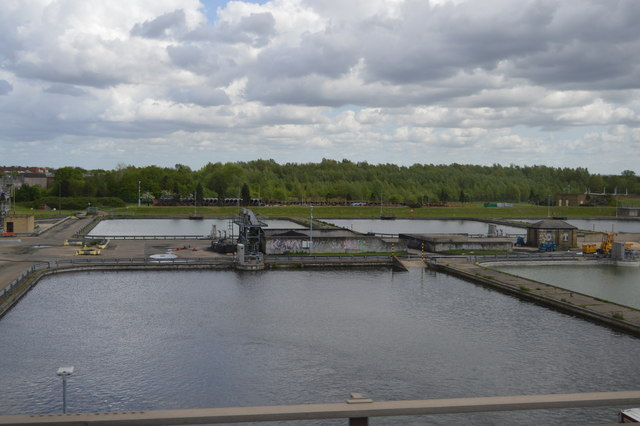

The Kempton Park water treatment works, in the London Borough of Hounslow and Kempton Park Surrey, takes raw settled water abstracted from the River Thames and supplies treated potable water to consumers in north and west London. The works were inaugurated in 1906 and continue to provide treated water.

== History ==
In 1896 the New River Company, the West Middlesex Waterworks Company and the Grand Junction Waterworks Company formed the Staines Reservoir Joint Committee. The aim of the committee was to construct a shared intake from the river Thames; two reservoirs at Staines; and an aqueduct to carry the water to their planned water works at Hampton and Kempton Park.

The New River Company acquired land at Kempton Park in 1897 (51°25.6120′N 0°24.2457′W) to build a new storage and treatment works, with the aim to provide additional supplies of water to west and north London. Construction began in 1900 and was substantially complete by 1906.

Meanwhile, in 1902 the New River Company and the seven other London water companies had been amalgamated into the Metropolitan Water Board (MWB).

== Original facilities ==
At Kempton Park the New River Company built two reservoirs with an area of 25 ha (62 acres) and with a combined capacity of 1364 Mega litres (300 million gallons). The reservoirs were supplied with water from the Staines reservoir aqueduct. Water treatment comprised twelve slow sand filter beds. A pumping station fed a 42-inch main to service reservoirs in Cricklewood.

When the Kempton Park works were inaugurated in 1906 the 42-inch main was not finished and treated water was sent to Finsbury Park, along the former East London water works 36-inch main adjacent to Kempton Park. When the 42-inch main was complete in 1908 it was capable of transferring 68.2 Ml per day (15 million gallons per day).

In the late 1920s prefilters were installed upstream of the slow sand beds. In 1947 the operating parameters of the treatment plant were as follows.

Kempton Park operating data 1953
| Parameter | Value |
Prefilters
| Number | 24 |
| Area, square feet | 9984 |
| Rate, gallons per minute/square foot | 3.00 |
Slow sand filters
| Number | 12 |
| Area, acres | 9.00 |
| Capacity, million gallons per day | 43 |
| Rate, million gallons per day/acre | 4.80 |

== Current plant ==
The Staines reservoirs provide about a 90-day retention period to allow settlement of solids. Water is transported to the Kempton Park works via the Staines Reservoirs Aqueduct. The first process at Kempton is a rapid gravity filter using sand, this removes larger solids and algae. The filters are periodically backwashed with an air and water scour.

The water passes to the ozone contactor. Ozone is made on-site, and is introduced through bubble diffusers at the base of the contactor. The water next flows under gravity through a slow sand filter with a granular activated carbon sandwich. Water is dosed with hypochlorite and flows to the chlorine contact tank.

Kempton Park works normally supplies 135 million litres per day Ml/d. It is capable of supplying up to 160 Ml/d.

An historical feature of the Kempton water works are the preserved 1920s steam engines. See main article Kempton Park Steam Engines

== See also ==
- London water supply infrastructure
- Kempton Park Reservoirs
- Kempton Park Steam Engines
- Staines reservoirs
- Cricklewood Pumping Station
