= Kempton Park Reservoirs =

Former reservoirs in London and Surrey, England

Coordinates: 51.426°N 0.395°W

- Site of Special Scientific Interest
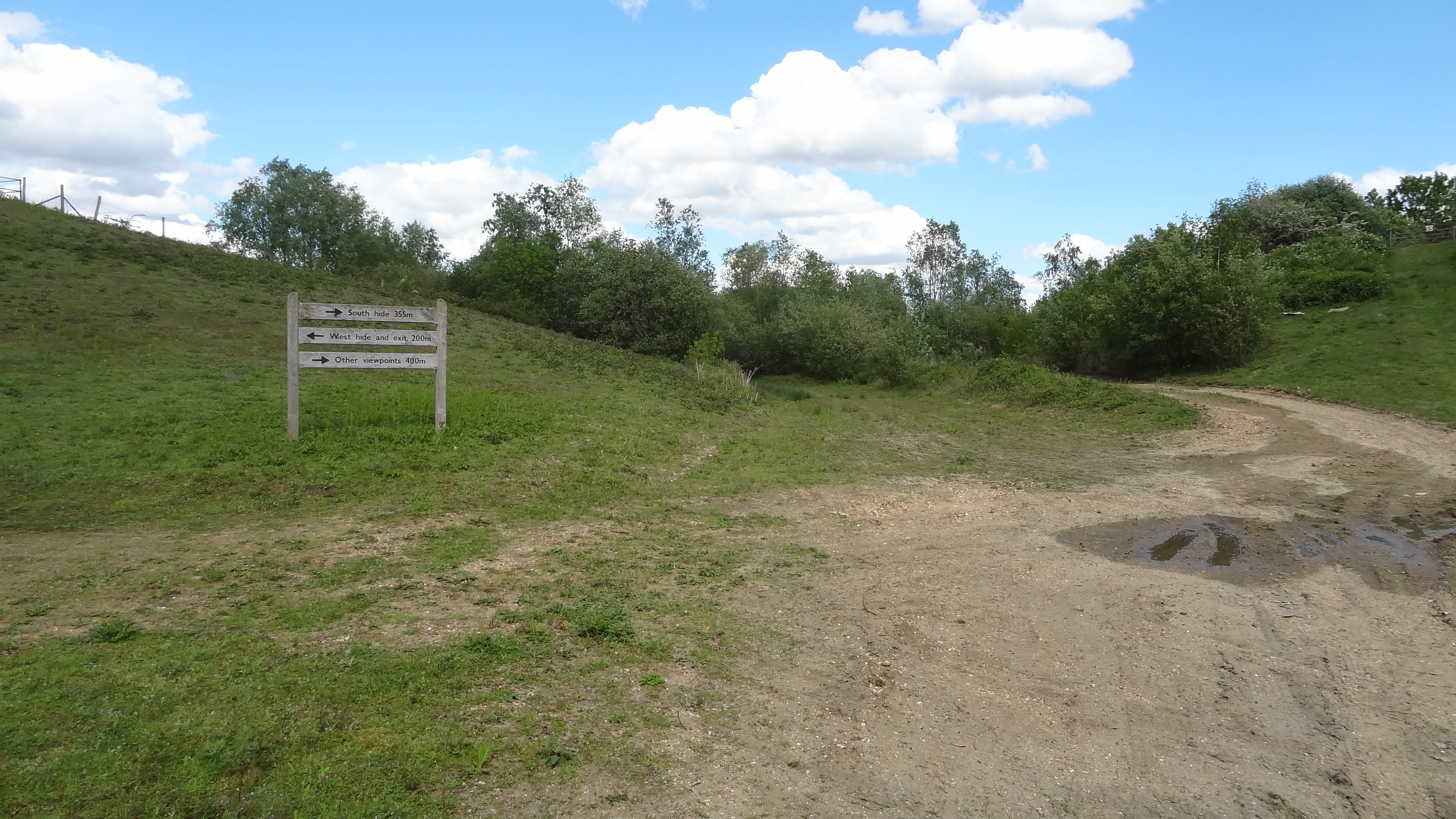
- View through the fence of Kempton Park East Reservoir
- Location of Kempton Park Reservoirs.
- Area of search: Greater London; Surrey
- Grid reference: TQ118707
- Interest: Biological
- Area: 25.6 ha (63 acres)
- Notification date: 1999
- Location map: Magic Map

Kempton Park Reservoirs are a Site of Special Scientific Interest in the London Borough of Hounslow and Kempton Park in Surrey. It is owned by Thames Water. It is part of South West London Waterbodies Ramsar site and Special Protection Area Kempton Park East reservoir is also a local nature reserve.

== History ==
The facilities at Kempton Park were established in 1897 by the New River Company, which was incorporated into the Metropolitan Water Board in 1903. Kempton Park East and Kempton Park West Reservoirs were completed in 1907. A third smaller reservoir, Red House Reservoir, was also constructed, being supplied by the Staines Reservoirs Aqueduct which passed south of the other reservoirs transporting water to Hampton Water Treatment Works.

The pumping station was opened in 1929. The two triple expansion steam engines were designed and manufactured by Worthington-Simpson. They are thought to have been the second largest such engines in the world. They continued to be used until 1980. They and the building they are in have now become the Kempton Park Steam Engines museum.

Kempton Park West Reservoir was closed and emptied completely. Kempton Park East Reservoir was closed in 1980, drained in 1982 and in 1996 had some of the embankments removed to comply with the requirements of The Reservoirs Act for redundant reservoirs. However it has retained a residual amount of water, supplemented by rainfall and since 1996 has been managed actively as a nature reserve. It is kept locked and there is no public access except for those holding a valid membership to the nature reserve.

== Wildlife ==
Works have been undertaken to protect and improve the habitats for wetland birds, including refuge islands, deep water channels and reed beds. Waders that breed regularly include northern lapwing, common redshank, ringed plover and little ringed plover. The first successful inland breeding in the British Isles of pied avocet was at this reservoir. Other birds recorded include smew, garganey, Temminck's stint, spotted crake and red-necked phalarope.

Red House Reservoir is still operational as a water storage facility. It is secluded and set in woodland which is popular with bats, water voles, grass snakes, newts, frogs and toads. Bats include common noctule (Nyctalus noctula), serotine (Eptesicus serotinus), Daubenton's bat (Myotis daubentoni) and pipistrelle (Pipistrellus pipistrellus).

== See also ==
- London water supply infrastructure
- List of Sites of Special Scientific Interest in Greater London
- List of Sites of Special Scientific Interest in Surrey
- Kempton Park water treatment works
