= London Museum of Water & Steam =

Museum in Brentford, London

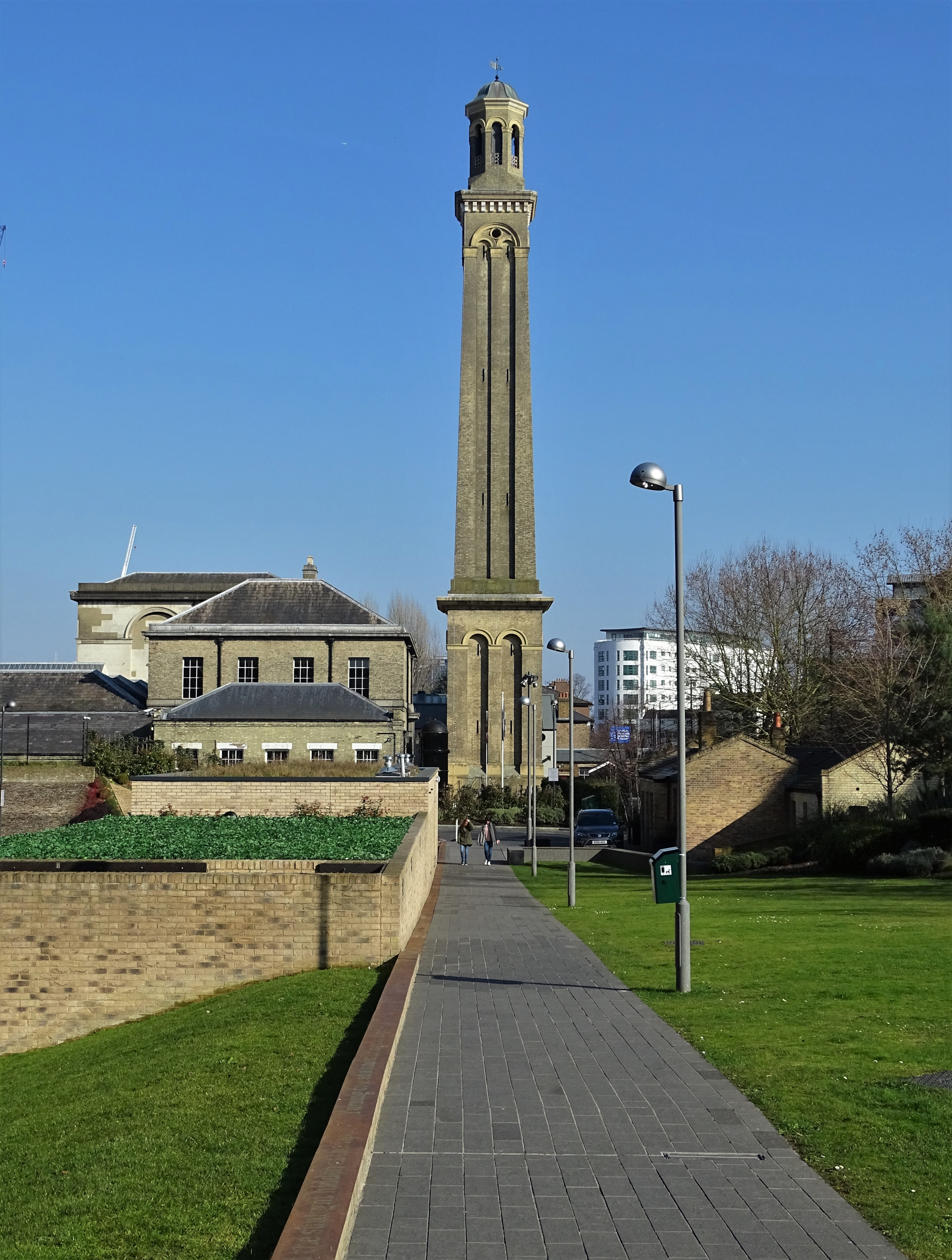
- The stand-pipe tower and engine houses

- Location within London Borough of Hounslow
- Established: 1975; 51 years ago
- Location: Brentford, England
- Coordinates: 51°29′20″N 0°17′25″W
- Public transit access: Kew Bridge
- Website: waterandsteam.org.uk

London Museum of Water & Steam is an independent museum founded in 1975 as the Kew Bridge Steam Museum. It was rebranded in early 2014 following a major investment project.

Situated on the site of the old Kew Bridge Pumping Station in Brentford, near Kew Bridge on the River Thames in West London, England, the museum is centred on a collection of stationary water pumping steam engines dating from 1820 to 1910. It is the home of the world's largest collection of Cornish engines, including the Grand Junction 90 inch (which was for a time the world's largest working beam engine) and the 100 inch engine, the largest surviving single-cylinder beam engine in the world.

The museum is an anchor point on the European Route of Industrial Heritage (ERIH).

== History ==
Kew Bridge Pumping Station was originally opened in 1838 by the Grand Junction Waterworks Company, following a decision to close an earlier pumping station at Chelsea due to poor water quality. It originally supplied drinking water to Paddington and Kensington; the service was soon extended to Ealing, and by the 20th century it covered most of West London. In the years up to 1944 the site expanded, ultimately housing six steam pumping engines and four Allen diesel pumps. That year, new electric pumps were installed and the steam engines were retired from regular service. Two, however, were kept on standby, until 1958 when a demonstration run of the Harvey & Co. 100 inch engine marked the final time steam power would pump drinking water at the site.

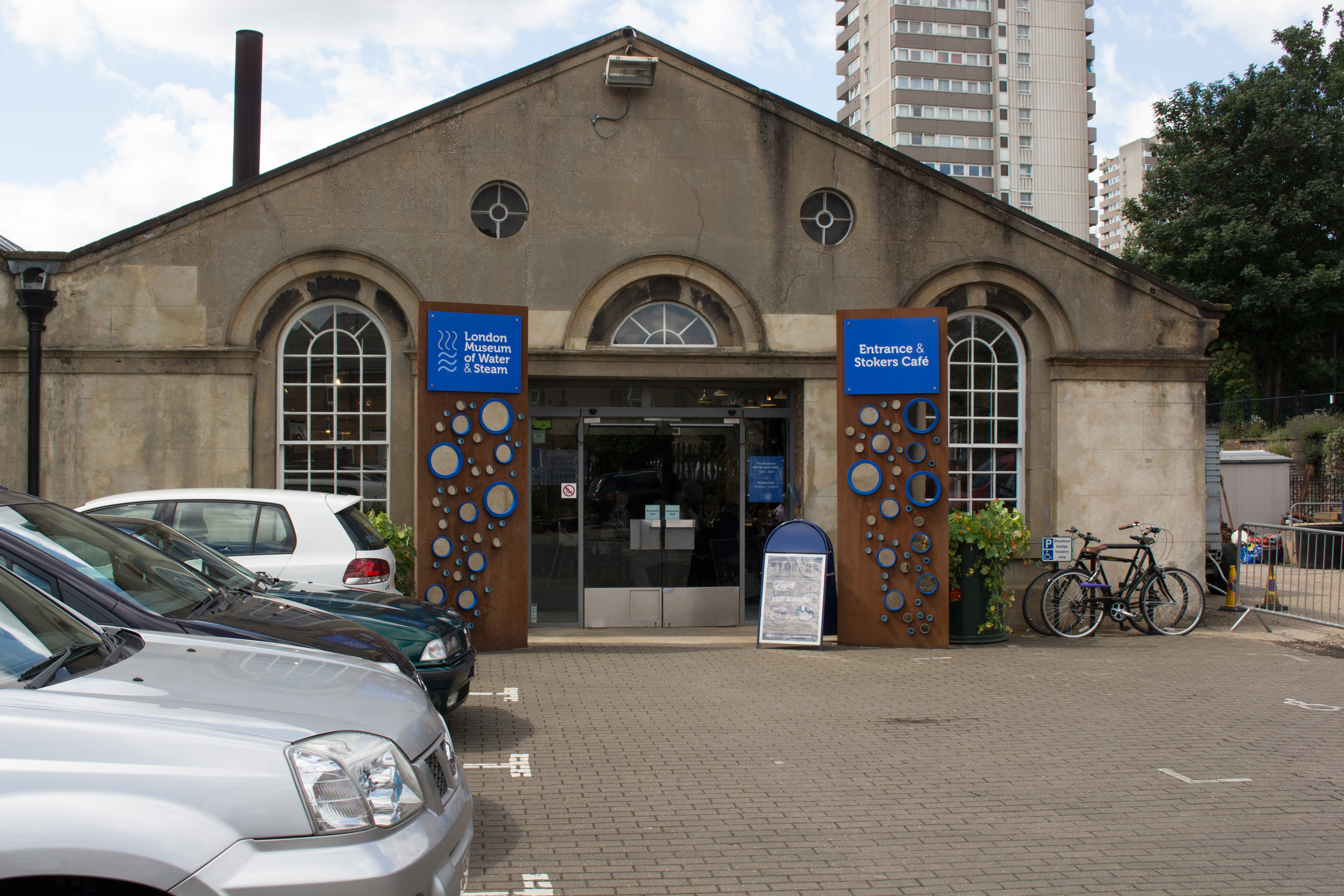
Main entrance (the old east boiler house) in 2015.

The Metropolitan Water Board decided not to scrap the resident steam pumping engines and set them aside to form the basis of a museum display at a later date. This action bore fruit in 1974 with the formation of the Kew Bridge Engines Trust, a registered charity, by a group of volunteers previously involved in the restoration of the Crofton Pumping Station.

Soon afterwards the site was opened to the public and, one by one, the old pumping engines began to be restored and returned to steam operation. The 1820 Boulton & Watt engine (the oldest in the collection) was the first to be restored to steam, in 1975. The Grand Junction 90 inch engine followed, in 1976, and the 1838 Maudslay engine in 1985. At the same time, a number of decommissioned pumping engines from other locations were re-erected on the premises, having been donated to the museum's collection.

In 1997 the museum was awarded an Engineering Heritage Award by the American Society of Mechanical Engineers (ASME) and Britain's Institute of Mechanical Engineers (IMechE). In 1999, the United Kingdom government Department for Culture, Media and Sport described Kew Bridge as "the most important historic site of the water supply industry in Britain". A second IMechE Engineering Hallmark was awarded in 2008 for the restoration of the 1856 Bull engine (which had been returned to steam in May that year), making the museum one of only 12 sites to achieve more than one of these awards.

== The museum today ==
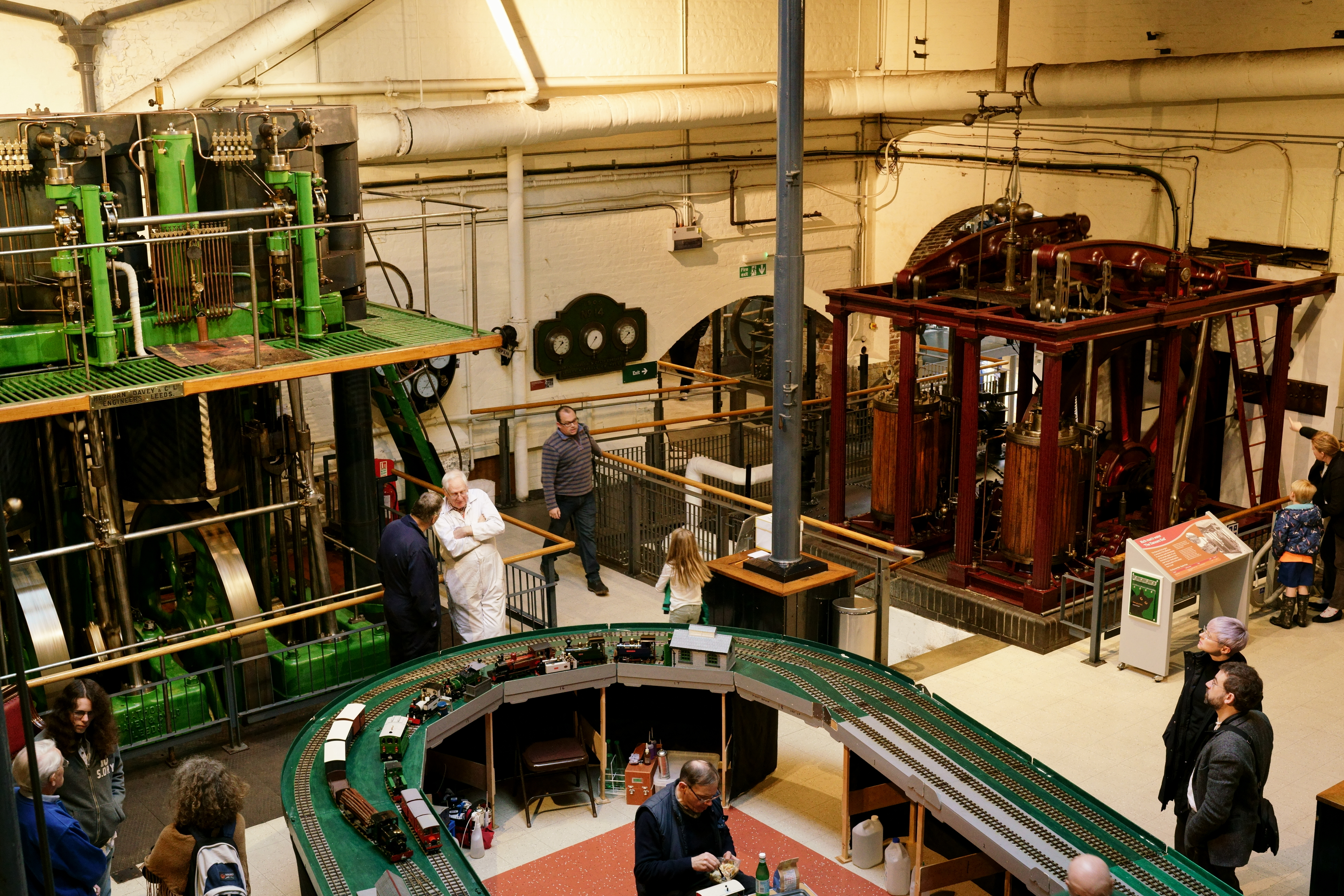
Rotative engines in the steam hall (the old west boiler house) in 2018.

In March 2014 the museum reopened to the public following a £2.45 million programme of redevelopment. This was made possible through a £1.845 million grant from the National Lottery Heritage Fund, with additional funding received from Thames Water, Hounslow London Borough Council and a number of charitable trusts. The museum now tells the comprehensive story of London's water supply, from Roman times up to the present day, through a series of displays and artefacts arranged across the site.

The Kew Bridge Engine Trust and Water Supply Museum Limited has three principal aims (as first set out in 1973):

1. to restore (and maintain) the five historic beam engines at the Kew Bridge site
2. to add other important water pumping engines
3. to establish a museum of London's water supply.

Today the site is an internationally recognised museum of working steam pumping engines, a reminder of the many pumping stations spread throughout London and the UK. The museum also runs an education programme linked to the National Curriculum and maintains an archive of steam and water-related items.

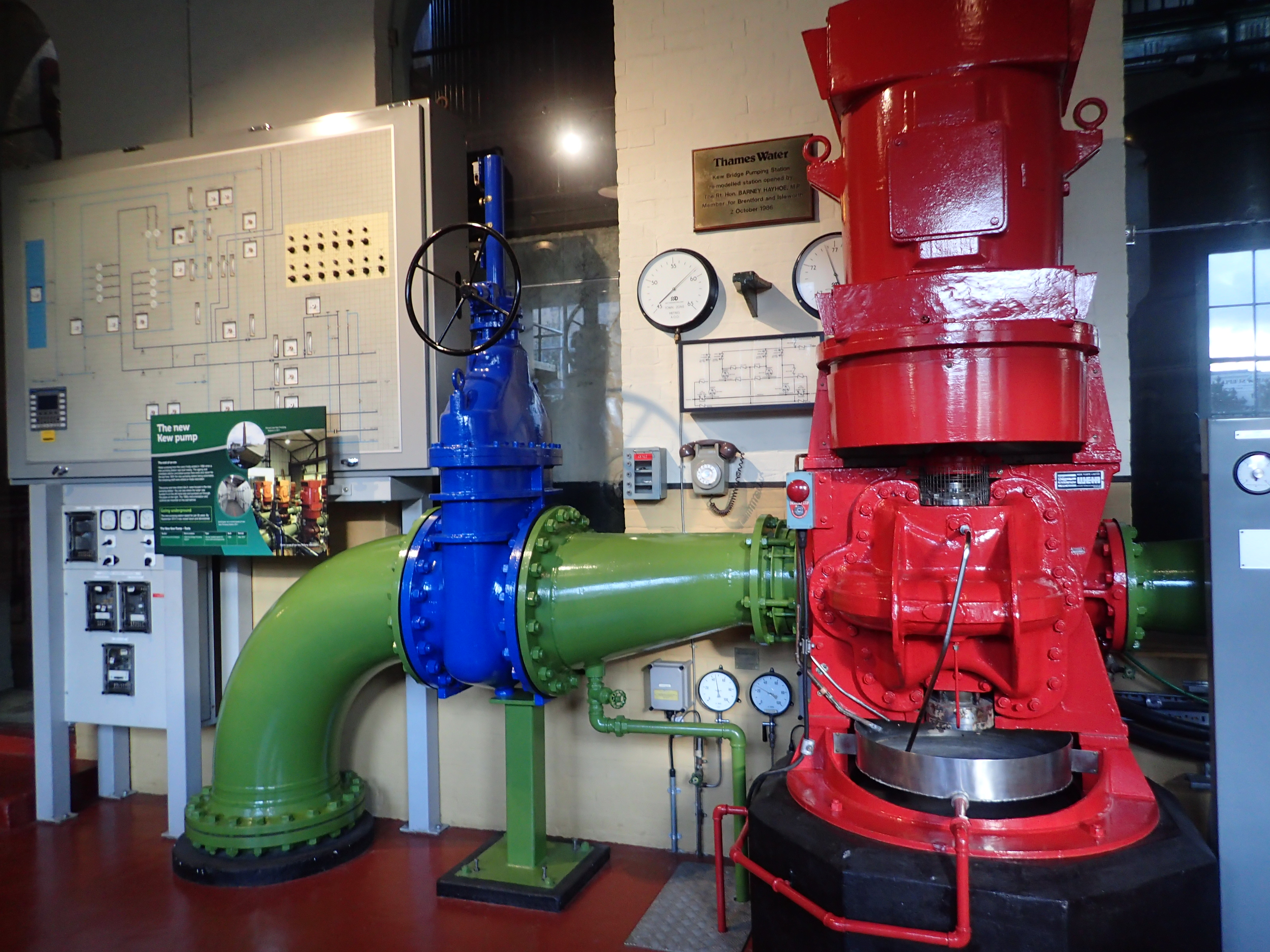
An automated electric pump by Weir (in service at Kew Bridge from 1986 to 2012) forms part of the new Electric House display.

Between 1975 and 2008, four of the museum's five original Cornish engines were returned to steam operation; in recent years, however, most of them have been out of action. The Grand Junction 90 inch engine has not been steamed publicly since 2015; and there have been problems (due to water ingress) with the Great Engine House in which this and the 100 inch engine reside. In 2017 the Maudslay engine was declared by museum staff to be 'no longer fit, or safe for further operation' and it was afterwards resolved that 'repair and further operation were not in the best interests of this object'. Two years later, the Boulton & Watt engine was taken out of commission; after a programme of repairs it was restored to steam in 2025.

Problems with the engines were compounded by the COVID-19 lockdowns in 2020-21, and by the failure of the museum's gas-fired Lancashire boiler in 2022 (which put all the museum's stationary steam engines out of action for 18 months, until a replacement boiler was found). Since then, the museum has when possible continued to steam the other engines in its collection regularly through the year: formerly the engines were in steam every weekend, but the "Steam Ups" now take place monthly.

In 2025 the museum was awarded a £2.6 million grant from the Department for Culture, Media and Sport’s Museum Estate and Development Fund, to restore the Great Engine House, a development which it described as 'key to preserving our historic engines and securing the Museum’s future'.

== Engines ==
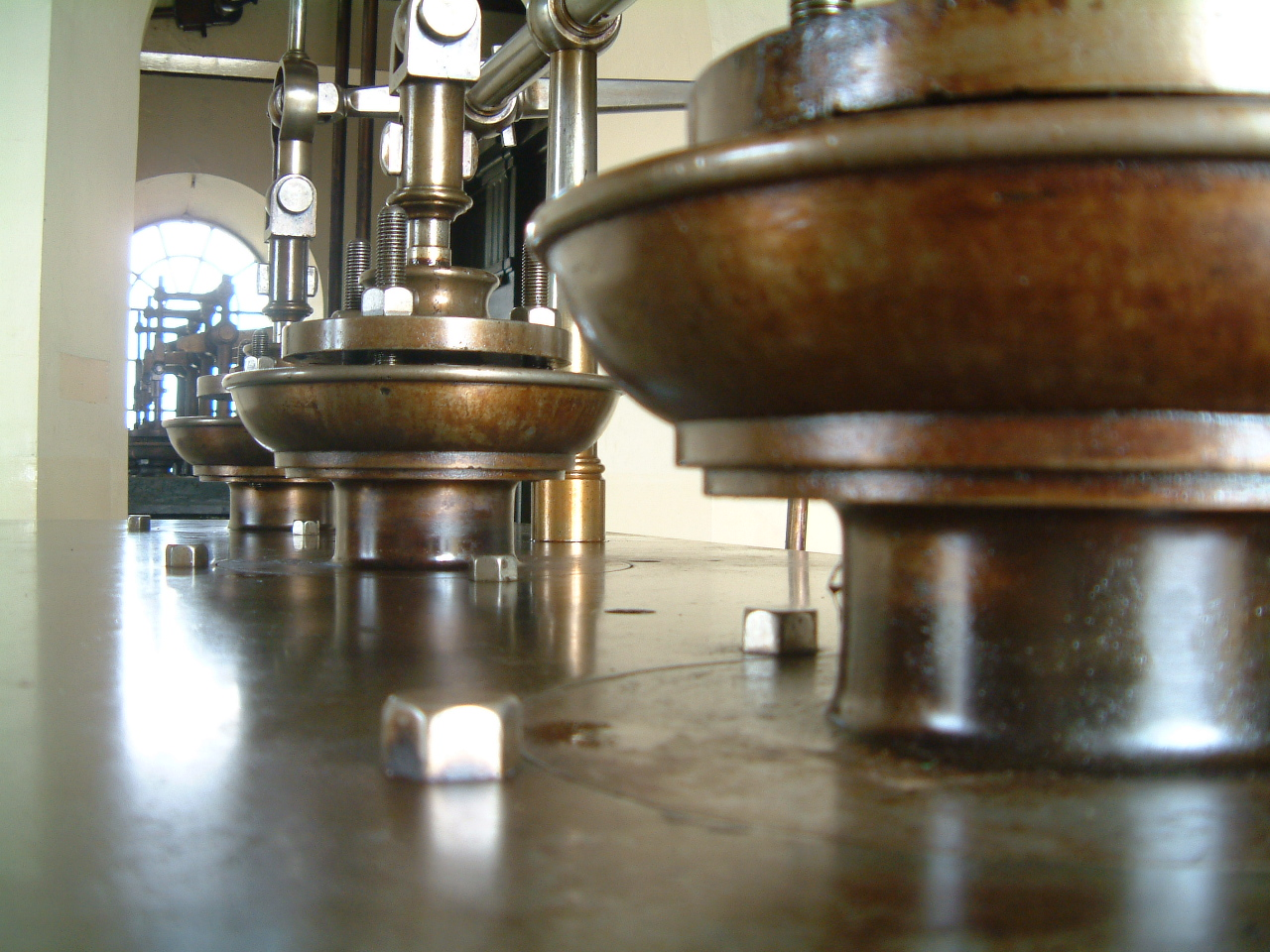
Steam inlet and outlet valves, 90-inch beam engine

The museum houses the world's largest collection of Cornish cycle beam engines. Following its restoration in 1976, the Grand Junction engine by Sandys, Carne & Vivyan of Hayle, with a cylinder diameter of 90 inches, was the largest working beam engine in the world. This machine is over 40 feet high and weighs about 250 tons; it was described by Charles Dickens as "a monster". It is one of a number of Cornish engines installed at Kew Bridge by the Grand Junction Waterworks Company between 1838 and 1871, the majority of which remain preserved in situ. They were all used to pump water from the River Thames to homes, businesses and reservoirs in West London, and remained in regular service until the mid-1940s.

=== Historical overview ===
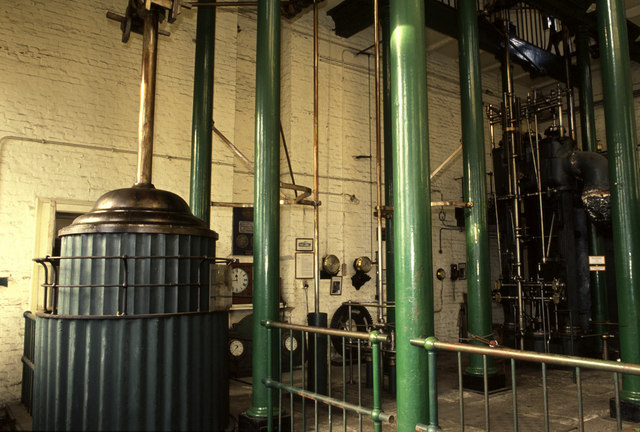
The Boulton & Watt beam engine (the oldest engine on the site).

The first engine to pump water from Kew Bridge was a new engine, by Maudslay, Sons and Field of Lambeth, which began work as soon as the station opened in 1838. It was joined in the engine house by an older pair of engines (by Boulton & Watt), which had originally been built for the company's Chelsea waterworks in 1820. Once the Kew Bridge works had opened, the Chelsea works (which were blighted by pollution) were closed, whereupon the two Boulton & Watt engines were dismantled and transferred to the new location (they were known as the West Cornish engine and the East Cornish engine). All three engines then pumped water direct from the River Thames to the company's reservoirs at Paddington.

In 1845 the company, with advice from consulting engineer Thomas Wicksteed, began to expand its output. It commissioned a new reservoir at Campden Hill, installed filter beds at Kew and built what was, at the time, the largest waterworks engine in the world, which came to be known as the Grand Junction Engine (or the Grand Junction 90 inch). New Cornish boilers were installed, and the older engines were modified to run at a higher steam pressure (all three were converted, from working on the Watt cycle, to operate like the new engine on the Cornish cycle). As well as building the 90 inch engine, Sandys, Carne & Vivyan also provided a pair of grasshopper engines to pump water from the river into the filter beds; these engines were installed alongside the Maudslay engine, in 1845.

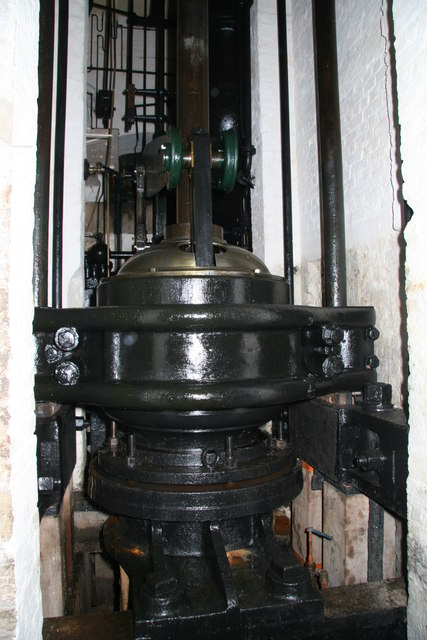
The plunger pump of the Bull engine is directly connected to the piston in the cylinder above (rather than linked via a beam).

After the passing of the Metropolis Water Act 1852 the company began to source its water further upriver, at Hampton (seven and a half miles away), from where it was pumped through underground pipes to the filter beds at Kew. This meant that the grasshopper engines were no longer required, so they were removed; in their place a Bull engine was installed, by Harvey & Co. of Hayle, which began pumping water to Campden Hill in 1859. Increasing demand led to the commissioning of a further large engine (also by Harvey & Co.), known as the 100 inch engine, which almost doubled the station's capacity when it began working in 1871.

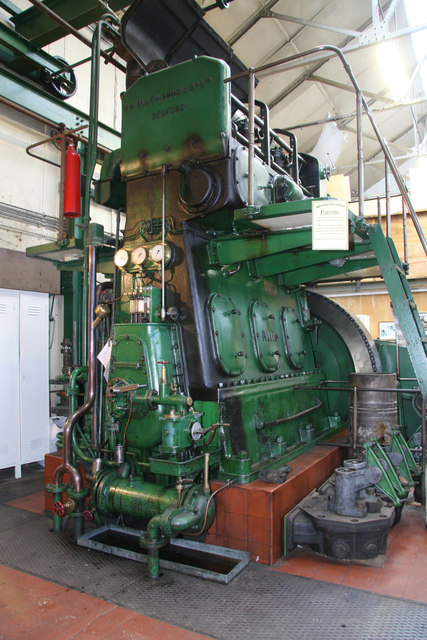
1934 Allen diesel engine.

All six engines continued to pump water well into the 20th century. They were supported by a Worthington duplex non-rotative horizontal steam engine (installed in an annexe to the west engine house in 1891), which had a separate set of boilers to provide high-pressure steam. From 1934, the steam engines were supplemented by a set of four W. H. Allen three-cylinder diesel engines, driving centrifugal pumps.

In 1942, the decision was taken 'in the national interest' to install electric pumps at Kew Bridge, in order to make 'substantial savings in labour and coal' (it being wartime both were in short supply). Six electric pump sets were installed in the annexe to the engine house (the Worthington engine was removed to make room for them). At this point the Cornish engines were stood down (the last in regular service being the 100 inch engine, which continued working through until 1944 when the electric pumps took over).

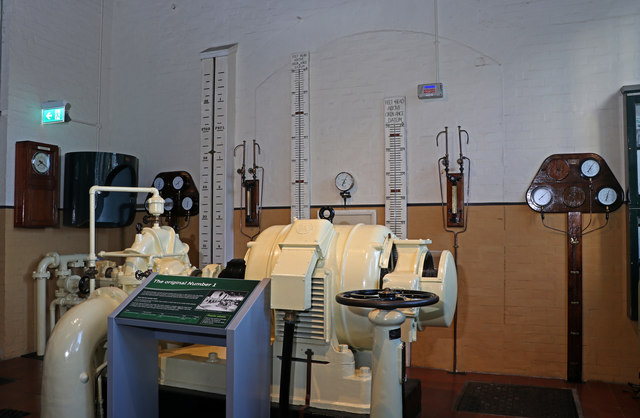
Preserved 1944 electric pump set (Lancashire Dynamo & Crypto motor, with a Hathorn Davey centrifugal pump).

Afterwards, the 100 inch and the Bull engine were kept on standby (fully connected to the mains) until 1958, at which point they were decommissioned: the fourteen boilers were scrapped and the boiler house chimney demolished. The extensive filter beds and reservoirs adjoining the site were also filled in at this time, and much of the surrounding land was sold for housing.

Although the East Cornish engine was scrapped in 1946, the remaining engines were all retained by the Metropolitan Water Board with a view to long-term preservation.

The diesel engines continued in service until 1985 (one of them remains preserved on site). The following year the electric pumps were decommissioned (with a single set retained for preservation). They were replaced by new automated pumping equipment: ten vertically mounted pump sets by Weir, which were installed in a separate building nearby. In 2012 these pumps were likewise decommissioned and the building was demolished (one of the pump sets having been donated to the museum). As of 2025, water continues to be pumped from Kew Bridge, but the fully automated equipment is located deep underground.

=== Collection ===
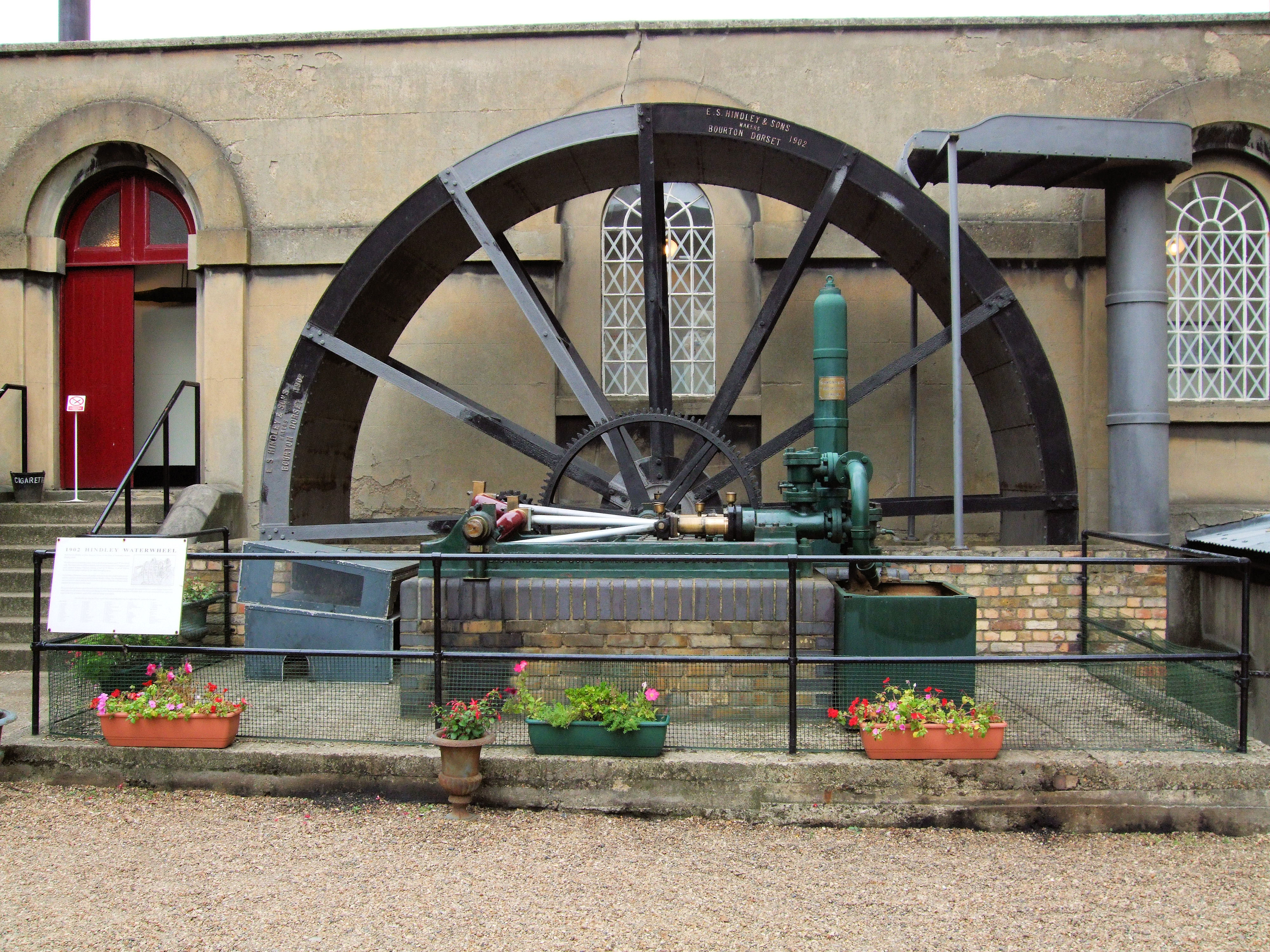
Among the museum's working displays is a 1902 Hindley water wheel pump.

As well as the former Grand Junction Waterworks engines, the museum has several other working steam engines on public display (in what was once the main boiler house) and these are frequently run. It also maintains a large selection of other water supply-related items.

This is a list of the principal steam pumping engines on display at the museum (the Cornish engines are the original working engines of Kew Bridge Pumping Station; the others are engines which, having worked elsewhere, were brought to the museum for preservation).

Cornish engines:

- 1820 Boulton & Watt (or West Cornish) engine (64 inch)
- 1838 Maudslay engine (65 inch)
- 1846 Sandys, Carne and Vivyan (Copperhouse Foundry) engine - the Grand Junction 90 inch engine
- 1857 Harvey & Co. Bull engine (70 inch)
- 1869 Harvey & Co. engine - the 100 inch engine

Other steam engines:

- An 1860 Easton and Amos engine (from Cliftonville Pumping Station in Northampton)
- The Dancer's End engine (by James Kay of Bury), installed on Lord Rothschild's estate in 1867
- The 1910 Waddon engine (by James Simpson & Co.), formerly one of a pair: when decommissioned in 1983 they were the last reciprocating steam engines in commercial waterworks use in the UK.
- A c. 1910 Hathorn Davey & Co. triple expansion engine (from Southfields Pumping Station in Newmarket)
- A small 1895 Benham & Co. pumping engine (from Mylees workhouse, Salisbury, where it used to draw water from a well).

Also on display is a working 1902 water wheel from the Duke of Somerset's estate at Maiden Bradley in Wiltshire, manufactured by E. S. Hindley & Sons of Bourton, Dorset and formerly used to pump water from the River Frome.

The museum also operates an 1860 Shand Mason Fire Engine on selected event days.

=== Gallery ===
The Cornish Engines
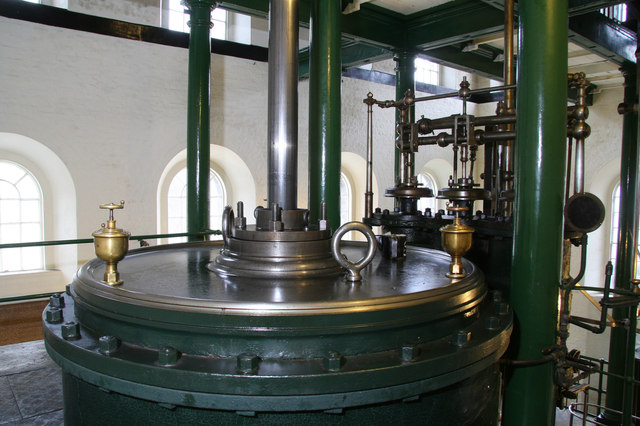
Cylinder head of the Boulton & Watt engine

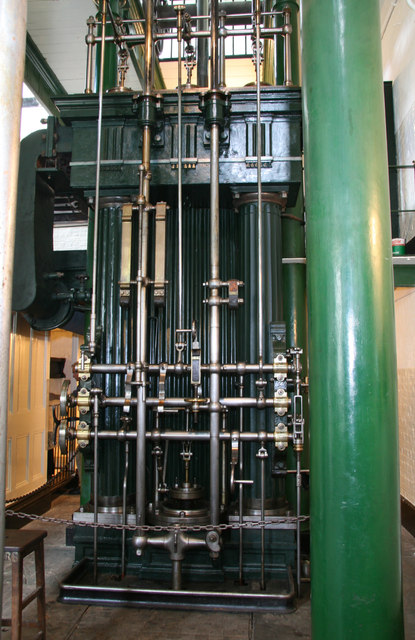
Valve gear of the Maudslay engine

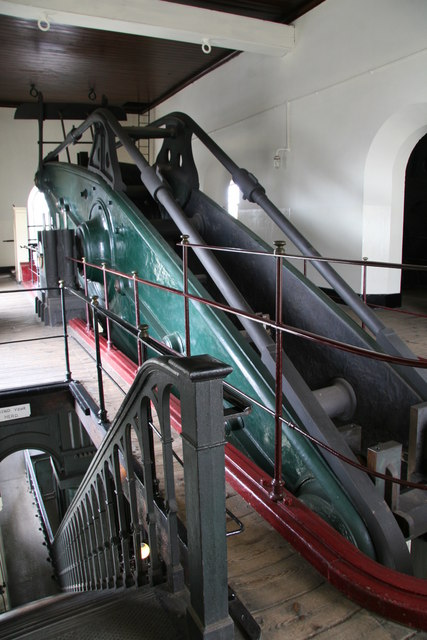
Beam of the 90" engine

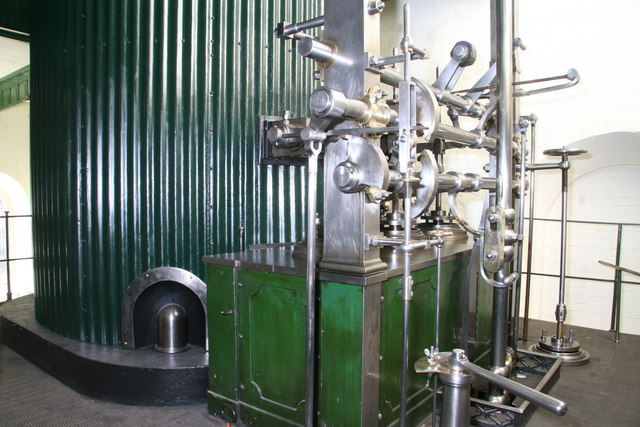
Cylinder and valve gear of the Bull engine

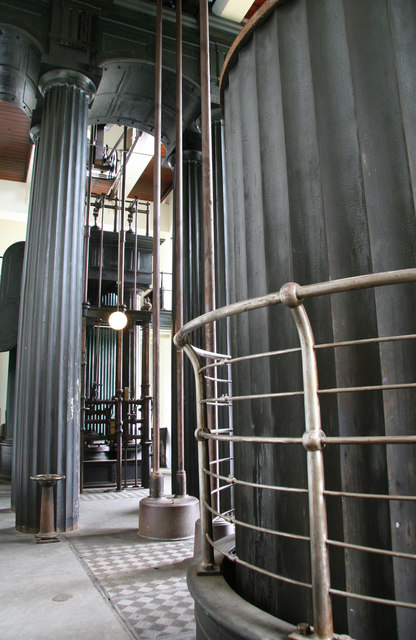
Engine floor of the 100" engine
Rotative Engines
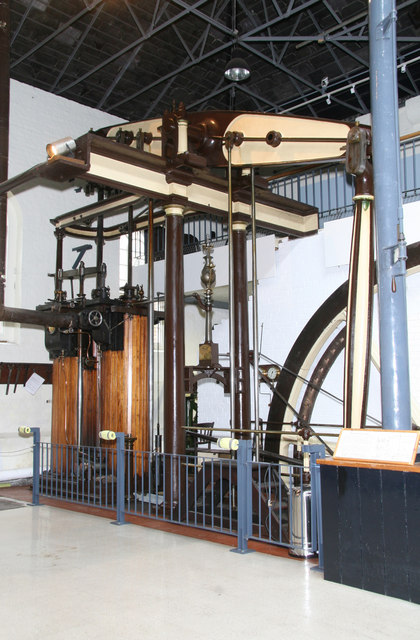
The Easton & Amos engine

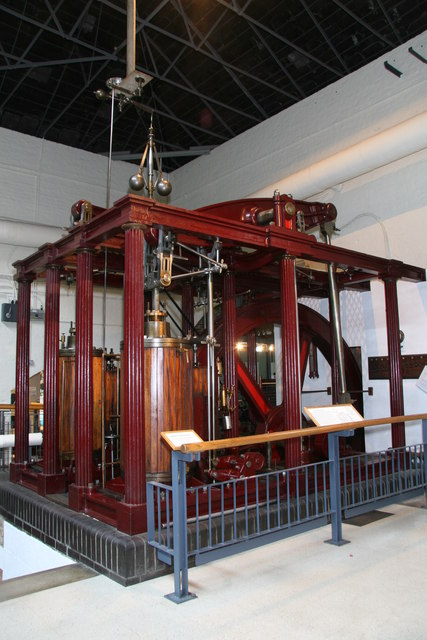
The Dancer's End engine

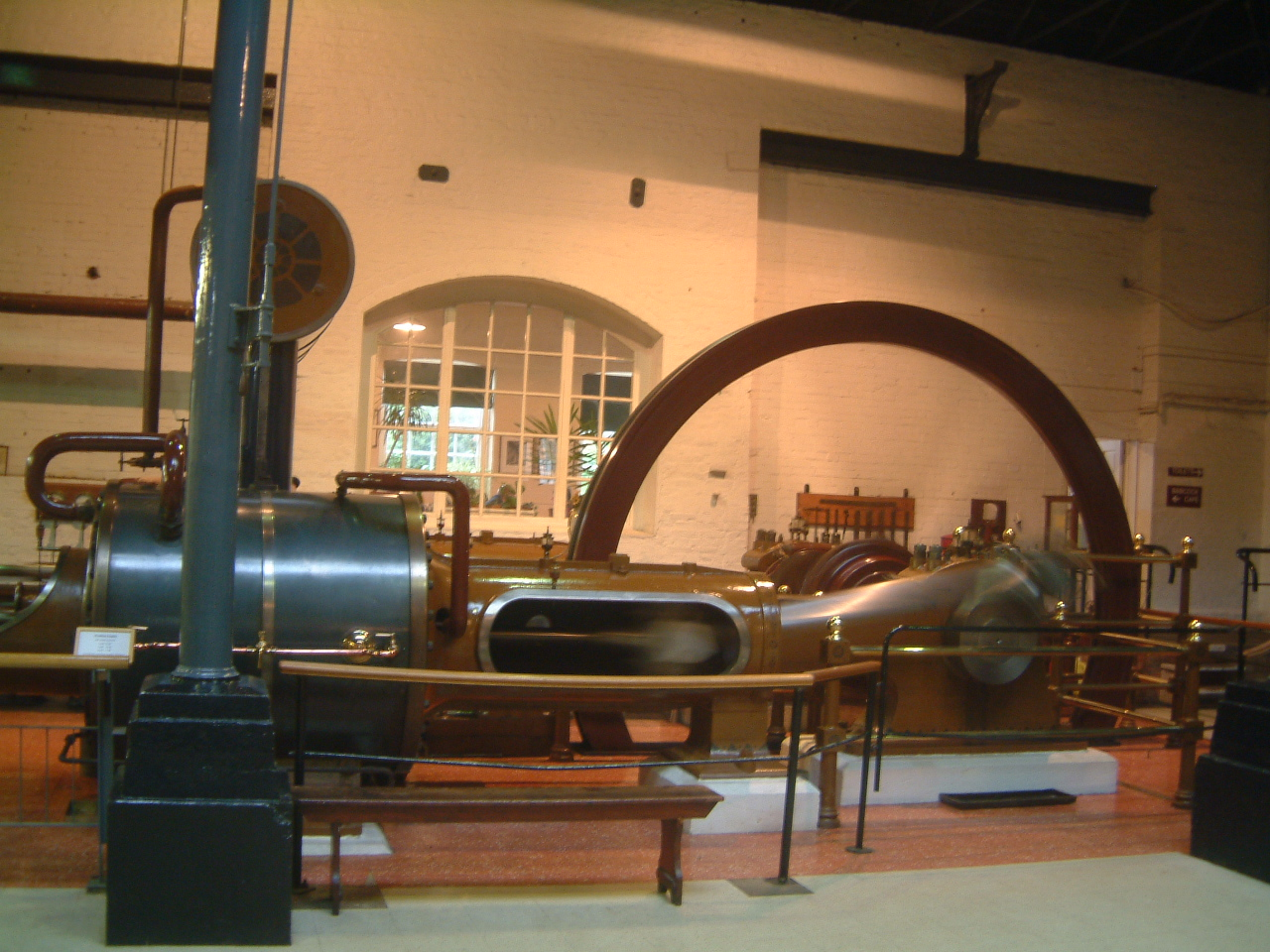
The Waddon engine

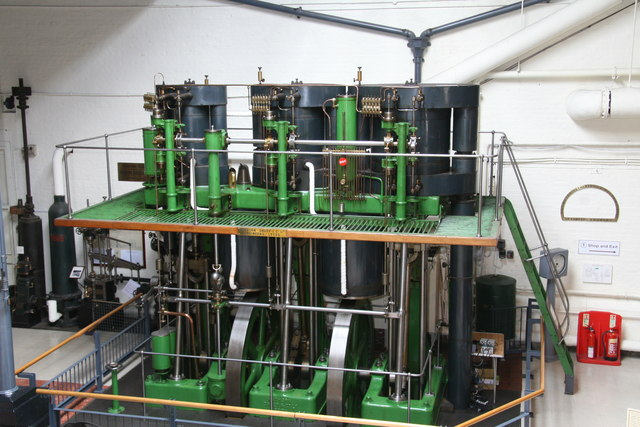
The Hathorn Davey triple expansion engine

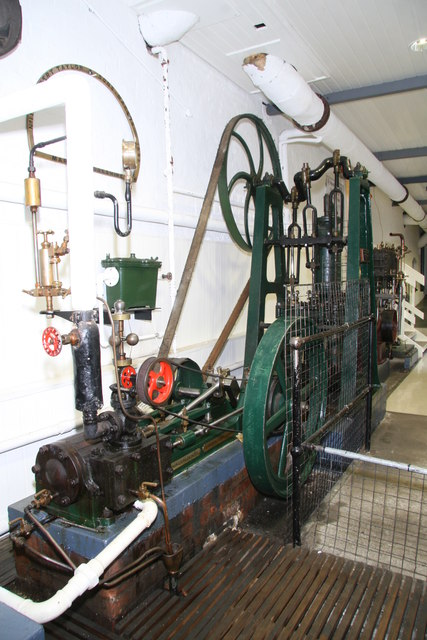
The Salisbury engine

== The site ==
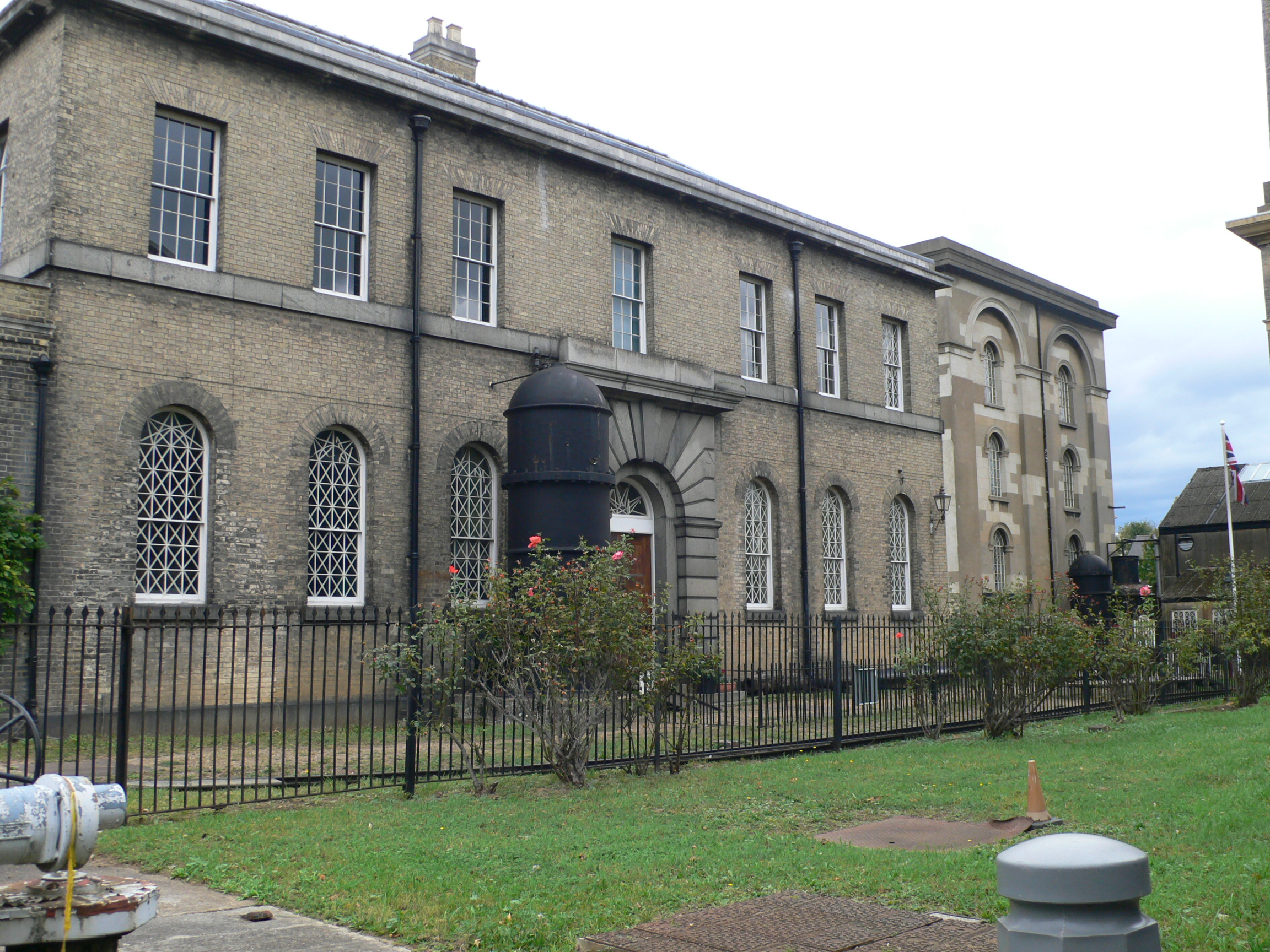
The 1837 Engine House (left) and the Great Engine House (right).

The museum site contains a number of Grade I and Grade II listed buildings. The original Engine House, home of the Bull, Boulton & Watt and Maudslay engines, was built in 1837 and is Grade I listed, as is the Great Engine House, housing the 90 inch and 100 inch engines, which was constructed in two parts in 1845 and 1869.

The Boiler House, which now houses the rotative steam engines, was built in 1837 (together with the attached coal store, where the museum's current boiler is located). In the 1840s a corridor was added, providing a link to the Great Engine house. A second boiler house was added, just north of the link corridor, in the 1850s. All these buildings, together with the 1891 annexe to the West Engine House, are Grade II listed.

A set of ancillary buildings, which include a fully working forge and belt driven workshop, are also Grade II listed, as are the gatehouse and boundary walls. The ancillary block is used by a number of independent artists and creatives.

Until the late 1950s, the site included several reservoirs and filter beds. Water from the Thames (which was pumped to Kew Bridge from the river inlet at Hampton) passed first into a receiving reservoir, and then (over a 'tumbling dam' for aeration) into a second reservoir, from where it passed to the filter beds. There were seven of these in total, covering an area of 8.5 acres (3.4 ha). The filtered water then passed into a 1.5-acre (0.61 ha) covered reservoir, from where it was fed directly into the pump wells of the engines.

=== The tower ===
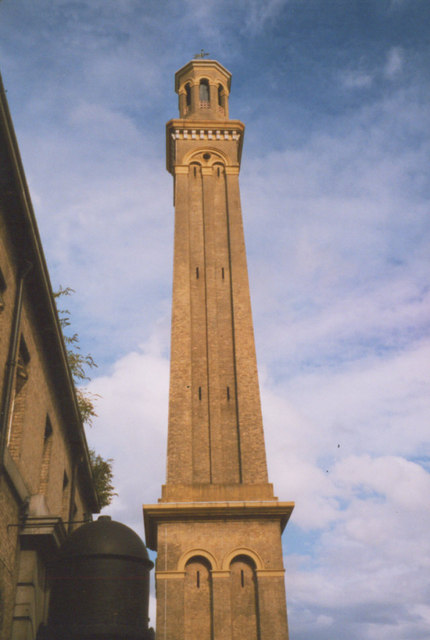
The grade I listed stand-pipe tower of 1867

The museum's most striking feature is its 200 ft high Victorian stand-pipe tower. This is not a chimney stack: it houses two systems of vertical pipes through which water was pumped before it entered the mains water supply. The brick tower, of Italianate design, was constructed in 1867 by John Aird & Sons, to replace an earlier open metal lattice structure (which had proven to be vulnerable to frost). It is a Grade I listed building. The tower is rarely open to the Public.

The waterworks used to have a chimney, in addition to the stand-pipe tower, but it was declared unsafe in the late 1950s and was subsequently demolished.

== Railway ==
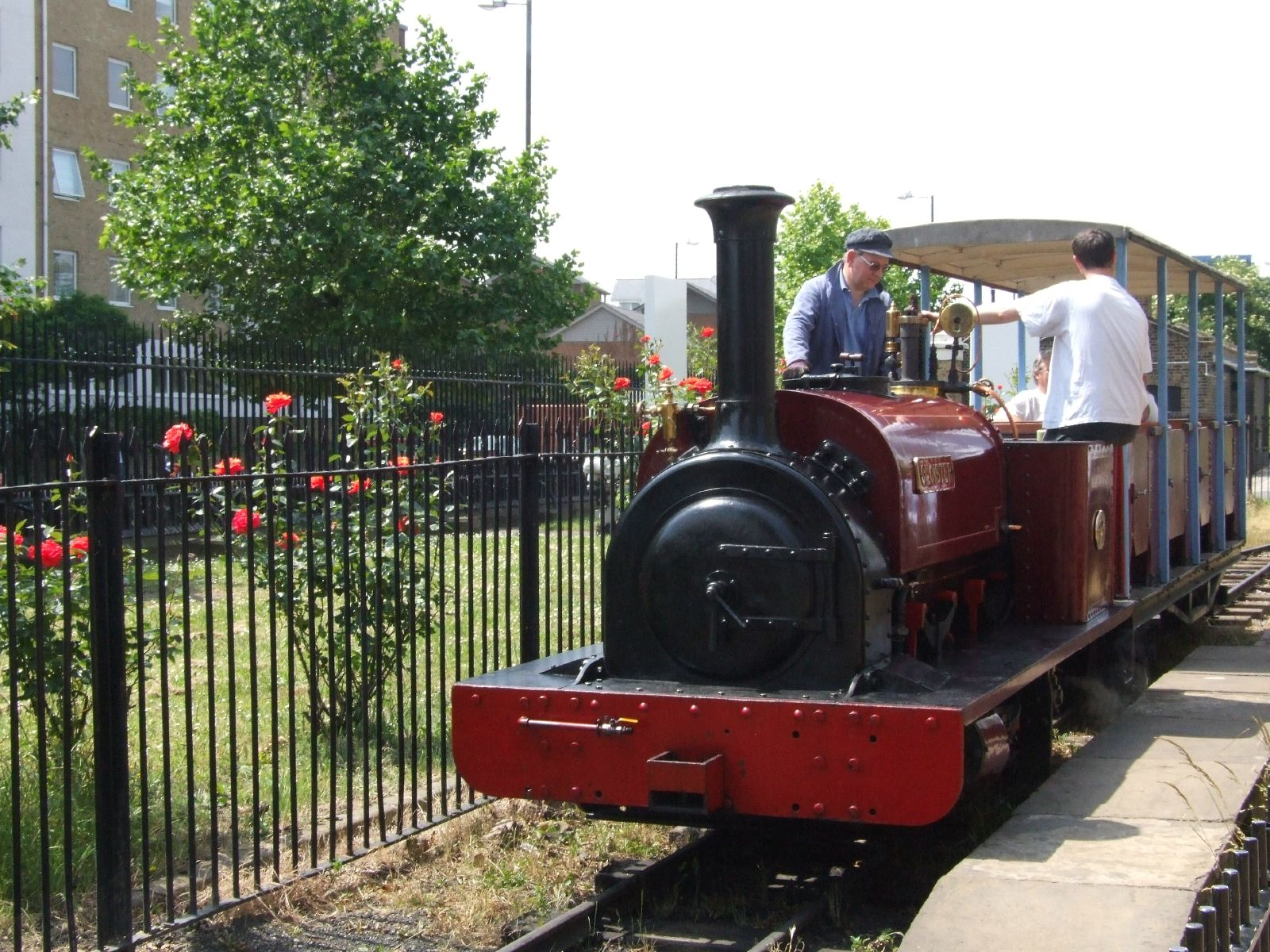
Locomotive "Cloister" (on loan) passes the museum garden

The museum runs a 2 ft (610 mm) narrow-gauge railway which in 2009 saw the introduction of a new-build Wren Class steam locomotive, named for the engineer Thomas Wicksteed. The railway had previously been operated by visiting loan locomotives. The line runs for 400 yards around the Kew Bridge site, and passenger trains are operated at weekends and on other special event days.

Although not an original feature of the waterworks at Kew Bridge, the railway was inspired by similar facilities provided at major waterworks in the UK, notably the Metropolitan Water Board Railway that originally ran between Hampton and the Kempton Park waterworks. A small part of that railway is now operated as the Kempton Steam Railway, comprising the only other site in London where rides can be taken on steam trains of such a large size; it has benefitted from some very generous assistance, in its restoration, from the London Museum of Water & Steam.

When working as a pumpworks, the site had a tunnel with an underground railway, to move coal from a private riverside wharf to the boiler houses. The tunnel is still present, but not accessible to the public.

=== Locomotives ===
Locomotive Name	Locomotive Type	Year built	Builder	Works Number	Notes
Thomas Wicksteed	0-4-0ST	2009	Hunslet	3906	Steam locomotive, of Kerr Stuart Wren class.
Alister	4wDM	1958	Lister-Blackstone	44052	Diesel locomotive, previously at Bala Lake Railway.

== Use in television ==
The museum has been a filming location for episodes of TV serials including The Kenny Everett Video Show, EastEnders, The Bill, Doctor Who ("Remembrance of the Daleks") and Industrial Age. As well as many music videos and feature films, including Jude Law's The Wisdom of Crocodiles, it was also used as the location for the 1991-1995 title sequence of the BBC music show Top of the Pops. After relaunching in 2014, the museum became a filming location for the fourth episode of the TV series PREMature. In 2026, the museum was used as a filming location for Series 22 of Taskmaster.

== See also ==
- Crossness Pumping Station – a steam-powered pumping station in Southeast London
- Kempton Park Steam Engines
- Kempton Steam Railway
- Metropolitan Water Board Railway
- Pumping station
- The Musical Museum is nearby
