= Kempton Park Steam Engines =

Preserved 1920s triple expansion steam engines

Kempton Steam Museum
- Kempton Park Engine No. 6 The Sir William Prescott

- Location within Greater London
- Established: October 2004
- Coordinates: 51°25′33″N 0°24′18″W
- Owner: Kempton Great Engines Trust
- Public transit access: Kempton Park
- Website: kemptonsteam.org

The Kempton Steam Museum is home to the Kempton Park steam engines (also known as the Kempton Great Engines) which are two large triple-expansion steam engines, dating from 1926–1929, at the Kempton Park Waterworks in south-west London. They were ordered by the Metropolitan Water Board and manufactured by Worthington-Simpson in Newark-on-Trent.

== Description ==
The Sir William Prescott in operation during An Evening at the Museum event

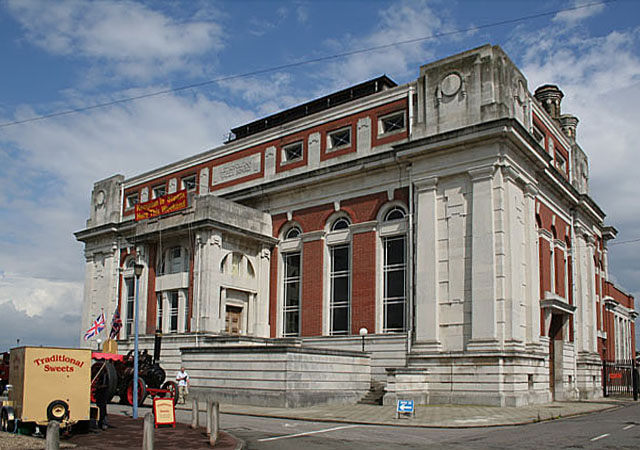
Engine house

Each engine is of a similar size to that used in RMS Titanic and rated at about 1,008 horsepower (752 kW). Each could pump nineteen million imperial gallons (86,000 m^{3}) of water a day, to reservoirs at Cricklewood, Fortis Green and Finsbury Park, for the supply of drinking water to the north, east and west of London. Raw water was supplied to the waterworks by the Staines and Queen Mary Reservoirs, which stored water collected from the River Thames. They were the last working survivors when they were finally retired from service in 1980. The engines are of an inverted vertical triple-expansion type, 62 feet (19 m) tall from basement to the top of the valve casings and each weighing over 800 tons. The engines are thought to be the biggest ever built in the UK.

Engine No 6, also called The Sir William Prescott, has been restored to running order and is the largest fully operational triple-expansion steam engine in the world. It may be seen in steam on various weekends throughout the year, and as a static display every Sunday between March and November. The other engine, Engine No 7, is named Bessie after Prescott's wife. The engine house also houses two steam turbine water pumps. One of these steam turbines has now been motorised to demonstrate its inner workings.

The waterworks is adjacent to the A316 Country Way, which is carried on a flyover over the grounds of the waterworks (just before it becomes the M3 motorway at Sunbury Cross flyover), between Sunbury-on-Thames and Hanworth. Road access is off Snakey Lane, Hanworth. The same site also features a two-foot–gauge steam railway, the Kempton Steam Railway, offering rides to the public on selected days.

The steam engines now form a museum operated by Kempton Great Engines Trust, a registered charity.

== In media ==
- The pumping station was used for the exterior shots of the Scrumptious Sweet Company factory in the 1968 film Chitty Chitty Bang Bang.
- The second series of the Channel 4 show GamesMaster was filmed on location at the Kempton Park Pumping Station in 1992 and 1993.
- The engines were featured in the Titanic films S.O.S. Titanic and Saving the Titanic. They were also featured in a short scene set in the Titanic's engine room in the film Holmes & Watson.
- The factory scenes of the 2000 TV adaptation of Agatha Christie's Poirot story The Murder of Roger Ackroyd were filmed here.

== See also ==
- Metropolitan Water Board Railway
- London Museum of Water & Steam
- Metropolitan Water Board
- Crossness Engines Trust
- Kempton Park water treatment works
