= Edward Bull =

English engineer

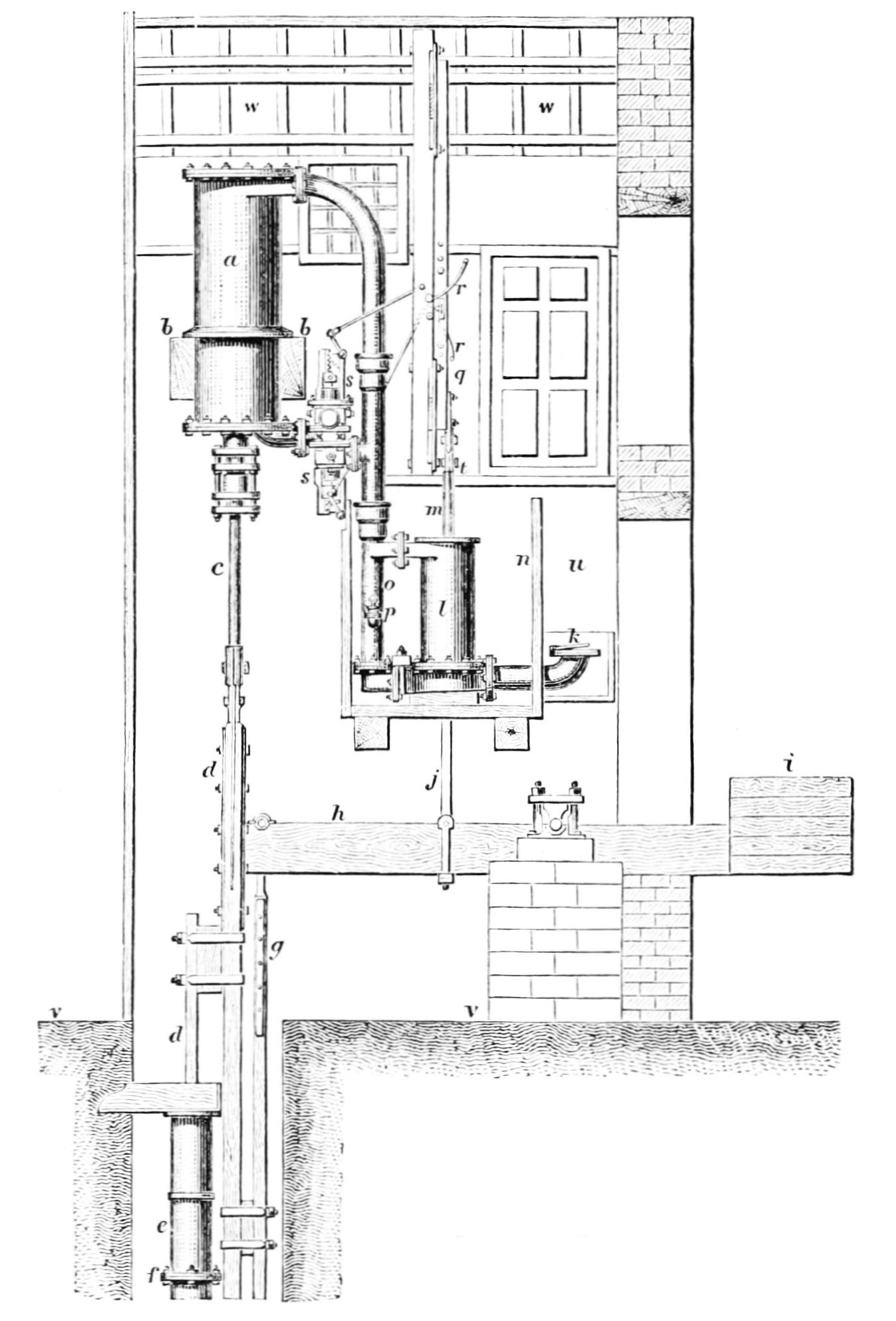
Diagram of a Bull engine (1798)

Edward Bull (c.1759–1798) was an English engineer, noted for a modified type of steam engine known as the Bull engine. Working with Richard Trevithick, many of these were installed in mines in Cornwall.

== Life ==
Bull was born about 1759. From 1779 he worked for Boulton and Watt at Bedworth Colliery in Warwickshire; Watt steam engines were used to pump water from mines. In 1781 he moved to Cornwall to install steam engines for the company.

From 1791 he worked independently. He designed an engine in which the steam cylinder was inverted over the pump, so that there was no need for a main beam, or rocking beam, and the engine took up less space. Working with Richard Trevithick, ten such engines were installed in mines, the first at Dolcoath mine.

Boulton and Watt claimed that the engine infringed the company's patents, and the case came to court in 1793; the verdict was in Boulton and Watt's favour. Nevertheless, Bull and Trevithick installed an engine at Wheal Treasury near Leedstown, and another was installed at Ding Dong mines. Trevithick worked on improvements to Bull's engine, while litigation continued; a further verdict in favour of Boulton and Watt came in 1799.

Bull died in 1798, and was buried at Kenwyn Church in Cornwall.

== Surviving example of Bull engine ==
A working engine, built by Harvey & Co in 1856, is at the London Museum of Water & Steam.
