= Dean Stalham =

British artist, playwright and activist

Dean Stalham (born c. 1963) is a British self-taught artist, playwright and community activist from North London. He has spent time in prison for handling stolen artworks.

Stalham was born in north London and grew up in Cricklewood.

Mr Stalham's police charge sheet runs to several pages. In 1980, age 17, he was found guilty of stealing a car and fined £100. In 1984 he was arrested for assault; in 1986 for carrying a knife in a public place. Then in 1994, aged 31, he was jailed for two years for conspiring to defraud banks, after police smashed his fake credit card ring which stretched from Rotterdam to Lagos.

Whilst serving time in Wandsworth Prison he won a prize for his art from the Koestler Trust.

He founded the Art Saves Lives community interest company in 2009, which was dissolved in 2014.

== Theatre ==
In 2010 Stalham wrote a play, God Don't Live on a Council Estate, and staged it in an old council office building in New Cross. WhatsonStage.com described it as "an emotionally gripping and riveting production", while theguardian.com called it "different" and "of high quality".

His play, The Barred, was performed in at London's Royal Court Theatre in February 2015 and at Croydon's Fairfield Halls in July 2015.
