= Hampton Kempton Waterworks Railway =

Railway in London

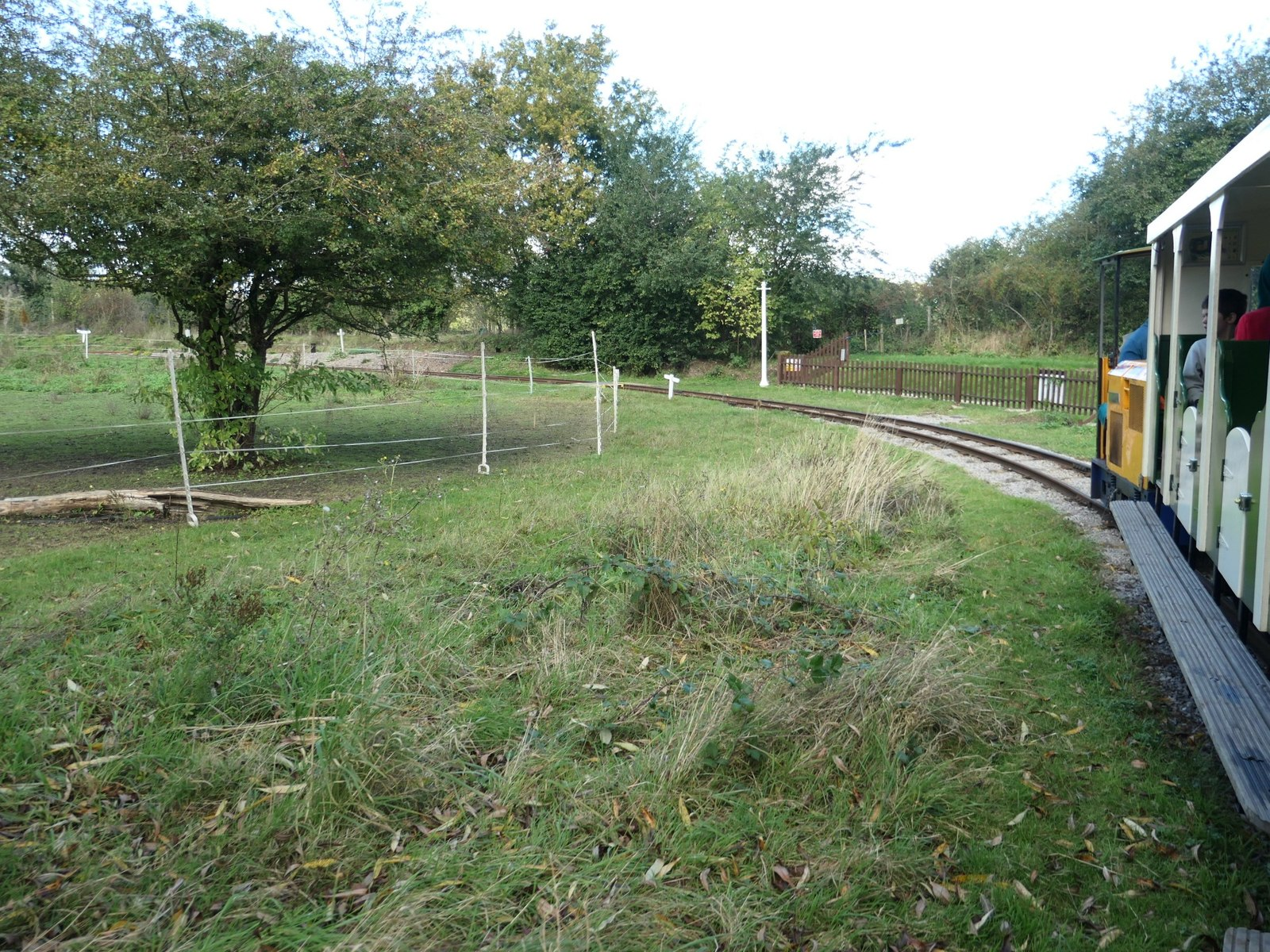
- Locomotive drawing a carriage of passengers
- Locale: London Borough of Hounslow
- Coordinates: 51.4259°N 0.405°W

Preserved operations
- Stations: 1
- Length: 0.18 miles
- Preserved gauge: 2 ft (610 mm)

Commercial history
- 1914-1916: Built as part of the waterworks infrastructure
- Closed: 1945

Preservation history
- 2013: Reopened as passenger railway

Website
- http://www.hamptonkemptonrailway.org.uk/

The Hampton Kempton Waterworks Railway is a 2 ft (610 mm) gauge narrow gauge steam railway that opened in 2013, giving rides to paying visitors on a restored steam locomotive, with two back-up diesel locomotives. It is based on the site of an industrial railway that served Kempton Waterworks.

== History ==
The original 2 ft (610 mm) gauge railway, known as the Metropolitan Water Board Railway, was built between 1914 and 1916 to carry coal from a wharf on the River Thames to the furnaces of the regional water supply's pumping stations on the Hanworth/Hampton border. At its peak it carried 760 tons of coal a week. In 1945 the line closed, the trackbed becoming a road for maintenance workers. In May 2003, the Metropolitan Water Board Railway Society was formed with the intention of re-opening the railway as a 2 ft (610 mm) gauge passenger-carrying line between Hampton and the Kempton Great Engine House.

The chief executive of Thames Water attended the opening of the railway in 2013 (and hereditary building and civil engineering magnate Sir William McAlpine).

== Operation ==
The locomotive, with driver, hauls passengers in covered carriages. Each has four seats abreast and proper housing and ramp for a wheelchair. The first section of track is a loop, which operates on selected non-winter weekends. The steam locomotive being used is "Darent", built in 1903 (formerly of Provan Gas Works, Glasgow). Two diesel locomotives have added from a mine in Indonesia; they are in working order, but subject to some further restoration, so all trains are currently steam-hauled.

The site has the sole Ransomes & Rapier crane nationally in working order..

Initially the project was loaned a suitable steam engine by London Museum of Water & Steam - enabling the Kempton Railway to open on schedule in May 2013. The London Museum of Water & Steam also has a 400-yard section of alike track, open weekends. These form the two places in London for mid-size steam trains. At full size, seasonal trips such as the Cathedral Express operate on regular lines and "heritage" steam-engine lines, giving some mothballed lines a revival outside of London.

== Fleet List ==
Name	Other Number(s)	Original railway	Builder	Works Number	Built	Wheel Arrangement	Notes	Image
Darent (Note: On long-term loan to the railway by its owner)	3	Provan Gas Works	Andrew Barclay	984	1903	0-4-0ST	Built for the Provan Gas Works in Glasgow. Sold for scrap in 1961, but purchased by Rich Morris in May 1963. Was one display at Gloddfa Ganol; when that closed in 1997, it was purchased for use on the Eynsford Light Railway, converted to 2 ft (610 mm) and fitted with a cab and saddle tank.	
Spelthorne	52	(Far East)	Hunslet	9357	1995	4wDH		
	53	(Far East)	Hunslet	9338	1994	4wDH		
Hounslow	51		Science Projects Limited		2008	4wPH	On loan from the manufacturer	
		(Celtic Football Club)	Motor Rail	4023	1928	4wPM rebuilt as 4wDM		
			Hibberd	3787	1956	4wDM		

== Further plans ==
The planned second phase of the railway involves the construction of a further three miles of track, leading from the existing loop towards the Upper Sunbury Road, Hampton, and it will pass a reservoir. The restored track would run across land owned by Thames Water. On Monday 19 March 2018, the lease to extend the railway was signed at a ceremony attended by the CEO of Thames Water Steve Robertson, the Deputy Mayor Hounslow, Mayor of Spelthorne, Deputy Mayor of Richmond upon Thames and members of the heritage railway not-for-profit company; planning permission is sought.
