= Cricklewood Baptist Church =

Coordinates: 51.5546°N 0.2248°W

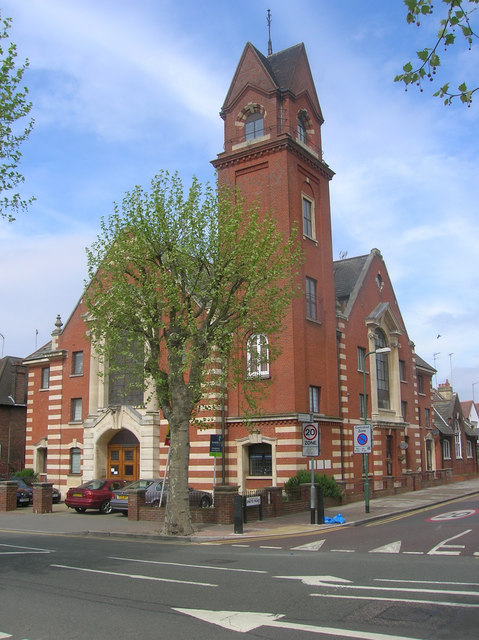
- Cricklewood Baptist Church
- Location: Cricklewood Baptist Church, 2 Sneyd Road, Cricklewood, Brent, London, NW2 6AN
- Country: England
- Denomination: Baptist

History
- Dedicated: 1908

Architecture
- Years built: 1907

Cricklewood Baptist Church is a Baptist church in Cricklewood, London, and is part of the London Baptist Association. Built in 1907, the church had its first service on 5 January 1908. In 1930, a church hall was added and after the main church building was sold to property developers in 1990, the hall became the central place of worship for the congregation.

== Historical background ==
The area around the church was owned by All Souls College, Oxford and in 1900, housing was built along Anson Road. By 1904 there were 210 houses in the area and another 65 were being built. The influx of people and the number of houses being built began to give Cricklewood an identity as a residential district and it was during this time that several churches were built. A Congregationalist church opened on Chichele Road in 1893, St Gabriels, Cricklewood Anglican church opened on Walm Lane in 1898 and St. Michael's Anglican church opened on St Michael's Road in 1910. Cricklewood Baptist Church celebrated its centenary in November 2008 with a visit from local Liberal Democrat MP, Sarah Teather.

In December 2014, the congregation held a carol service in the foyer of the original church building on Anson Road. This was the first service to be held in the old church since it was sold to developers in 1990 and became Trinity Court.

== Architectural features ==
The building was designed by Arthur Keen of Kenton & Company, Clerkenwell in the style of Italian Byzantine architecture and consists of red and yellow brick. The church tower is a recognisable landmark and the west window of the hall contains an Art Deco stained glass window depicting Christ holding a sheep. Along the north wall are several smaller stained glass windows telling the Parable of the Sower.
