= Thomas Wicksteed =

Thomas Wicksteed (26 January 1806 – 15 November 1871) was an English civil engineer. As engineer to the East London Waterworks Company, he was responsible for introducing the Cornish engine for water supply.

== Career ==
Born in Shrewsbury, the fourth son of John Wicksteed, he was educated at Shrewsbury School, and at sixteen years of age he was sent to London, to reside with his father's old friend, Arthur Aikin, Secretary of the Society of Arts. He was articled to a mechanical engineer in Smithfield, and at the end of his apprenticeship, became an assistant to Henry R. Palmer, Engineer to the London Docks, at a time when extensive additions were being made.

In 1829, he became the Engineer to the East London Waterworks Company. In 1835 his attention was directed to the Cornish engine as a replacement for the less economical condensing engine. He visited the Cornish mines, conducted experiments, and prevailed upon the directors of the company to invest in this new technology. In 1837 an engine from Cornwall was installed in the works at Old Ford. He carried out measurements for a year and published his findings in 1841 in a paper entitled "An Experimental Inquiry concerning the relative power of, and useful effect produced by, the Cornish and Boulton and Watt pumping-engines, and cylindrical and waggon-head boilers" read to the Institution of Civil Engineers. Following this, several large engines were installed under his direction by various water companies around London (between 1838 and 1845, in addition to his work with the East London, he served as Consulting Engineer to the Grand Junction, Southwark, Vauxhall and Kent Waterworks Companies).

He became Engineer to the London Sewage Company in 1847. Plans for a sewer along the North bank of the Thames to a pumping station and reservoir at Barking Creek were prepared to put before Parliament on behalf of the company, but necessary investment was not forthcoming and the company was subsequently dissolved. His plan was similar to that which he had proposed for Berlin in 1841, and he then built a system at Leicester. With the aim of purifying the sewage of towns, and producing manure, he set up the Patent Solid Sewage Manure Company. At this point he resigned as Engineer to the East London Waterworks in 1851 and severed his connections with the other London companies.

He was elected a Member of the Institution of Civil Engineers on 7 February 1837 and contributed several papers on the Cornish engine, for which he received a Telford medal in 1839. He had a seat on the Council from 1840 to 1843, but for many years before his death he had ceased to attend the meetings and to take part in the discussions. In 1863 he was elected also to the Institution of Mechanical Engineers.

== Personal life ==
On 20 July 1829, he married Eliza, by whom he had six children.

His health was adversely affected by his labours in Leicester, and in 1865, he had what was described at the time as a slight attack of paralysis, and retired. He died at Headingley, near Leeds, on 15 November 1871, aged 65.
