= Metropolitan Water Board Railway =

Coordinates: 51°25′33″N 0°24′27″W

Overview
- Headquarters: London
- Locale: England
- Dates of operation: 1916–1946 (short section of track now re-opened, possibility of restoring the remainder)
- Successor: abandoned

Technical
- Track gauge: 2 ft (610 mm)
- Length: 3 miles (4.8 km)

The Metropolitan Water Board Railway was a 2 ft (610 mm) narrow gauge industrial railway built to serve the Metropolitan Water Board's pumping station at Kempton Park near London. The line was opened in 1916 to deliver coal to the pumping engines and closed shortly after the Second World War. A short part is operating once again to give rides to the public, under a new name, the Kempton Steam Railway

== History ==
In 1903, three private water companies in and around London came under the control of the newly formed Metropolitan Water Board. Included was the pumping station at Kempton, three miles (4.8 km) from the River Thames at Hampton. The Kempton engine houses contained a set of massive steam engines that drove the pumps which together consumed about 110 tons of coal a day. The cost of transporting and handling this amount of coal from the wharves at Hampton to the Kempton pumping station was significant.

A narrow gauge railway was proposed to ease the cost of supplying the Kempton engines. Construction had begun by May 1914 and by the end of 1915 the railway was ready to be opened.

Coal was brought to Hampton by barge, loaded into a large hopper by a high level crane, and then taken by the railway, in tipper wagons, to the pumping houses.

Motive power was provided by three steam locomotives, built by Kerr Stuart & Co Ltd. These were 0-4-2T side-tank engines, named: Hampton, Kempton and Sunbury. They were painted a lined dark green livery, with much polished brasswork, including the prominent dome cover. Photographs indicate that the engines were maintained in immaculate condition.

The railway fulfilled its function until after the Second World War when, after a working life of 32 years, the quantity of coal transported fell dramatically and it was decided to shut the railway down. The locomotives were scrapped and most of the track was removed in 1947, although some was covered over to form a new roadway and is still in situ in 2006.

== Restoration as attraction ==
The Metropolitan Water Board Railway Society was formed with a view to the complete restoration of the line, to provide a visitor attraction. A 300-yard (274 m) section of the new railway in the form of a continuous loop, the Kempton Steam Railway, is open for rides, and is an extra attraction for visitors to the Kempton Great Engines. A steam locomotive, "Darent", (built by Andrew Barclay Sons & Co. in 1903) is on loan, and two diesels have been purchased. A new bogie carriage body has been constructed on an underframe bought from the Devon Railway Centre and a 4-wheeled carriage from the same source is being rebuilt.

Access to the three-mile-long (4.8 km) former trackbed is actively being negotiated, and in the meantime, the first section of track is open and giving rides to the public on summer Sundays and selected other dates.

== Kew Bridge Steam Museum ==
The historic steam pumping station and museum at Kew Bridge features an extensive display of photographs and some artefacts from the Metropolitan Water Board Railway. The museum's own steam railway, the only other one in the London area with locos as large as Kempton Steam Railway, was inspired by the Hampton to Kempton Park line, incorporating some recovered parts of the original trackwork. The Kew museum supported the Kempton Steam Railway restoration project, lending one of their steam locomotives during 2013.

== See also ==
- Kempton Steam Railway
- British industrial narrow gauge railways
- Kempton Park Steam Engines
- Kew Bridge Steam Museum
