= Cricklewood Pumping Station =

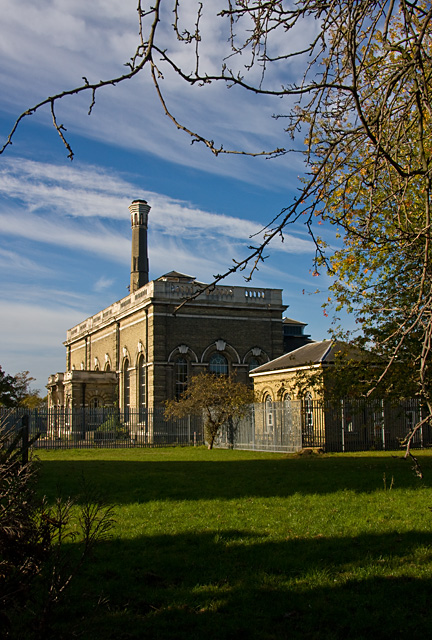
- Cricklewood Pumping Station

- Location within London Borough of Brent
- 51°33′31″N 0°13′37″W
- Type: Water pumping station
- Location: St Michael's Road, Cricklewood
- OS grid reference: TQ 23002 85893

History
- Built: 1905

Site notes
- Area: London Borough of Brent
- Owner: Thames Water

Cricklewood Pumping Station was built in 1905 to supply water to London's north west suburbs. It is situated at the eastern extremity of Gladstone Park, Cricklewood and is a locally listed building.

== History ==
By 1900, about half of the sixty acre estate that had belonged to local industrialist George Furness had been built on by housing developers. It was around this time that the New River Company bought some of the land for water works. The pumping station was responsible for providing water from the River Thames to London's expanding suburbs, some as far away as Hampstead and Hendon, where it was stored in reservoirs including those in Golders Green and Muswell Hill.

In the Willesden area, the West Middlesex Waterworks Company supplied water to homes until 1903 when the Metropolitan Water Board took over. The Metropolitan Water Board had reservoirs at Harlesden Road and one at St. Michael's Road, Cricklewood, the same road as the pumping station.

Starting in 1908, water arrived at Cricklewood from the new water works at Kempton Park. Two triple-expansion steam engines would pump 15 million imperial gallons (68,000 m^{3}) of water per day through a 42-inch (110 cm) diameter main to Cricklewood. From there, three Lilleshall steam engines would pump the water further to the reservoir at Fortis Green near Muswell Hill.

Cricklewood Pumping Station was coal-fired until the 1950s and the distinctive 135-foot (41 m) chimney was used to discharge smoke. By the late 1950s, the station had converted to electric power, rendering the chimney obsolete. In 1987, the station attained notoriety when a pipe burst leaving the surrounding streets so badly flooded that residents had to be evacuated.

== Current Use ==
In 1978, Cricklewood Pumping Station became the Cricklewood works of the Thames Water Authority, now Thames Water, and remains in use today. The defunct chimney has found a new lease of life as a mobile phone mast.

== Popular culture ==
The interior of Cricklewood Pumping Station was used as a double for the Titanic's engine rooms in the Kenneth More film A Night to Remember.

The station was the eponymous setting of Chapter 8 of book four of the Belinda Blinked series and subsequently Season 4 Episode 8 of the podcast, My Dad Wrote a Porno.
