= Cricklewood =

Town in North West London, England

Coordinates: 51.5578°N 0.2144°W

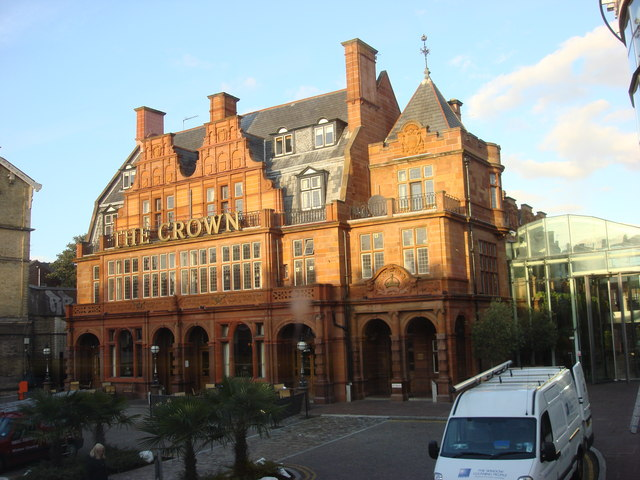
- Clayton Crown Hotel, Cricklewood

- Location within Greater London
- OS grid reference: TQ235855
- London borough: Barnet; Brent; Camden
- Ceremonial county: Greater London
- Region: London
- Country: England
- Sovereign state: United Kingdom
- Post town: LONDON
- Postcode district: NW2 NW6
- Dialling code: 020
- Police: Metropolitan
- Fire: London
- Ambulance: London
- UK Parliament: Brent East; Finchley and Golders Green; Hampstead and Highgate
- London Assembly: Barnet and Camden; Brent and Harrow

Cricklewood is a town in North West London, England, in the London Boroughs of Barnet and Brent. The Crown pub, now the Clayton Crown Hotel, is a local landmark and lies 5 miles (8 km) north-west of Charing Cross.

Cricklewood was a small rural hamlet around Edgware Road, the Roman road which was later called Watling Street and which forms the boundary of the two boroughs that share Cricklewood. The area urbanised after the arrival of the surface and underground railways in nearby Willesden Green in the 1870s. The shops on Cricklewood Broadway, as Edgware Road is known here, contrast with quieter surrounding streets of largely late-Victorian, Edwardian, and 1930s housing. The area has strong links with Ireland due to a sizeable Irish population. The 35-hectare (86-acre) Gladstone Park lies on the area's western periphery.

Cricklewood has two conservation areas, the Mapesbury Estate and the Cricklewood Railway Terraces, and in 2012 was awarded £1.65 million from the Mayor of London's office to improve the area.

The town is also famous due to it being where The Goodies business is based.

== History ==
=== Origin and setting ===
The small settlement at the junction of Cricklewood Lane and the Edgware Road was established by 1294, which by 1321 was called Cricklewood. The settlement took its name from a nearby wood, perhaps on Cricklewood Lane, in Hendon. The name of the wood may be a tautology meaning "hill hill wood", with the Common Brittonic word cruc (meaning hill) forming the first element, and the Old English hyll (also meaning hill) the second element.

The area of the hamlet east of Watling street was in the Ancient Parish of Hendon (now part of Barnet), and the area to the west was in the Ancient Parish of Willesden (now part of Brent).

By the 1750s the Crown (rebuilt in 1889) was providing for coach travellers, and by the 1800s it had a handful of cottages and Cricklewood House as neighbours, and was known for its pleasure gardens. By the 1860s there were a number of substantial villas along the Edgware Road starting with Rockhall Lodge.

=== Urban development east of Edgware Road ===
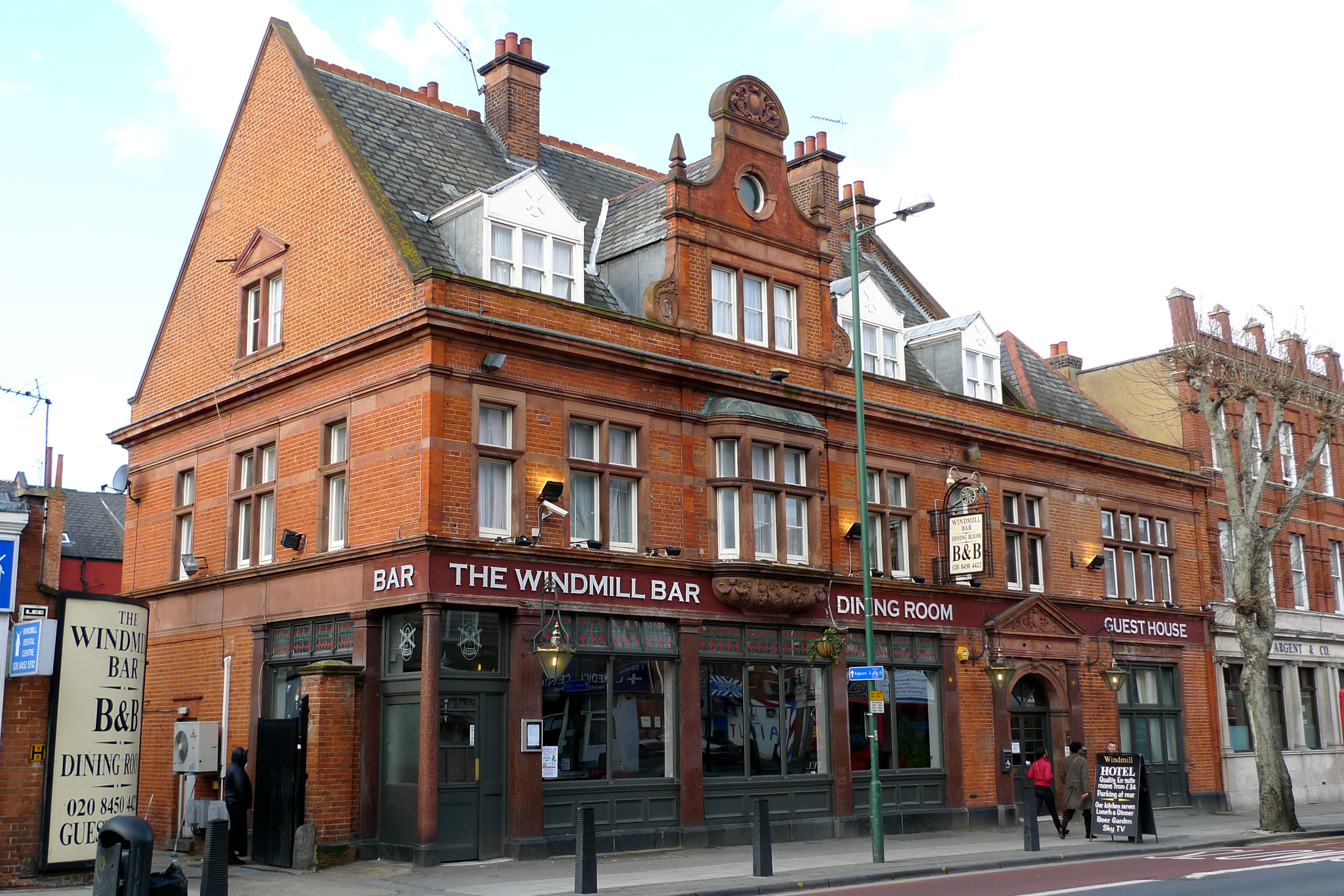
Windmill Bar, Cricklewood

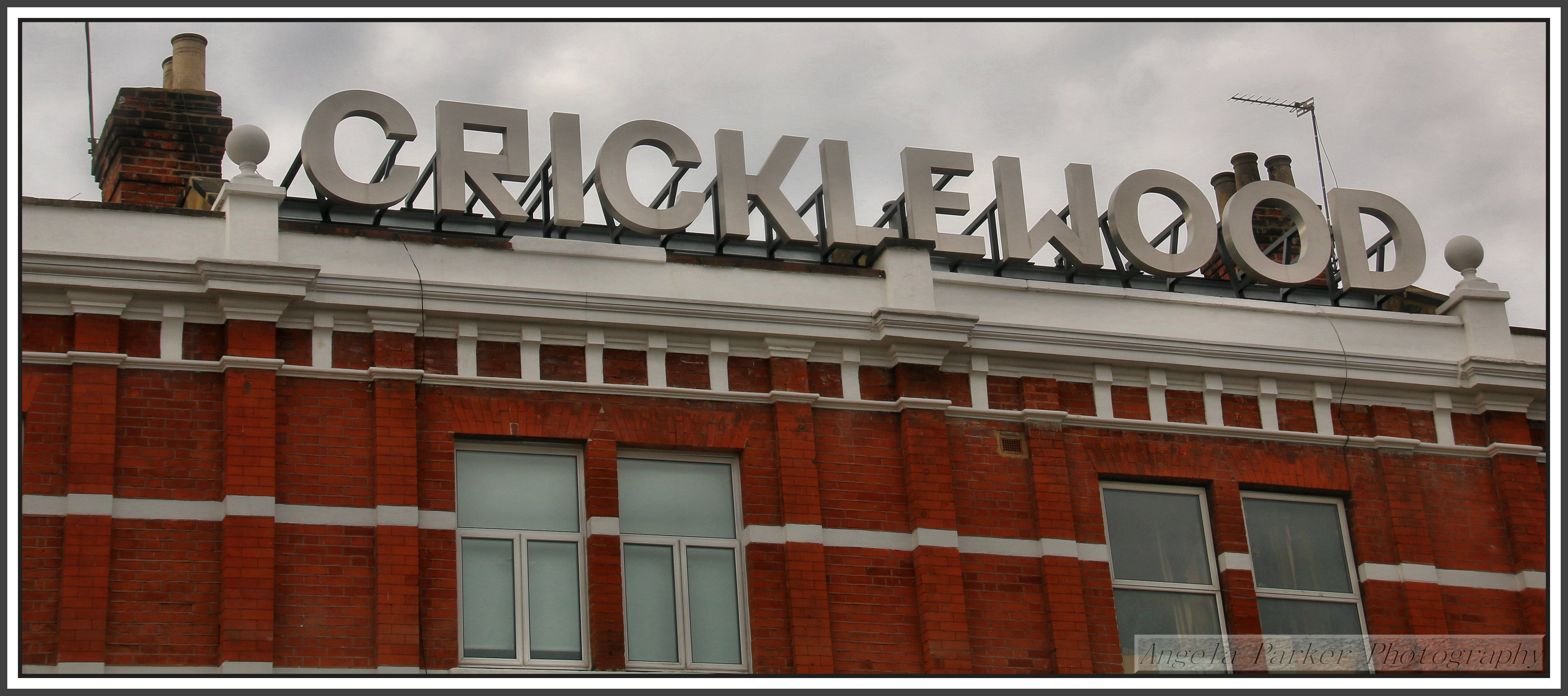
"Cricklewood" sign above retail building

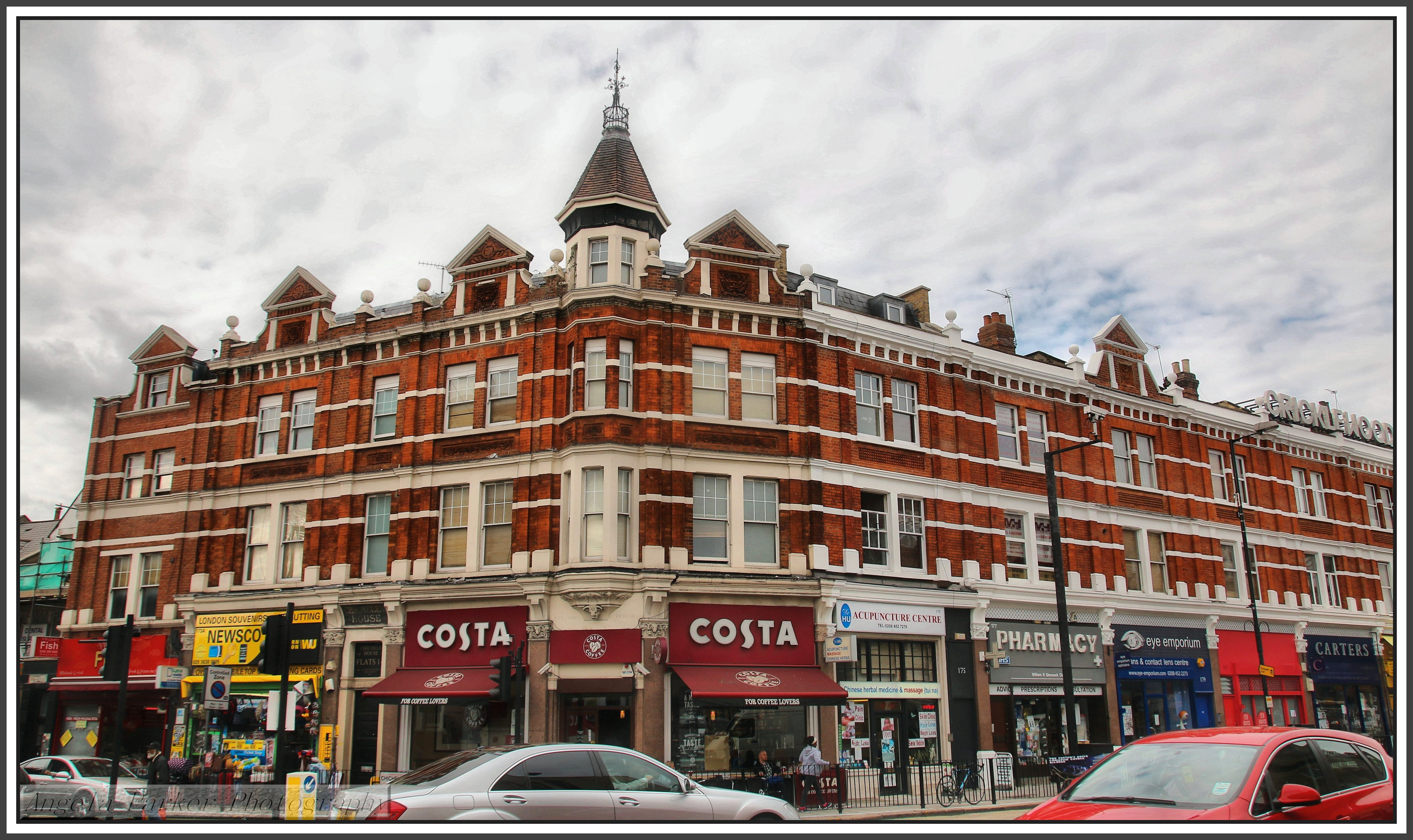
Cricklewood Broadway

Childs Hill and Cricklewood station, later renamed Cricklewood, opened in 1868. In the summer of 1881, the Midland Railway Company relocated its locomotive works from Kentish Town to the new Brent sidings. That October, the company announced it would build worker housing, which later became the now-listed Railway Cottages. Mr H. Finch laid out a handful of streets directly behind the Crown Inn, (including Yew, Ash and Elm Groves) in 1880. The station had become the terminus for the Midland Railway suburban services by 1884. The census of 1881 showed that the population had grown enough for a new church, and St. Peter's replaced a tin chapel in 1891. A daughter church called Little St. Peter's was opened in 1958 on Claremont Way but closed in 1983. The parish church on Cricklewood Lane was demolished and rebuilt in the 1970s. This church building was closed in 2004. Services for Anglicans were then held in the Carey Hall on Claremont Road (which is the church hall of Claremont Free Church) but were discontinued there in December 2015. The London General Omnibus Company commenced services to Regent Street from the Crown in 1883, and in 1899 opened a bus garage (Garage code W), which is still in use and was completely rebuilt in 2010.

By the 1890s, houses and shops had been built along part of Cricklewood Lane. Cricklewood Broadway had become a retail area by 1900 replacing the Victorian villas. The Queens Hall Cinema, later the Gaumont, replaced Rock Hall House, and was itself demolished in 1960. Thorverton, Caddington and Dersingham Roads were laid out in 1907, the year of the opening of Golders Green Underground station.

Cowhouse Farm, latterly Dicker's Farm and finally Avenue Farm, was closed in 1932. From 1908 to 1935, Westcroft Farm was owned by the Home of Rest for Horses; at its peak it could house 250 horses. The Metropolitan Borough of Hampstead opened the Westcroft Estate in 1935.

=== Urban development west of Edgware Road ===
Much of the land to the west of Edgware Road was part of the estate of All Souls College, Oxford. Much of the land was wooded and in 1662 there were 79 oaks in Cricklewood. The transformation of the area came with the opening of the underground station in Willesden Green in 1879, which was known as Willesden Green and Cricklewood station from 1894 to 1938.

A number of developers acquired land in the area and built houses in the 1890s and 1900s. George Furness laid out what he called Cricklewood Park between 1893 and 1900 on Clock Farm. Roads in the area are named after trees (Pine, Larch, Cedar, Ivy, Olive). The name Cricklewood Park is no longer used. To the south of this, Henry Corsellis built Rockhall, Oaklands and Howard Roads from 1894; at the time he was also building in the Lavender Hill and Clapham Common area in Wandsworth. All Souls' College built a group of roads named after fellows of the college; for example, Chichele Road is named after Henry Chichele, founder of All Souls' College. Further expansion westward was blocked by the Dollis Hill estate, which became a public park, Gladstone Park, in 1901. To the north of Furness's Cricklewood Park Estate, Earl Temple built Temple Road by 1906 and surrounding roads. To the south, the Mapesbury Estate was built mainly between 1895 and 1905 and is a Conservation Area of largely semi-detached and detached houses.

=== Industrial history ===
With the introduction of the tram system in 1904, and the motorisation of bus services by 1911, numerous important industries were established. The first of these was the Phoenix Telephone Company in 1911 (later moved to the Hyde). The Handley Page Aircraft Company soon followed, from 1912 until 1917, at 110 Cricklewood Lane and subsequently occupying a large part of Claremont Road. The Cricklewood Aerodrome adjacent to their factory was used for the first London-Paris air service in the 1920s.

The former aircraft factory was converted into Cricklewood Studios in 1920, the largest film studio in the country at the time. It became the production base for Stoll Pictures during the silent era. After later turning out a number of quota quickies, it closed down in 1938. Some years later, the property was redeveloped and currently hosts a Wickes DIY store.

A number of plans were drawn up around the turn of the 20th century to extend the developing London Underground network to Cricklewood. Several proposals were put forward to construct an underground railway tunnel under the length of the Edgware Road, including an unusual scheme to build a type of subterranean monorail roller-coaster, but these proposals were abandoned.

Cricklewood was home to Smith's Industries. This started in 1915 as S. Smith & Sons, on the Edgware Road, established to manufacture fuses, instruments and accessories. By 1939 it was making electrical motors, aircraft accessories and electric clocks. The large advertisement on the iron railway bridge over the Broadway next to the bus garage became a familiar landmark for decades. As the company grew it acquired other companies and sites overseas but Cricklewood remained the most important site, with 8,000 employees between 1937 and 1978. Coincidentally, Cricklewood also became the home for the first Smith's Crisps potato crisp factory, which replaced the omnibus depot at Crown Yard. Having moved into new premises in Cricklewood Lane, the yard was taken over by Clang Electrical Goods Ltd. From 1929 to 1933 the area was finally built over. Bentley Motors, builders of racing and sports cars, built a factory at Oxgate Lane in 1920, and Cricklewood remained the company's headquarters until it was bought out by Rolls-Royce in 1931.

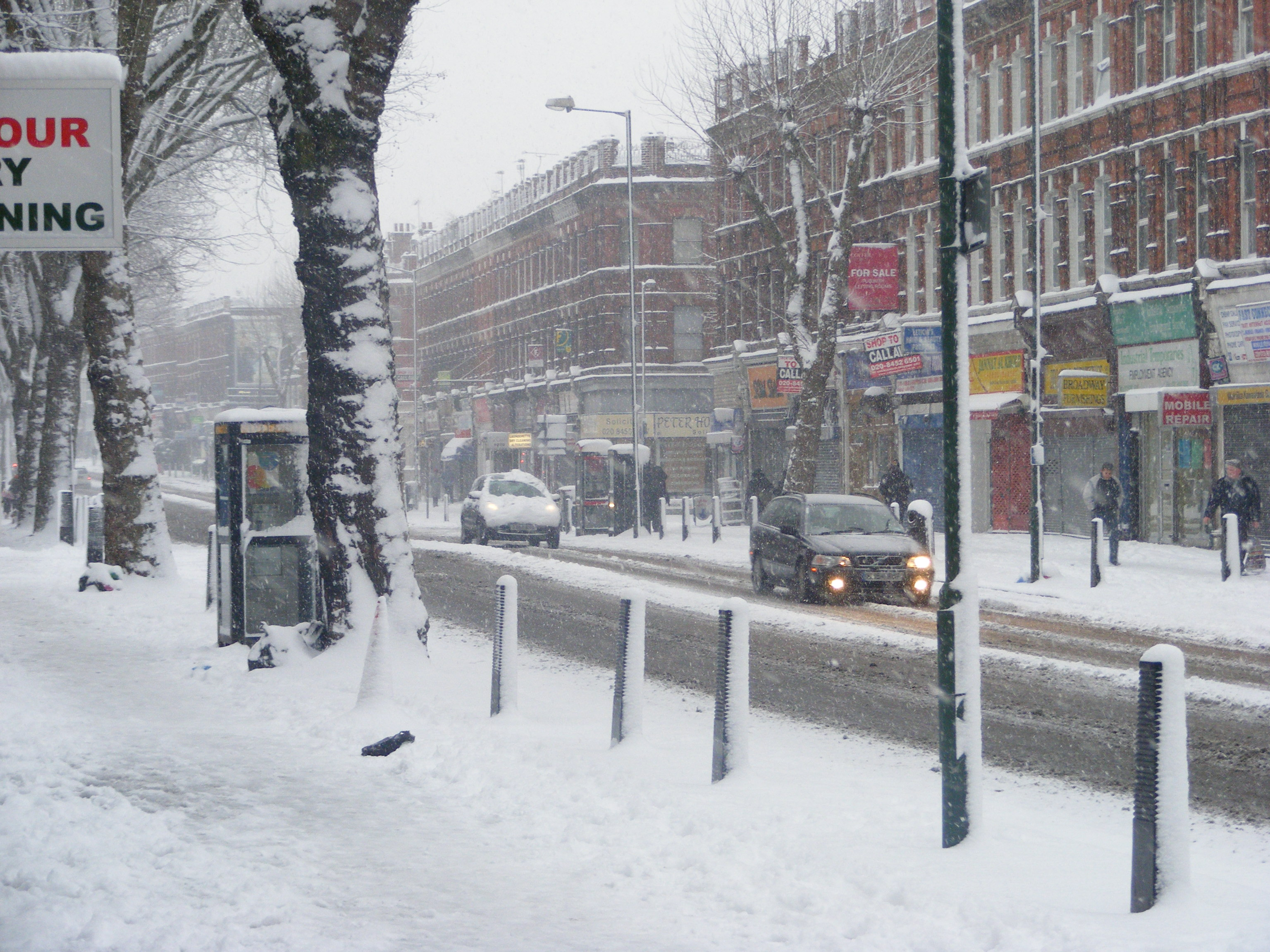
Cricklewood Broadway in the snow, February 2009

The headquarters of Dubreq, the manufacturers of the Stylophone, was located at Stylophone House at 120-132 Cricklewood Lane, where some three million units were manufactured during its original run after it entered production in 1968 – as demonstrated by Rolf Harris.

From the 1960s, industry in the local area went into decline, and all the above-mentioned businesses have since left. One company, however, bucked this trend, and for twenty-five years Cricklewood played a major if little-publicised role in the British film industry, when, in July 1963, Samuelson Film Service Ltd. moved into Samcine House, located at 303-315 Cricklewood Broadway. This company, with a staff of close to 300 people, operated a twenty-four-hours a day, seven days a week service, providing camera, sound and audio-visual equipment for feature films, television dramas and television commercials. At one time Samuelson’s was the largest film camera rental company in the world, also maintaining branches in Paris (Sam Alga), Johannesburg (Samuelson Genop) and Sydney (Samuelson Film Service Australia Pty Ltd); in 1965 Samuelson’s also became the official Panavision agent for Europe.

In 1979 Samuelson’s began work on constructing The Production Village, located at 100 Cricklewood Lane, formerly the site of the Clang Electrical Company from 1929 to the mid-1970s. The Production Village was a purpose-built studio facility with nine stages (R thru Z), including cutting rooms and production offices. Most of the stages were relatively small, primarily intended for the commercials market, although some feature films would still be based there, including Breaking Glass (1980), starring Hazel O'Connor, Phil Daniels, Jon Finch and Jonathan Pryce, and Hellraiser (1987). Also located in the Production Village was the "Magic Hour" pub and the "Hog’s Grunt", where Freddie Mercury apparently once gave an impromptu rendition of "Jailhouse Rock".

In 1987 the Samuelson Brothers (David, Sydney, Michael and Tony) sold their shares in the Samuelson Group of companies to Eagle Trust PLC, a prominent UK-based industrial and television conglomerate, at which point the company’s presence in Cricklewood started to wind down. The Production Village was sold that same year to Bass Taverns, and was subsequently used as a live music venue, until it was demolished in 2000 to make way for a Virgin Active Gym, later becoming a David Lloyd Gym in 2022.

In 1988 Samuelson Film Service moved to a new purpose-built industrial unit in Greenford, although Michael Samuelson maintained the family’s connection with the film industry by organising a successful management buyout of the company’s film lighting division. This company continued to operate out of its existing location in nearby Dudden Hill Lane, before moving to Pinewood Studios in 1998. Samuelson Film Service would continue to trade for a further nine years, but following the collapse of Eagle Trust, in 1997, the company was bought out and absorbed by Panavision Europe. The Samcine House building, however, is still standing, and is currently divided into the Space Station Self Storage facility and The Manor Health and Leisure Club.

In June 2001, a lynx was captured in Cricklewood after 10 years of sightings by residents. The animal was originally nicknamed the "Beast of Barnet" by the local press following numerous sightings of a similarly sized animal around south Hertfordshire and the fringes of north London. A senior veterinary officer for the London Zoological Society arrived with the task of sedating the beast using a tranquilliser gun. It is believed that someone was keeping the animal illegally and it had escaped. The lynx was taken to London Zoo and named Lara.

=== Recent developments ===
Brent Cross Cricklewood, a £4.5 billion regeneration scheme for Cricklewood, Brent Cross and West Hendon was approved in October 2010, and was expected to start in 2014. A new Brent Cross Thameslink station, for 12-car trains, is planned, and for that reason the planned lengthening of Cricklewood station platforms, from 8 to 12-cars, has been abandoned. West Hendon is now being dealt with separately. This is currently the largest planned development scheme in London.

The approval was delayed for several years as there were views for and against the proposals. These developments were reported in the media.

In April 2009, the London Borough of Camden decided to oppose the application. In May 2009, the London Borough of Brent concluded, although without widespread public pronouncement, that the developers needed to apply for planning permission from Brent as well as from Barnet, because of various road changes that spilled over on to Brent land. On 15 September 2009, Barnet recommended approval of the application, in a report to its 23 September Planning Committee, later postponed to 20 October. The issue was reported by local media, and was taken up by the national media.

== Attractions and amenities ==
The Mapesbury Dell on Hoveden Road is a small park and garden administered by local residents. It started in 2000 when local residents in conjunction with the Mapesbury Residents Association decided that their local green space was too valuable to leave to fortune. The dell is open to the public during daylight hours and is used throughout the year, for example hosting carol services in mid-December.

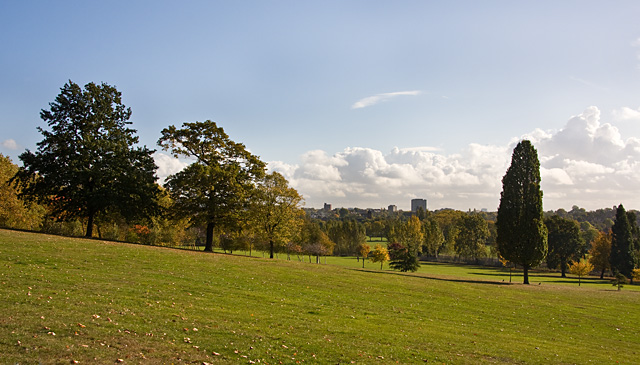
Gladstone Park in autumn

Gladstone Park marks the north-western edge, covering approximately 35 hectares (86 acres). In 2003–04, Gladstone Park features and facilities were improved/restored with the aid of Heritage Lottery funding. The park contains a well maintained formal garden, children's playground, art gallery, café and pond, as well as good sport facilities (football/rugby/cricket pitches and tennis and netball courts). Barring fog and rain its peak gives good views of Wembley Stadium, the London Eye and the Shard. The park was frequented by Mark Twain around the turn of the 20th century whilst staying in accompanying Dollis Hill House, about which altogether he said he had "never seen any place that was so satisfactorily situated, with its noble trees and stretch of country, and everything that went to make life delightful, and all within a biscuit's throw of the metropolis of the world".

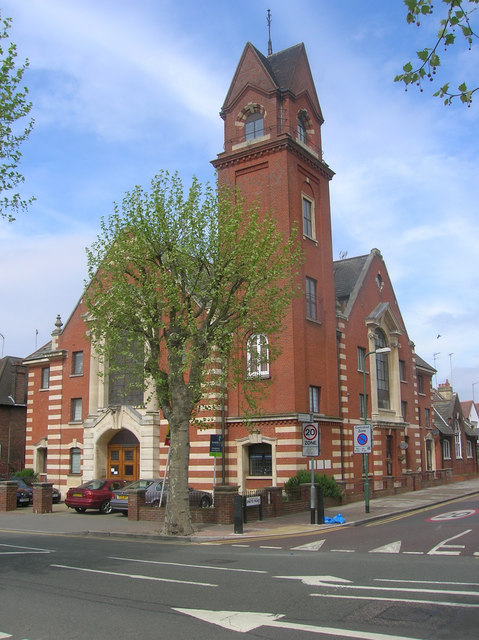
Cricklewood Baptist Church

The historic Crown pub is a terracotta, grade two listed Victorian building on Cricklewood Broadway, built by the architects Shoebridge & Rising in 1899. It was fully restored in 2003, and reopened as the Crown Moran Hotel and with the addition of a 152-room 4 star hotel and restaurant (Kitchen at the Crown). Later, the hotel was renamed the Clayton Crown Hotel. The building style has been described as: "Free Flemish Renaissance, with two stepped and voluted gables in front of a slate mansard roof, a battlement turret at one end. Plentiful terracotta ornament; four handsome cast-iron lamp standards in front."

Another notable local building is the Cricklewood Baptist Church on Anson Road at the Junction with Sneyd Road. The church was built in 1907 of red and yellow brick in the Italian Byzantine style. Other local churches include St Gabriel's Church on Walm Lane; Claremont Free Church on Cheviot Gardens/Claremont Road built in 1931; and St. Agnes' Roman Catholic Church built in 1883 on Cricklewood Lane. St. Agnes' Catholic Primary school is next door and both cater for the large Catholic population of the area.

Cricklewood Pumping Station, built in 1905, is another distinctive building, the interior of which was used as a film location for the Titanic engine room sequences of the 1958 Rank Organisation film A Night to Remember.

== Local groups and associations ==
In June 2012, Cricklewood Town Team was awarded £1.67 million from the Mayor of London's Outer London Fund to boost the local high street, deliver growth, new jobs and improve lives. In addition to physical improvements to the area the funds also enabled the running costs of the annual summer and pre-Christmas winter festivals until 2017. The OMG comedy club was inaugurated at the same time to contribute to the local cultural scene.

There are several residents' associations in the area: the NorthWestTwo Residents Association, the Mapesbury Residents Association, the Groves Residents Association and the Railway Cottages Association. A group of local artists set up a group called Creative Cricklewood. The Clitterhouse Farm Project are a local group working to save and restore the historic Clitterhouse Farm outbuildings on the corner of Clitterhouse Playing Fields on Claremont Road as a resource for promoting culture and community in a sustainable society.

== Transport ==
=== Thameslink stations ===
Cricklewood station in Zone 3 is the nearest main-line station with Thameslink services to St Pancras, home of Eurostar since 2007, in approximately 10 minutes, Farringdon station in 16 minutes and Luton Airport in 35 minutes. There is a railway complex and sidings to the north of the station.

Brent Cross West station opened in late 2023 in the north of the area and provides Thameslink services.

=== Tube Stations ===
Willesden Green and Kilburn stations, both on the Jubilee line in Zone 2, lie within a 15-minute walk from Cricklewood Broadway. There are services to Baker Street in 11 minutes and Westminster in 17 minutes.

=== Railway station ===
Brondesbury station in Zone 2 on the London Overground also lies within 15 minutes walk of the Broadway, with services to Hampstead Heath in 6 minutes.

=== Road ===
Cricklewood Broadway, the main north–south road through the area, is part of Edgware Road, leading directly to Marble Arch, which is between Oxford Street and Hyde Park.

=== Bus ===
The area has a bus garage (Garage code W), completely rebuilt in 2010 and so many bus routes start or run through the area. There are frequent services to Paddington, Acton High Street, Oxford Street, Brent Cross and Golders Green, among other destinations.

== Politics ==
Cricklewood is part of the Cricklewood ward for elections to Barnet London Borough Council.

== Notable residents ==
- Elizabeth Adare – television actress in The Tomorrow People
- Emma Anderson – guitarist and songwriter of indie music bands Lush and Sing-Sing
- Tim Brooke-Taylor – television actor in The Goodies, formerly lived here
- Jamie Cho – actor
- Alan Coren – writer and satirist, who "...did for the unprepossessing north London suburb of Cricklewood what Hardy did for Wessex – if rather less reverently"
- Nick Frost – actor and comedian, lived here in the early 1990s.
- Tamsin Greig – actress, was brought up in Exeter Road, near Kilburn tube station.
- Ching He Huang – TV chef
- Dave Kaye – pianist, lived in Cricklewood
- Shaun Keaveny – BBC Radio 6 Music DJ and comedian.
- Elihu Lauterpacht – academic, lawyer, and founder of the Centre for International Law at Cambridge University.
- Ken Livingstone – former Mayor of London, resides on the Brent side of Cricklewood.
- Phil Lynott – lead singer of Thin Lizzy, lived in Cricklewood in the late 1970s.
- Penelope Mortimer – novelist, lived on the Mapesbury Estate in her latter years.
- Róisín Murphy – musician (since 2006)
- Jimmy Nail – television actor in Auf Wiedersehen, Pet.
- Dennis Nilsen – serial killer who killed his victims in Cricklewood and Muswell Hill.
- Peter O'Toole – actor
- Simon Pegg – actor and comedian, lived in Cricklewood in the early 1990s where he met long-term comedy partner Nick Frost.
- Oliver Sacks (1933–2015) – neurologist and author, was brought up in a house on the corner of Exeter and Mapesbury Roads (at 37 Mapesbury Road) where his father Samuel Sacks was a GP, and his mother Elsie Sacks was a surgeon – one of the first female surgeons in Britain; remarkably, "Sammy" Sacks continued to practise medicine, mostly at 37 Mapesbury Road, until shortly before his death at the age of 82.
- Zadie Smith – author of White Teeth, grew up in Cricklewood.
- Dean Stalham - artist, grew up in Cricklewood.
- Philip Sugden – historian of the Whitechapel Murders, lived in Cricklewood in 1974–76.
- Marti Webb – musical theatre actress, singer and dancer

== Films made at Cricklewood Studios ==
Films made at Cricklewood Studios (as distinct from the spoof Cricklewood Film Studios of Peter Capaldi's Cricklewood Greats) include

- 1927: Huntingtower directed by George Pearson

and others listed at Cricklewood Studios films.
