= Woolwich Arsenal =

Woolwich may refer to:

- Royal Arsenal, Woolwich - originally known as the Woolwich Warren, carried out armaments manufacture, ammunition proofing and explosives research for British armed forces. It was sited on the south bank of the River Thames in south-east London.
  - Royal Arsenal Railway, the railway system serving the Royal Arsenal
  - Woolwich Arsenal station, the railway and DLR station, in Woolwich
  - Woolwich Arsenal Pier
- Arsenal F.C., until 1914 known as Woolwich Arsenal, an association football club in north London
