= Royal Arsenal Railway =

Coordinates: 51.4931°N 0.0743°E

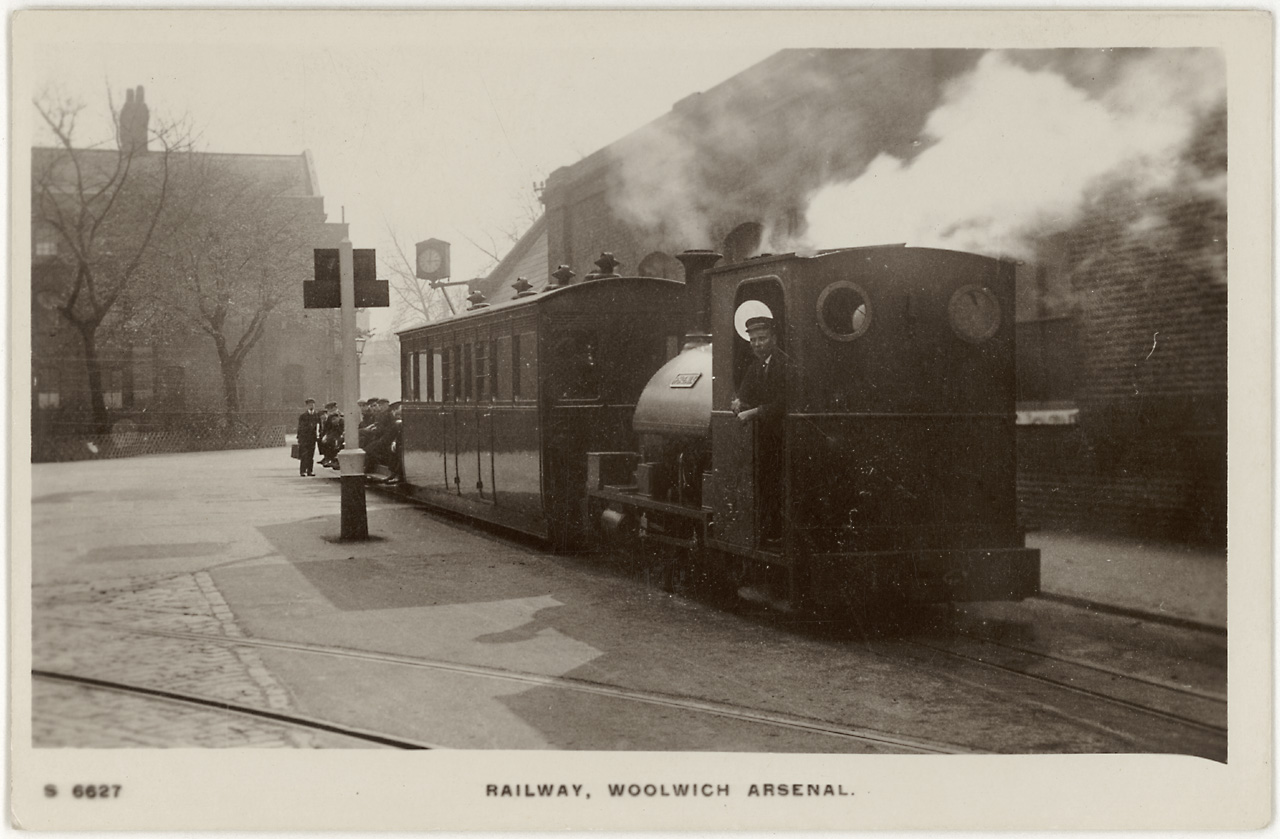
A train on the Royal Arsenal Railway

The Royal Arsenal Railway was a private military railway which operated inside the Royal Arsenal, Woolwich, southeast London.

== Introduction ==
The earliest parts of this railway system proper were constructed to standard gauge from 1859 onwards to replace an ad hoc arrangement of individual plateways. Laying of plateways had started in 1824 and was completed by 1854–1855; they then came under the control of the Corps of Royal Engineers. From 1871 onwards some of the track was constructed as 18 in (457 mm) gauge and it comprised some 50 to 60 miles (80 to 97 km) of track. It ran in some form from 1871 until much of it was abandoned after the First World War. The remains of the system continued in use until after the Second World War, with the final trains running in 1966.

Parts of the 18 in gauge track were built as dual-gauge track, with the outer rails gauged to standard gauge; other parts of the site were only served by standard-gauge track. Some 120 miles (190 km) of mixed or purely standard-gauge track existed by 1918. Some 1 ft 11 1/2 in (597 mm) narrow-gauge track existed at the site.

== Early plateways ==
The challenge of moving materials and people through the Royal Arsenal was recognised in the early 19th. century. In 1812 a canal was added to provide transport around the site. On 14 May 1824, the first plateway was approved at a cost of £459. The plateway proved successful and further extensions were gradually added. The last of these was approved on 23 August 1854, when £1920 was spent.

== The 18 in gauge railway ==
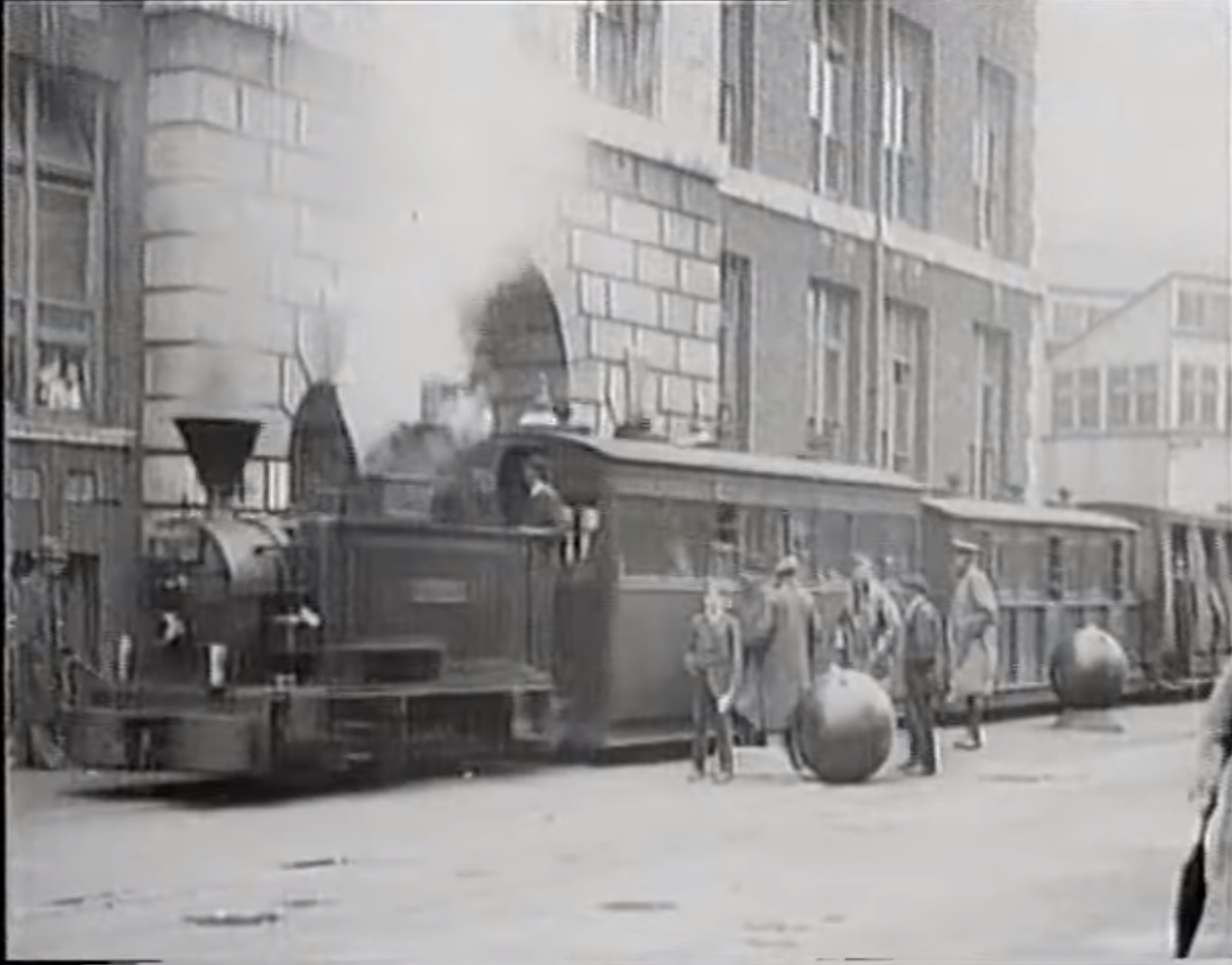
Narrow-gauge railway at Woolwich Arsenal, 1914-1918

=== History and use ===
Construction of an 18 in (457 mm) gauge railway was approved in 1866. The Crimean War had caused a major increase in ammunition production and the railway was needed to move materiel around the site. The railway was based on the Crewe Works Railway which had been operating since 1862 inside the London and North Western Railway's Crewe Works.

Construction of the Royal Arsenal's narrow-gauge railway began in 1871. although it was not officially opened until 10 January 1873. The railway provided for the movement of both goods and passengers within the Royal Arsenal. This system, along with a similar one operated by the Admiralty at Chatham Dockyard, were important proving grounds for the 'mainstream' outside framed narrow-gauge steam locomotive as exemplified in particular by the pioneering '6-inch by 8-inch' Manning Wardle 0-4-0ST locomotives used at both sites.

During the 1870s and 1880s further 18-inch (457 mm) gauge steam locomotives arrived at Woolwich from Vulcan Foundry and Hudswell Clarke whilst experiments were carried out under the direction of Lt. Col. F.E. Beaumont into the development of compressed air motive power for rail usage on both main gauges of the Arsenal's railway system. The system's passenger service for workmen also probably began during the 1880s initially using simple 'knifeboard' carriages inspired by vehicles used in Chatham dockyard and by the Royal Engineers. The 1890s saw further steam locomotives added, mainly of the 0-4-2T configuration built for the abortive Suakin-Berber campaign.

In 1896, internal combustion locomotives were introduced. The first of these, Lachesis, was the second internal combustion locomotive built in Britain, and likely the third anywhere in the world. It was in any case the first truly successful internal combustion locomotive.

The period from 1900 to 1916 saw the 18 inch gauge system grow become the most extensive locomotive-worked narrow-gauge railway on the British mainland. Between 1919 and 1933, various locomotives were advertised for sale. Some of the dual-gauge track was removed at the same time. However five new narrow-gauge locomotives were bought between 1934 and 1941; and a final one from Hunslet Engine Company in 1954. The remaining narrow-gauge lines finally closed in 1966.

=== Rolling stock ===
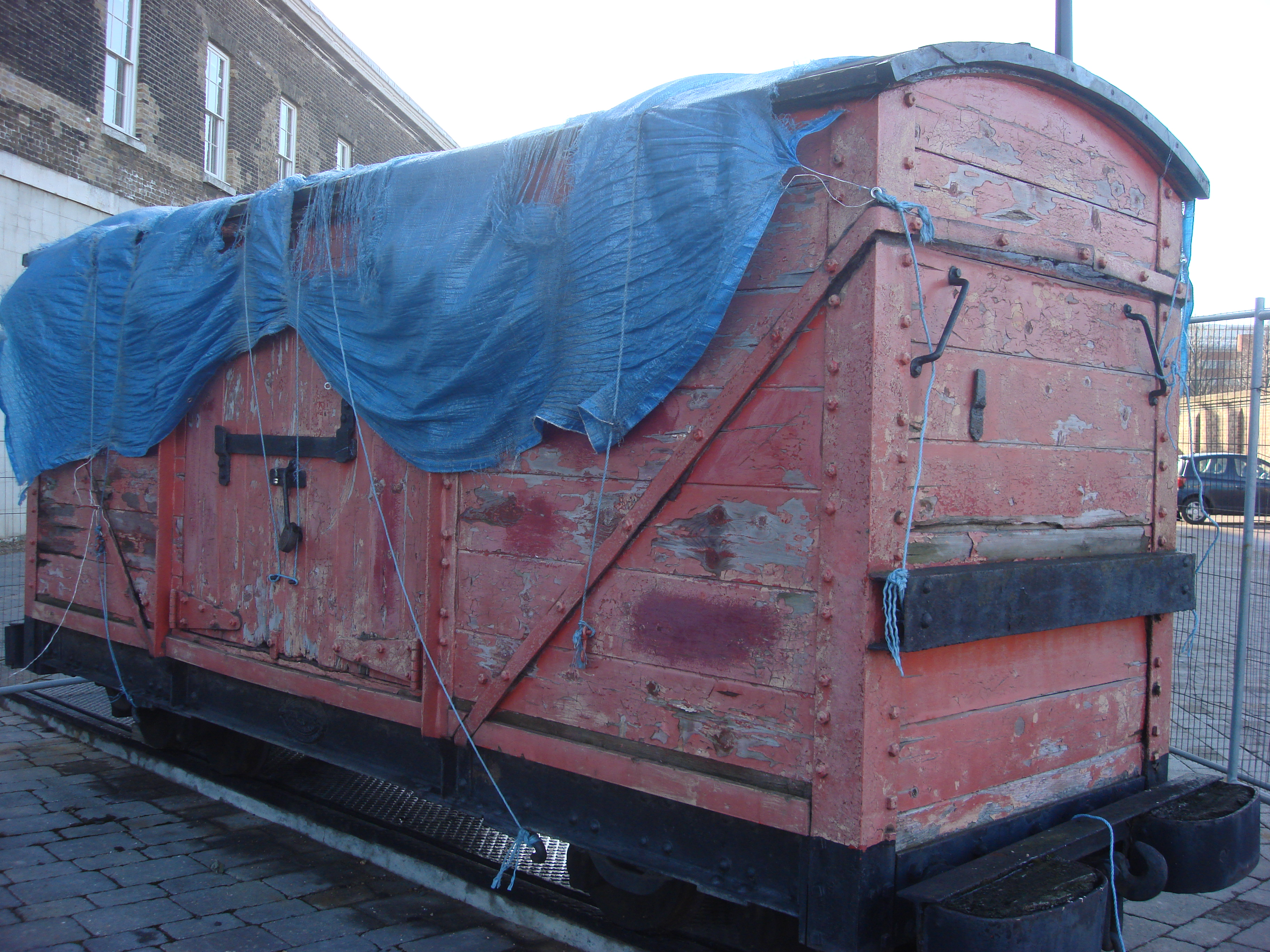
Explosives wagon of the Royal Arsenal Railway, previously on display at North Woolwich Old Station Museum, at the Royal Arsenal site near the Heritage Centre in 2009, standing on some ex Chatham cast track plates

By the 1890s, the goods rolling stock on the narrow-gauge part of the RAR consisted mainly of (1) a four-wheeled wagon utilising a standard wooden underframe with a cast iron double bearing assembly attached under each side to accommodate the wheelsets; and (2) a channel framed bogie wagon with cast iron bogie frames. There were at least three designs of bogie carriage in use at this time, namely the original 'knifeboard' open pattern, a closed 1st/2nd class composite with diagonal body planking and a 'curly roofed' superintendent saloon. There were also a number of Bagnall and Fowler bogie wagons left over from the abortive Suakin-Berber campaign. By World War One, the closed seven plank bogie wagon using the type (2) chassis above was the most ubiquitous item of rolling stock and a small number of these even remained on site after the closure of the railway system. There were also seven narrow-gauge passenger coaches supplied by Bristol Wagon & Carriage Works in 1917 but these, along with all other narrow-gauge passenger stock, are thought to have been disposed of in 1923.

== The standard-gauge railway ==
This railway was initially linked into the national network via the South Eastern Railway near Plumstead railway station. According to local press reports, the link was opened in 1859 and this appears to be when the early plateways were replaced by more conventional permanent way. Horses appear to be the early internal motive power, whilst from 1871 to 1875 the 18 inch gauge locomotive Lord Raglan was likely trialled on standard-gauge stock movements using special bufferbeams (later removed) and mixed-gauge track. The first standard-gauge locomotive, Manning Wardle 0-4-0ST Driver, arrived at the Arsenal in 1875 and for the next thirteen years that type was their primary motive power (even two out of the three standard-gauge experimental compressed air locomotives tested during 1880–1 were officially Manning Wardle products) until a purchase from Hawthorn Leslie in 1888.

From this period up to 1917 the standard-gauge locomotive fleet was augmented steadily by second-hand acquisitions and new machines from various sources. Rolling stock by World War One consisted of such diverse items as standard goods wagons, rail ambulances, proof sleds and gun wagons requiring special heavy-gauge running rails. The surviving pre-1903 standard-gauge locomotives were quickly disposed of in 1919 bar one 'hulk' but overall the inter-war rationalisation was less severe than the 18 inch gauge. The latter's passenger service was transferred to the standard-gauge in 1923. Despite the large transfer of material away from the Arsenal early in World War II, it had a revival during this period with the acquisition of more steam and diesel locomotives from 1936 to 1940. During the post Suez rundown there was a rapid withdrawal of the steam fleet and even some diesel replacements were drafted in during the late 1950s from other Ordnance sites. However the standard-gauge system ultimately closed when munitions manufacture at Woolwich ceased in 1967.

== See also ==
- British industrial narrow-gauge railways
- British narrow-gauge railways
- Decauville
- Minimum-gauge railway
