= Colne Valley Water =

Water company in England

Coordinates: 51.634628°N 0.410015°W

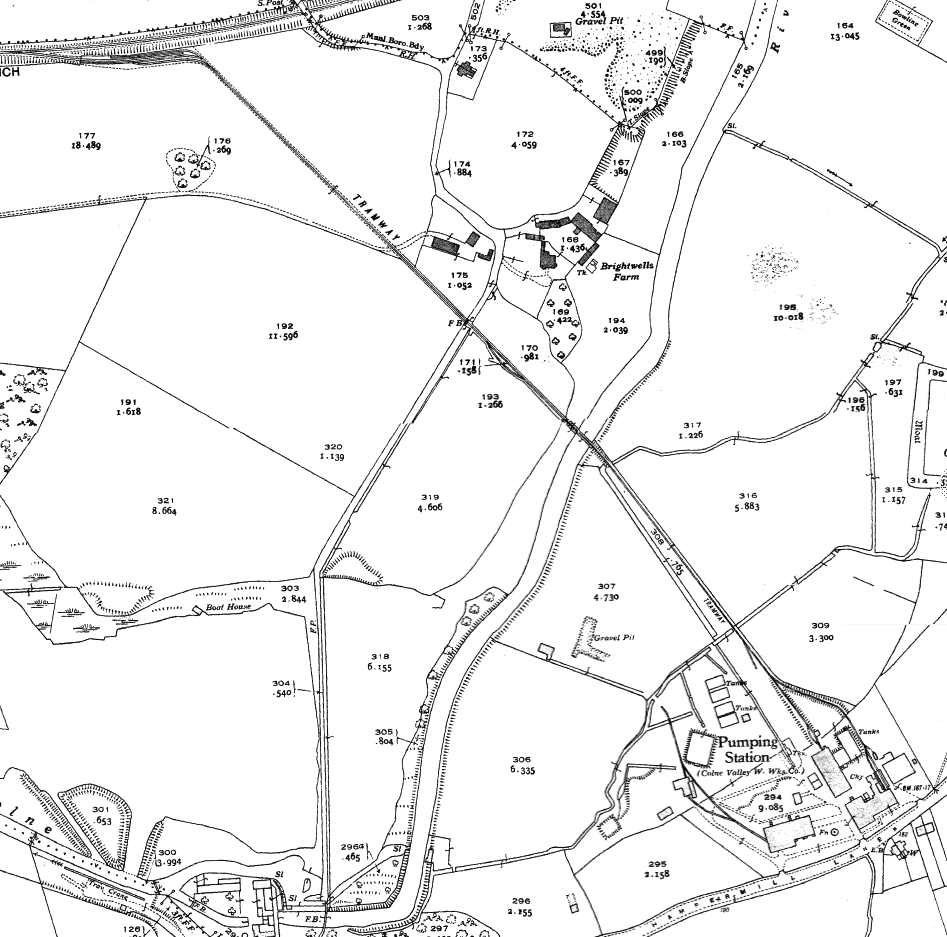
Colne Valley Waterworks Tramway on 1939 1 to 2,500 OS map

The Colne Valley Water Company was a statutory water company in the United Kingdom, formed in 1873. For a hundred years its water supply was obtained from underground sources accessed by boreholes. Pressure on these resources led to the Three Valleys Scheme and the construction of nine miles of trunk main from the River Thames was completed in 1974. In 1994, Colne Valley merged with the other two companies in the scheme, the Rickmansworth and Lee Valley Water companies, to form Three Valleys Water plc. That in turn was acquired by Veolia Water in 1987, and renamed to Veolia Water Central.

== History ==
Colne Valley Water Act 1873
- Act of Parliament
- Parliament of the United Kingdom
- Long title: An Act for better supplying with Water certain parishes and districts in the counties of Hertford and Middlesex.
- Citation: 36 & 37 Vict. c. lxxx

Dates
- Royal assent: 16 June 1873

In 1837, Robert Stephenson, while acting as the engineer on the London to Birmingham railway line, sank boreholes for water supply. In 1840, a committee of the House of Lords instructed him to carry out further investigations in the Bushey area, where there was no piped water. He established that a good supply could be provided in the Colne Valley area but it took another 30 years and a typhoid outbreak before anything was done. Eventually, an agreement was reached in December 1872 to form a water company, based on Stephenson's findings and the Colne Valley Water Act 1873 (36 & 37 Vict. c. lxxx) was passed in June 1873. The estimated population to be served was a mere 7,000.

Colne Valley Water Act 1885
- Act of Parliament
- Parliament of the United Kingdom
- Long title: An Act for transferring the Undertaking of the Harrow Waterworks Company to the Colne Valley Water Company and for other purposes.
- Citation: 48 & 49 Vict. c. cxxxiii

Dates
- Royal assent: 31 July 1885

Text of statute as originally enacted

Harrow Waterworks Act 1854
- Act of Parliament
- Parliament of the United Kingdom
- Long title: An Act for better supplying the Inhabitants of the Parish of Marrow in the County of Middlesex with Water.
- Citation: 17 & 18 Vict. c. xxx

Dates
- Royal assent: 2 June 1854

Text of statute as originally enacted

Central Middlesex Water Act 1894
- Act of Parliament
- Parliament of the United Kingdom
- Long title: An Act to authorise the Central Middlesex Water Company Limited to sell and transfer a portion of their Undertaking to the Colne Valley Water Company and for other purposes.
- Citation: 57 & 58 Vict. c. clxxxiv

Dates
- Royal assent: 17 August 1894

Text of statute as originally enacted

There was an initial reluctance by the public to subscribe due to the long-term nature of the investment but shares were eventually issued at par. Within five years of opening, Colne Valley Water was supplying 250,000 gallons a day to a population of under 9,000 although no dividends were paid until 1883. By the Colne Valley Water Act 1885 (48 & 49 Vict. c. cxxxiii), Colne Valley made its first acquisition of a neighbouring undertaking – the Harrow Waterworks Company, authorised by the Harrow Waterworks Act 1854 (17 & 18 Vict. c. xxx). The Central Middlesex Water Company, which had been authorised by the Alperton and Sudbury Water Order 1884, was bought using powers in the Central Middlesex Water Act 1894 (57 & 58 Vict. c. clxxxiv), taking the company into Wembley. By 1900, Colne Valley was supplying a population of 60,000 and the ensuing decades featured applications for new boreholes to service the steadily increasing population.

In 1927, a new bill was presented to Parliament for two additional pumping stations near St Albans. The bill was opposed by the Metropolitan Water Board and withdrawn by Colne Valley with the MWB agreeing to supply Colne with 5 million gallons a day. However, in return, Colne agreed that it would not seek approval for new wells within the watershed of the River Thames and its tributaries – in effect, forfeiting the right to develop water resources in its own area of supply. The restriction was described as "crippling" and it was 26 years before the agreement was terminated. Some incremental supply was obtained in 1935 when the Bushey Hall Gravel Company sank wells on its reserves, and in 1938 from the Grand Union Canal's Aldenham reservoir.

Colne Valley Water Act 1945
- Act of Parliament
- Parliament of the United Kingdom
- Long title: An Act to authorise the Colne Valley Water Company to construct new works and to raise additional capital and for other purposes.
- Citation: 9 & 10 Geo. 6. c. viii

Dates
- Royal assent: 10 December 1945

Text of statute as originally enacted

In 1941, Colne Valley decided that it need a reservoir for additional storage and a bill was introduced for the construction of the Hilfield Park Reservoir. As earlier, the bill was withdrawn in the face of opposition but was successfully reintroduced in 1945. Under the Colne Valley Water Act 1945 (9 & 10 Geo. 6. c. viii), the company began construction of the reservoir in 1951 and it was completed it in 1955. At the time, it was the only known reservoir to be built for storing water pumped from underground. In 1956, the government advocated the regrouping of water companies into larger units and the acquisition of two water companies followed – the St Albans Water Company in 1959 and the Harpenden Water Company in 1960. Later came the acquisition of two local authority water undertakings – St Albans RDC in 1962 and the much larger Watford Corporation in 1973.

It was recognised that the underground water resources could not be developed further and there would be a need to source water from the Thames. Colne promoted the Three Valleys Scheme in conjunction with the Rickmansworth and Uxbridge Valley Water Company and Lee Valley Water Company. Thames Conservancy issued a licence for the extraction of 18 million gallons a day in 1973, to rise to 50 million gallons a day in 1985. Work began in 1972 on the construction of nine miles of trunk main from the Thames to Harrow on the Hill, completed in 1974.

In 1994, the three companies that had worked on the scheme twenty years previous, the Colne Valley, the Rickmansworth and Lee Valley Water companies merged to form Three Valleys Water. That in turn was acquired by Veolia Water UK in 1987.

== See also ==
- Colne Valley Waterworks railway
- River Colne, Hertfordshire
