= British industrial narrow-gauge railways =

British industrial narrow-gauge railways are narrow-gauge railways in the United Kingdom and the Isle of Man that were primarily built to serve one or more industries. Some offered passenger services for employees or workmen, but they did not run public passenger trains. They are categorized by the primary industry they served.

== Heavy industry ==
=== Engineering works ===
| Name | Opened | Closed | Gauge | Location | Notes |
|---|---|---|---|---|---|
| Godwin and Sons Engineering (Manchester) Ltd. | | by 1979 | 2 ft 6 in (762 mm) | Shaw and Crompton, England | Locomotive-worked line. |
| Painter Bros. Ltd. | | after 1979 | 2 ft (610 mm) | Hereford, England | Locomotive-worked line. |
| William Ainscough and Sons Mossy Lea Road | | by 1979 | 2 ft (610 mm) | Wrightington, England | Locomotive-worked line at this crane hire and general engineering company |

=== Power generation ===
Power stations were some of the last regular users of industrial steam locomotives in the United Kingdom, although most of these were standard-gauge. However, several power generation facilities used narrow-gauge railways.

| Name | Opened | Closed | Gauge | Location | Notes |
|---|---|---|---|---|---|
| Central Electricity Generating Board Fawley Tunnel | | by 1979 | 3 ft 1 1/8 in (943 mm) | Fawley, England | Two mile long tunnel under Southampton Water worked by a single battery-electric locomotive. |
| Central Electricity Generating Board Woodhead Tunnel | 1960s | 2016 | 2 ft (610 mm) | Woodhead, England | Ex-British Railways tunnel under the Pennines used to carry high-voltage electricity supply cables. Narrow-gauge railway used for cable maintenance. Moved to the new Woodhead tunnel, completed in 2016. The narrow-gauge railway through the old tunnel is now disused |
| Stourport Power Station | ? | 1989 | 2 ft 6 in (762 mm) | Stourport, England | Internal line. |
| J.S. Fry and Sons railway | ? | after 1967 | 2 ft (610 mm) | Somerdale, England | Short railway running parallel to a standard-gauge line. The narrow-gauge locomotives hauled standard-gauge coal wagons to the power station. |

=== Refineries ===
| Name | Opened | Closed | Gauge | Location | Notes |
|---|---|---|---|---|---|
| Anglo Gulf West Indies Petroleum Corporation Fawley Refinery | 1920 | 1957 | 2 ft (610 mm) | Fawley, England | Extensive diesel locomotive worked internal line at refinery |

=== Steel works ===
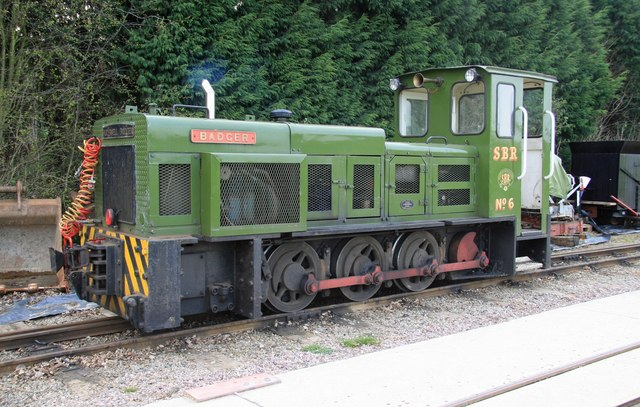
Preserved Shotton steelworks locomotive

| Name | Opened | Closed | Gauge | Location | Notes |
|---|---|---|---|---|---|
| British Steel Corporation Aldwarke Works railway | | after 1979 | 3 ft 6 in (1,067 mm) | Rotherham, England | Internal steel works railway, with an entirely new line built in 1971 |
| British Steel Corporation Micklam works | | after 1987 | 2 ft 6 in (762 mm) | Lowca, England | Underground railway serving the refractories. |
| British Steel Corporation Shotton Steel Works railway | | before 2013 | 2 ft 6 in (762 mm) | Connah's Quay, Wales | Internal steel works railway, with an entirely new line built in 1971 |
| British Steel Corporation Stanton and Staveley Works | | after 1979 | 3 ft (914 mm) | Ilkeston, England | Foundry railway worked by battery-electric locomotives |
| Clay Cross Ltd. Spun Pipe works | | after 1979 | 2 ft (610 mm) | Clay Cross, England | Internal locomotive-worked line |
| Ebbw Vale Steel Iron and Coal Company railway | | | 18 in (457 mm) | Ebbw Vale, Wales | Internal steel works railway using Ramsbottom locomotives similar to those at the Crewe Works Railway |
| Flather Bright Steels Ltd. Tinsley works | | after 1979 | 18 in (457 mm) | Sheffield, England | Internal locomotive-worked line |
| Goldendale Iron Works | | after 1957 | 18 in (457 mm) | Chatterley, England | Horse-hauled works tramway used to move pig iron. |
| Guest Keen Baldwins Iron and Steel Company Ltd. Briton Ferry Steelworks | | after 1956 | 2 ft 4 1/2 in (724 mm) | Glamorgan, Wales | Steelworks line worked by steam locomotives |
| Gurnos Tin Plate Works railway | before 1920 | | 18 in (457 mm) | Lower Cwmtwrch, Wales | Internal steel works railway |
| Sanders and Forster | | after 1979 | 2 ft (610 mm) | Stratford, London, England | Diesel locomotive worked line |

=== Zinc smelting ===
| Name | Opened | Closed | Gauge | Location | Notes |
|---|---|---|---|---|---|
| Welsh Crown Spelter Co. works | before 1904 | around 1905 | 18 in (457 mm) | Trefriw, Wales | Internal zinc works railway, supplied with one of Kerr Stuart's early locomotives |

== Construction industry ==
=== Contractor depots ===
Many construction contractors maintained depots that included narrow-gauge equipment in store and under repair. While some of these were temporary locations and often unrecorded, others were long term yards with extensive stock and facilities.

| Name | Opened | Closed | Gauge | Location | Notes |
|---|---|---|---|---|---|
| Arnold & Nathan Ltd. East Peckham depot | | after 1979 | 2 ft (610 mm) and 18 in (457 mm) | Paddock Wood, England | Battery electric locomotives for tunnelling |
| Associated Tunnelling Co. Ltd. Lowton St. Marys Depot | | after 1979 | 2 ft (610 mm) | Warrington, England | Battery electric locomotives for tunnelling |
| Baillie Contracting Co. Ltd. Coventry Depots | | after 1979 | 12 in (305 mm) | Coventry, England | |
| C. Bryant & Sons Ltd. Doris Road Depot | | after 1979 | 18 in (457 mm) | Birmingham, England | |
| Cementation Mining Ltd. Bentley Works | | after 1979 | 2 ft (610 mm) and 18 in (457 mm) | Doncaster, England | |
| Clugston Construction Scunthorpe depot | | after 1979 | 12 in (305 mm) | Scunthorpe, England | |
| Clydeside Constructional Co. Ltd. Bridge of Weir depot | | after 1979 | 2 ft (610 mm) | Strathclyde, Scotland | |
| J.F. Donelan & Co. Ltd. Manchester depot | | after 1979 | 18 in (457 mm) | Manchester, England | |
| Fairclough Civil Engineering Swynerton depot | | after 1979 | 18 in (457 mm) and 2 ft (610 mm) | Swynnerton, England | Extensive stock depot, on occasions including over 100 battery electric locomotives |
| J.J. Gallagher & Co. Ltd. Armour Close depot | | after 1979 | 18 in (457 mm) | Birmingham, England | |
| J.C. Gillespie Civil Engineering. Ltd. Green Lane depot | after 1979 | after 1987 | 18 in (457 mm) | Timperley, England | Two battery electric locomotives at depot (1987) |
| M.J Gleesons (Contractors) Ltd. Mitcham depot | | after 1979 | 2 ft (610 mm) | London, England | |
| Sam Henry & Partners | | after 1979 | 2 ft (610 mm) | unknown location | |
| J.H. Tractors Ltd. Tickhill Plant Hire | | after 1979 | 2 ft (610 mm) and 18 in (457 mm) | Doncaster, England | |
| Johnston Construction | | after 1979 | 12 in (305 mm) | Surrey, England | |
| Kier Group Setchey depot | | after 1979 | 2 ft (610 mm) | King's Lynn, England | |
| T & A.M. Kilroe Ltd. Lomax Street depot | | after 1979 | 18 in (457 mm) | Radcliffe, England | |
| Lilley/Waddington Ltd. Harvey Road depot | | after 1979 | 18 in (457 mm) and 2 ft (610 mm) | Basildon, England | |
| Lilley/Waddington Ltd. Horwich depot | | after 1979 | 18 in (457 mm) and 2 ft (610 mm) | Manchester, England | |
| Lilley/Waddington Ltd. Haunchwood Colliery depot | | after 1979 | 18 in (457 mm) and 2 ft (610 mm) | Nuneaton, England | |
| Lilley/Waddington Ltd. Charles Street depot | | after 1979 | 18 in (457 mm) and 2 ft (610 mm) | Glasgow, Scotland | |
| Macclesfield Corporation Engineers Department Store | | after 1987 | 2 ft (610 mm) | Macclesfield, England | 4wPM locomotive in store |
| Martin & Co. (Contractors) Ltd. Bristol Road South depot | | after 1979 | 18 in (457 mm) | Birmingham, England | |
| Sir Robert McAlpine & Sons Ltd. Kettering depot | | after 1979 | 2 ft (610 mm) | Kettering, England | |
| Miller Engineering & Construction Ltd. Sandiacre depot | | after 1987 | 2 ft 11 in (889 mm) and 2 ft (610 mm) | Sandiacre, England | Locomotives at construction depot |
| Raynesway Plant Ltd. | | after 1989 | 2 ft (610 mm) | Derby, England | Three out of use locomotives on site in 1989 |
| Tarmac Construction Peterborough depot | | after 1987 | 2 ft (610 mm) | Peterborough, England | Collection of 4wBE locomotives used for construction |
| M & H Tunnel & Civil Engineering Co. Ltd. Green Lane depot | | after 1979 | 18 in (457 mm) and 2 ft (610 mm) | Thurcroft, England | |
| Welham Plant Ltd. Barford Road depot | | after 1987 | 18 in (457 mm) and 2 ft (610 mm) | St. Neots, England | Battery electric locomotives at depot. |

=== Tunnelling ===
Many narrow-gauge lines were employed for short-term tunnelling contracts. Most of these are unrecorded, so this list represents only a few of the many such lines.

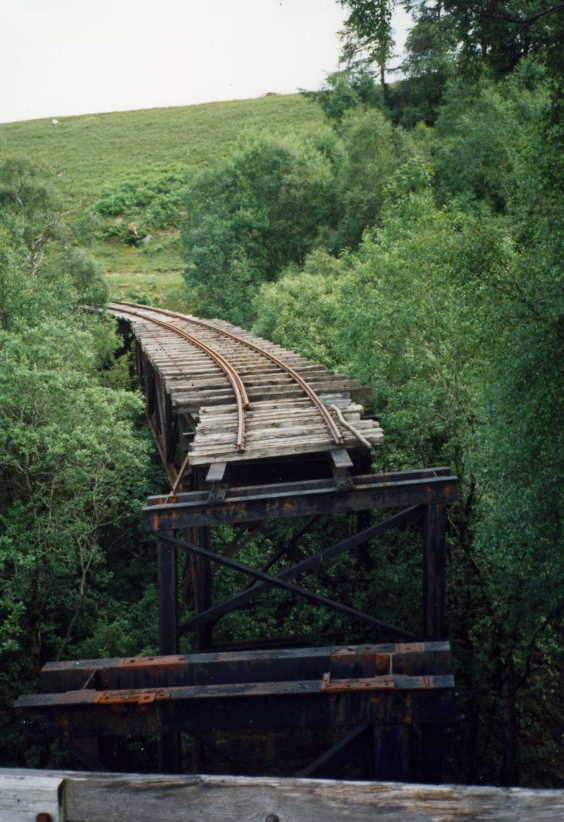
Lochaber Railway

| Name | Opened | Closed | Gauge | Location | Notes |
|---|---|---|---|---|---|
| Bedminster Water Outfall contract | 1974 | 1975 | 2 ft (610 mm) | Bedminster, England | Water tunnel construction scheme in Bristol, using eleven diesel locomotives |
| Cockermouth Sewer Contract | ? | 1988 | 2 ft (610 mm) ? | Cockermouth, England | Temporary line to serve the renewal of the main sewer tunnel. Used battery electric locomotives. |
| Eurotunnel contract | 1988 | 1992 | 3 ft (914 mm) | Dover, England | Extensive rack and adhesion railway used in the construction of the Channel Tunnel. |
| Lochaber Narrow Gauge Railway | 1925 | 1977 | 3 ft (914 mm) | Fort William, Scotland | 25 miles (40 km) long railway used in the construction of the 15 miles (24 km) long tunnel of the Lochaber hydroelectric scheme. |
| Nuttall Dover Sewer contract | 1996 | 1998 | 2 ft (610 mm) | Dover, England | Construction railway for a one-mile long interception sewer tunnel. |
| Nuttall Portsmouth Sewer contract | 1998 | 2001 | 2 ft 6 in (762 mm) | Dover, England | Construction railway for an 8 km long sewer tunnel. |
| Nuttall Southampton Rail Tunnel contract | 1985 | 1987 | 2 ft 6 in (762 mm) | Southampton, England | Diesel locomotive worked temporary railway used to reline the standard-gauge railway tunnel out of Southampton Central station |
| Selby Road sewer tunnel contract | 1971 | 1972 | 18 in (457 mm) | Leyton, England | Contractor's railway for building a new sewer tunnel in north east London. Used battery electric locomotives. |
| Weymouth and Portland Long Sea Outfall | | 1983 | 2 ft (610 mm) | Wyke Regis, England | 3 km long sewage outfall tunnel built using battery electric locomotives |

=== City construction ===
During the garden city construction boom, several new towns and cities were built using narrow-gauge railways

| Name | Opened | Closed | Gauge | Location | Notes |
|---|---|---|---|---|---|
| Ashington Village Tramway | 1880 | 1930s | 2 ft (610 mm) | Ashington, England | Tramway built to serve the mining village of Ashington. It provided coal and sewage service to houses and connected the local gas and electricity works. |
| Carr Estate | 1945? | 1947? | probably 2 ft (610 mm) | Acomb, England | Was used to construct parts of Carr Estate to the West of York. Track seen piled up at end of Woodlea Avenue 1946–7, track seen in Danebury Drive. Hand worked? |
| Port Sunlight village railway | 1905 | 1914 | 2 ft (610 mm) | Port Sunlight, England | Locomotive worked construction railway for the expansion of Port Sunlight "garden village" |
| Welwyn Garden City Light Railway | After WWI | 1936 | 2 ft (610 mm) | Welwyn Garden City, England | Locomotive worked construction railway used during the building of Welwyn Garden City. It connected the mainline with the Nabisco Shredded Wheat factory and brickworks around the site, as well as the Model Dairy. |

=== Land reclamation and river maintenance ===
Temporary and semi-permanent narrow-gauge railways were often used during land reclamation schemes

| Name | Opened | Closed | Gauge | Location | Notes |
|---|---|---|---|---|---|
| Anglian Water Authority Lincolnshire River Division | | after 1979 | 2 ft (610 mm) | Southrey, England | Locomotive depot for river bank maintenance around Lincolnshire |
| Anglian Water Authority Norfolk & Suffolk River Division | | after 1979 | 2 ft (610 mm) | Southrey, England | Locomotives used for flood protection and river bank maintenance. |
| Middle Level Commissioners Ashbeach Road Plant Depot | | after 1979 | 2 ft (610 mm) | March, England | Locomotive depot for river bank maintenance and land reclamation schemes in and around Cambridgeshire |
| North West Water Authority Mersey and Weaver River Unit | | after 1979 | 2 ft (610 mm) | Great Sankey, England | Locomotive used for river bank maintenance |
| North West Water Authority Longdendale Headworks | | after 1987 | 2 ft (610 mm) | Tintwistle, England | |
| Robert Stannard's Railway | 1816 | after 1821 | 18 in (457 mm) | Chat Moss, England | Portable hand-worked tramway used for the reclamation of Chat Moss. |
| The Embankment Tramway | 1808 | about 1830 | 3 ft (914 mm) | Porthmadog, Wales | Horse-drawn tramway used to construct the "Cob" for the Traeth Mawr land reclamation scheme. Later replaced by the Ffestiniog Railway. |
| The North Sea Camp Railway | 1935 | after 1979 | 2 ft (610 mm) | Frieston, England | Locomotive worked land reclamation scheme in the Lincolnshire Wash |
| Severn Trent Water Authority Orston Road East Depot | | after 1979 | 2 ft (610 mm) | West Bridgford, England | Locomotives used in river bank maintenance |
| Yorkshire Water Authority River Ouse scheme | | 1973 | 2 ft (610 mm) | Saltmarshe, England | Temporary riverbank line used for repairs to the River Ouse |
| Yorkshire Water Authority Ricall Plant Depot | | after 1979 | 2 ft (610 mm) | York, England | Locomotives used for river bank maintenance |

=== Reservoir construction ===
Many reservoirs constructed before the Second World War employed narrow-gauge railways to move equipment and materials.

| Name | Opened | Closed | Gauge | Location | Notes |
|---|---|---|---|---|---|
| Blake Dean Railway | 1901 | 1912 | 3 ft (914 mm) | Hardcastle Crags England | |
| Baldersdale Reservoir railway | 1889 | 1896 | 3 ft (914 mm) | Middleton in Teesdale England | |
| Bulkeley Hill Narrow Gauge Railway | 1937 | ? | 2 ft (610 mm) | Bulkeley England | 350 yards (320 m)-long cable-hauled incline used in the construction of the Bulkeley Hill reservoir. |
| Burnhope Reservoir railway | 1930 | 1937 | 2 ft (610 mm) | Wearhead England | Extensive narrow-gauge system serving the construction of the Burnhope Reservoir |
| Catcleugh Reservoir railway | 1902 | 1905 | 3 ft (914 mm) | Woodburn, England | Connection from the Woodburn station of the North British Railway to Catcleugh dam |
| Cowlyd Tramway | 1916 | 1968 | 2 ft (610 mm) | Dolgarrog Wales | Steam locomotive worked line |
| Crookfoot Reservoir railway | 1900 | 1904 | 3 ft (914 mm) | Hartlepool England | Steam locomotive worked line |
| Eigiau Tramway | 1907 | 1971 | 2 ft (610 mm) | Dolgarrog Wales | Steam locomotive worked line |
| Fontburn Reservoir railway | 1902 | 1908 | 3 ft (914 mm) | Kirkwhelpington England | Steam locomotive and horse worked line connecting to sidings on the North British Railway |
| Geltsdale Reservoir railway | 1904 | 1909 | 3 ft (914 mm) | Carlisle England | Steam locomotive worked line |
| Leighton and Roundhill Reservoir railway | 1905(?) | 1930 (?) | 2 ft (610mm) | Masham England | Railway that left the Masham Branch just north of Masham station. Construction of Roundhill and Leighton Reservoirs |
| West Baldwin Reservoir railway | 1901 | 1905 | 3 ft (914 mm) | Douglas Isle of Man | Steam locomotive worked line north of Douglas |
| Howden Reservoir construction railway | 1912 | 1915 | 3 ft (914 mm) | Derwent Valley | 8-mile long construction railways |
| Fewston Reservoir Railway | 1874 | 1879 | 3 ft (914 mm) | Washburn Valley, England | Construction of Fewston Reservoir |
| Swinsty Reservoir Railway | 1873 | 1877 | 3 ft (914 mm) | Washburn Valley, England | Construction of Swinsty Reservoir |
| Vyrnwy Waterworks Railway | 1881 | 1890 | 3 ft (914 mm) | Vyrnwy, Wales | Steam locomotive worked line used in the construction of the Llyn Vyrnwy reservoir and waterworks. |

=== Power station construction ===
| Name | Opened | Closed | Gauge | Location | Notes |
|---|---|---|---|---|---|
| Foyers Power Station construction railway | around 1970 | after 1971 | 3 ft (914 mm) and 2 ft (610 mm) | Loch Ness Scotland | Extensive network of temporary lines around Loch Ness |

=== Road construction ===
| Name | Opened | Closed | Gauge | Location | Notes |
|---|---|---|---|---|---|
| Caterham Bypass | 1939 | 1939 | 2 ft (610 mm) | Caterham, England | Diesel locomotive worked temporary lines used during the construction of the A22 bypass east of the town |
| Cranmore Depot | | after 1950 | various | Cranmore, England | Equipment depot of Roads Reconstruction (1934) Ltd. where many narrow-gauge locomotives used on road construction contracts were stored |
| Dorking Bypass | 1926 | 1926 | 2 ft (610 mm) | Dorking, England | Diesel locomotive worked line carrying chalk excavated to create new route for the A29 |
| Guildford Bypass | 1931 | 1931 | 2 ft (610 mm) | Guildford, England | Steam locomotive worked line used in the construction of the A3 |
| Kingston Bypass | 1924 | 1925 | 3 ft (914 mm) ? | London, England | Steam locomotive worked line using at least one American Davenport locomotive in the construction of the A3 bypass of Kingston upon Thames |

=== Other construction ===
| Name | Opened | Closed | Gauge | Location | Notes |
|---|---|---|---|---|---|
| Bournemouth Pier | 1980 | 1980 | 2 ft (610 mm) | Bournemouth, England | Locomotive-worked line used in reconstruction of the pier |
| Southern Railway Wimbledon-Sutton Railway | 1928 | 1930 | 3 ft 6 in (1,067 mm) | Sutton, England | Steam locomotive worked line used in the construction of the Sutton-Wimbledon line. |
| Surrey and Hants Canal Society The Deepcut Railway | 1977 | 1979 | 2 ft (610 mm) | Deepcut, Surrey, England | Diesel locomotive worked line used in the restoration of the Basingstoke Canal |

== General ==
=== Water treatment and sewage works ===
| Name | Opened | Closed | Gauge | Location | Notes |
|---|---|---|---|---|---|
| Anglian Water Authority Marsh Farm Sewage Works | | by 1979 | 2 ft (610 mm) | Tilbury, England | Locomotive worked railway |
| Anglian Water Authority Nevendon Treatment Works | | by 1979 | 2 ft (610 mm) | Basildon, England | Locomotive worked railway |
| Brede Waterworks railway | 1899 | 1935 | 18 in (457 mm) | Brede, England | Steam locomotive worked railway that hauled coal from barges unloaded from the River Brede to the Brede Valley water works. |
| Chichester Sewage Works railway | 1930s (?) | 1976 | 2 ft (610 mm) | Apuldram, England | Short line around the sewage works |
| Colne Valley Waterworks railway | 1931 | 1967 | 2 ft (610 mm) | Watford, England | Light railway connecting the LNWR Watford to Rickmansworth branch line with the Eastbury Pumping Station |
| Deephams Sewage Works railway | 1920s | 1968 | 2 ft (610 mm) | Edmonton, England | Small-scale railway at sewage treatment works |
| Dukinfield Sewage Works railway | ? | late 1980s | 2 ft (610 mm) | Manchester, England | Small-scale railway at sewage works |
| Knostrop Sewage Works railway | ? | after 1975 | 1 ft 11 1/2 in (597 mm) | Leeds, England | Experimental facility that used locomotives from the First World War into the 1970s |
| Metropolitan Water Board Railway | 1915 | 1947 | 2 ft (610 mm) | Hampton, England | Transported coal from a wharf on the River Thames to the Kempton pumping station. |
| North Bierley Sewage Works railway | | | 2 ft (610 mm) | Bradford, England | Railway serving the sewage works |
| North Surrey Joint Sewage Board railways | 1939 | after 1965 | 2 ft (610 mm) | Berrylands, England | Railways serving the Malden, Berrylands and Hogsmill sewage works (Hogsmill and Malden works railways connected c1961). |
| North Surrey Water | | present | 3 ft 6 in (1,067 mm) | Walton-on-Thames, England | Diesel locomotive worked 400 yard long line in occasional use |
| North West Water Authority Ashton works | | after 1979 | 2 ft (610 mm) | Dukinfield, England | Locomotive-hauled railway |
| North West Water Authority Llanforda Hall | ? | 1989 | 2 ft (610 mm) | Oswestry, England | Locomotive-worked railway serving the filtration beds and sand washing plant. |
| North West Water Authority Lower Rivington Reservoir | | after 1979 | 2 ft (610 mm) | Horwich, England | Locomotive-hauled railway |
| North West Water Authority Spade Mill No. 2 Reservoir | | after 1979 | 2 ft (610 mm) | Longridge, England | Locomotive-hauled railway |
| Plantation Farm Sewage Works railway | ? | after 1975 | 2 ft (610 mm) | Dukinfield, England | Railway serving the filter beds |
| Richmond Main Sewerage Board railway | 1887 | about 1950 | 2 ft 9 in (838 mm) | Mortlake, England | Short railway connecting a dock on the River Thames with the sewerage works at Mortlake. Used what was probably the first internal combustion narrow-gauge locomotive made in 1902 by engine maker Blake Motors Ltd of Kew |
| Severn Trent Water Authority Blithe Valley Works | | after 1979 | 2 ft (610 mm) | Uttoxeter, England | Locomotive-hauled railway |
| Severn Trent Water Authority Burslem Works | | after 1979 | 2 ft (610 mm) | Burslem, England | Locomotive-hauled railway |
| Severn Trent Water Authority Newstead Works | | after 1979 | 2 ft (610 mm) | Trentham, England | Locomotive-hauled railway |
| Severn Trent Water Authority Stoke Bardolph Sewage Works | | after 1989 | 2 ft (610 mm) | Nottingham, England | Locomotive-hauled railway |
| Severn Trent Water Authority Strongford Works | | after 1979 | 2 ft (610 mm) | Barlaston, England | Locomotive-hauled railway |
| Severn Trent Water Authority Tunstall Works | | after 1979 | 2 ft (610 mm) | Stoke on Trent, England | Locomotive-hauled railway |
| Wandle Valley Sewerage Board railway | ? | 1963 | 2 ft (610 mm) | Merton, England | Internal sewerage railway |
| Water Orton Sewage Plant railway | before 1968 | 1990 | 2 ft (610 mm) | Minworth, England | Internal sewerage railway of the Upper Tame Main Drainage Authority |
| Wood Lane Tip railway | before 1961 | | 2 ft (610 mm) | Kensington, England | Railway serving the refuse tips operated by Kensington Council |
| Yorkshire Water Authority Naburn Purification Works | | after 1979 | 2 ft (610 mm) | Naburn, England | Locomotive-worked works railway |
| Yorkshire Water Authority Old Whittington Sewage Works | | after 1979 | 2 ft (610 mm) | Chesterfield, England | Locomotive-worked sewage works railway |

=== Gas works ===
| Name | Opened | Closed | Gauge | Location | Notes |
|---|---|---|---|---|---|
| Berkhamsted Gasworks Railway | ? | 1955 | 16 1/2 in (419 mm) | Berkhamsted, England | Short horse-worked line connecting the gasworks with a goods yard |
| Bournemouth Gas & Water Company Railway | 1864 | 1930s | 3 ft (914 mm) and 2 ft (610 mm) | Bournemouth, England | 3 ft (914 mm) gauge elevated railway for coal transport until 1918. 2 ft (610 mm) gauge locomotive worked line for gasholder construction in the early 1930s. |
| Dundee Gasworks Railway | ? | ? | 1 ft 11 1/2 in (597 mm) | Dundee, Scotland | Internal steam-hauled gas works railway. |
| Granton Gasworks Railway | ? | 1965 | 2 ft 6 in (762 mm) | Edinburgh, Scotland | Internal steam-hauled gas works railway. |
| Hilsea Gasworks Railway | | | 2 ft 6 in (762 mm) | Portsmouth, England | Steam-locomotive hauled gasworks railway. |
| Harrogate Gasworks Railway | 1908 | 1956 | 2 ft (610 mm) | Harrogate, England | Steam-hauled railway running from the North Eastern Railway to Harrogate gasworks. |
| London Gas Light Co. Nine Elms Works | 1863 (?) | 1927 | 3 ft (914 mm) and 2 ft (610 mm) | London, England | Internal steam-hauled railway hauling coal to the gasworks, replaced by conveyor belts |
| South Metropolitan Gas Company East Greenwich Works | before 1910 | 1933 | 750 mm (2 ft 5 1/2 in) | London, England | Internal steam-hauled gas works railway. |
| South Metropolitan Gas Company Old Kent Road Works | 1892 | 1953 | 3 ft (914 mm) | London, England | Internal steam-hauled gas works railway on the Old Kent Road. |
| South Metropolitan Gas Company Vauxhall Works | 1890s | after 1951 | 3 ft (914 mm) | London, England | Internal steam-hauled gas works railway. |
| Southern Gas Board, Poole Gasworks | 1944 | 1972 | 2 ft (610 mm) | Poole, England | Internal gasworks line using Lister locomotives |
| Stroud Gas Light & Coke Co. Tramway | 1924 | 1956 | 2 ft (610 mm) | Stroud, England | Petrol-driven locomotives ran from coal chute on the Stroud branch of the Midland Railway, over two branches of the River Frome, to 1833 gasworks alongside Stroudwater Navigation |
| Winnal Gasworks Railway | | | 2 ft 8 in (813 mm) | Winchester, England | Overhead electric-locomotive hauled gasworks railway. |
| York Gasworks Company | 1915 | 1959 | 2 ft 3 in (686 mm) | York, England | Electrified railway, operated by a locomotive built by Dick, Kerr & Co. |

=== General freight ===
| Name | Opened | Closed | Gauge | Location | Notes |
|---|---|---|---|---|---|
| Belvoir Castle Tramway | 1815 | 1918 | 4 ft 4 1/2 in (1,333 mm) | Belvoir Castle, England | A short horse-drawn line used to haul coal and other goods from a Grantham Canal wharf to the castle. |
| Guilford Tramway | 1903 | 1930 | 3 ft 6 in (1,067 mm) | Sandwich, England | Steam locomotive worked, freight-only line serving the St. George's Golf Club. |
| Portreath Tramroad | 1809 | 1867 | 3 ft 6 in (1,067 mm) | Portreath, England | Early freight and mineral horse-hauled hauling plateway. One director's carriage survives in the Royal Cornwall Museum |
| Redruth and Chasewater Railway | 1826 | 1915 | 4 ft (1,219 mm) | Redruth, England | Freight and mineral hauling line; horse-drawn until 1854; later steam worked. |
| St. Michael's Mount Tramway | 1879 | present | 2 ft 5 in (737 mm) | Marazion, England | Cable-hauled railway and incline delivering supplies and guest's luggage to St Michael's Mount. |
| Swanage Pier Tramway | 1858 | 1930s | 2 ft 6 in (762 mm) | Swanage, England | Coal, stone and general freight line between Swanage town and Old Pier. Originally standard gauge but converted to narrow gauge between 1860 and 1880. Some track still exists in situ. |
| Talisker Distillery | ? | 1930s | 2 ft (610 mm) | Isle of Skye, Scotland | Hauled goods from a pier to the whisky distillery. |

=== Forestry ===
| Name | Opened | Closed | Gauge | Location | Notes |
|---|---|---|---|---|---|
| Ampthill Timber Railway | 1917 | 1918 | 3 ft (914 mm) | Ampthill, England | Controller of Timber Supply (CTS) forestry railway using one Kerr Stuart Haig class locomotive. |
| Aviemore Light Railway | 1917 | 1922 | 3 ft (914 mm) | Aviemore, Scotland | Extensive forestry railway built by the War Office Directorate of Timber Supply. |
| Cefn Vron Tramway | 1924 | 1926 | 2 ft 6 in (762 mm) | Newtown, Wales | Temporary timber hauling railway on the Welsh-English border. |
| Dornoch forestry railway | 1917 | 1922 | 3 ft (914 mm) | Dornoch, Scotland | Forestry railway built by the War Office Directorate of Timber Supply. |
| Downham Hall timber railway | 1917 | 1922 | 3 ft (914 mm) | Brandon, England | CTS timber railway using three Bagnall locomotives |
| Kerry Ridgeway Railway | 1941 | 1943 | 2 ft (610 mm) | Newtown, Wales | Temporary timber-hauling railway at Kerry, Powys. |
| Kerry Tramway | 1887 | 1923 | 2 ft (610 mm) | Newtown, Wales | Locomotive-worked line hauling timber from Kerry forest to Kerry Station on the Cambrian Railways |
| Pennal Timber Tramway | 1918 | 1920 | 2 ft (610 mm) | Pennal, Wales | Short-lived Timber Supply Department tramway carrying timber from Cwm Dwr to Pennal, reusing part of the Cwm Ebol slate tramway. Locomotive Baguley 774 worked there. |
| Wool timber railway | 1918 | 1920 | 3 ft (914 mm) | Wool, England | Forestry railway using a single Bagnall locomotive. |
| Wolsingham railway | 1917 | 1922 | 3 ft (914 mm) | Wolsingham, England | 1½ mile long timber railway using three steam locomotives. |

=== Railway works ===
| Name | Opened | Closed | Gauge | Location | Notes |
|---|---|---|---|---|---|
| Beyer Peacock Works Railway | ? | ? | 18 in (457 mm) | Manchester, England | Extensive railway serving the locomotive construction works of Beyer Peacock. |
| British Railways Beeston Sleeper Depot railway | ? | ? | 3 ft (914 mm) | Beeston, Nottinghamshire, England | Sleeper depot line |
| British Railways Chesterton Junction Central Materials Depot railway | ? | after 1979 | 2 ft (610 mm) | Cambridge, England | Materials dept internal line |
| Melton Constable Railway Works | ? | 1936 | ? | Melton Constable, Norfolk | Small narrow-gauge rail network around the M&GN works |
| Crewe Works Railway | 1863 | 1932 | 18 in (457 mm) | Crewe, England | Extensive railway serving the Crewe locomotive works of the London and North Western Railway |
| Horwich Works Railway | | 1965 | 18 in (457 mm) | Bolton, England | Railway serving the Horwich locomotive works of the Lancashire and Yorkshire Railway. |

=== Other industries ===
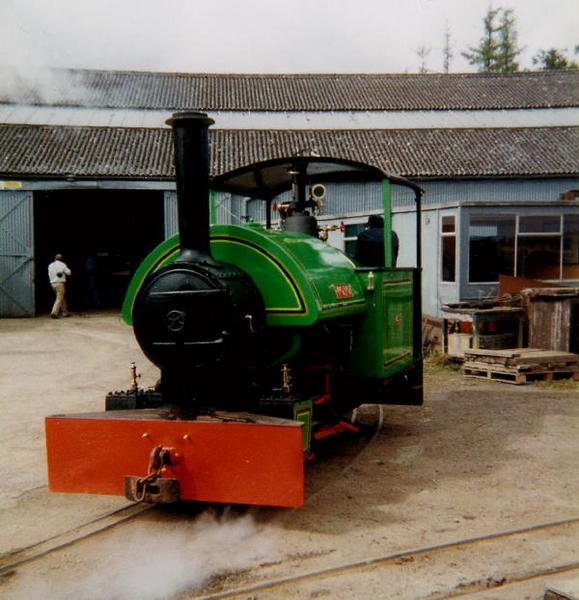
Woto, ex-BICC Belvedere, converted to 2 ft (610 mm) gauge and preserved at Alan Keef

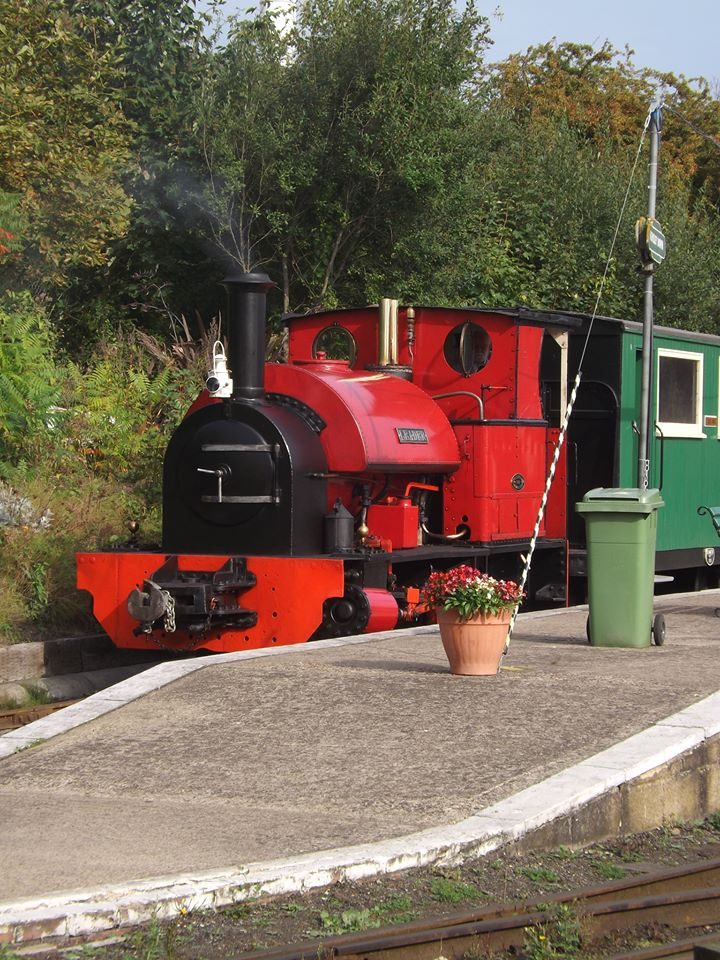
ex-Bowaters Railway locomotive Leader, preserved on the Sittingbourne and Kemsley Light Railway

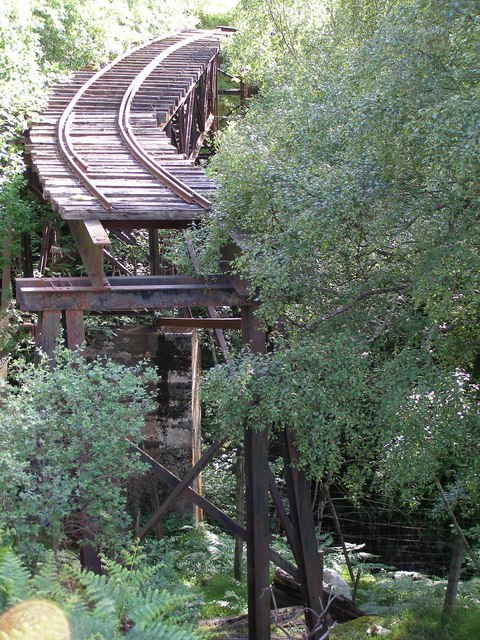
The Lochaber Railway

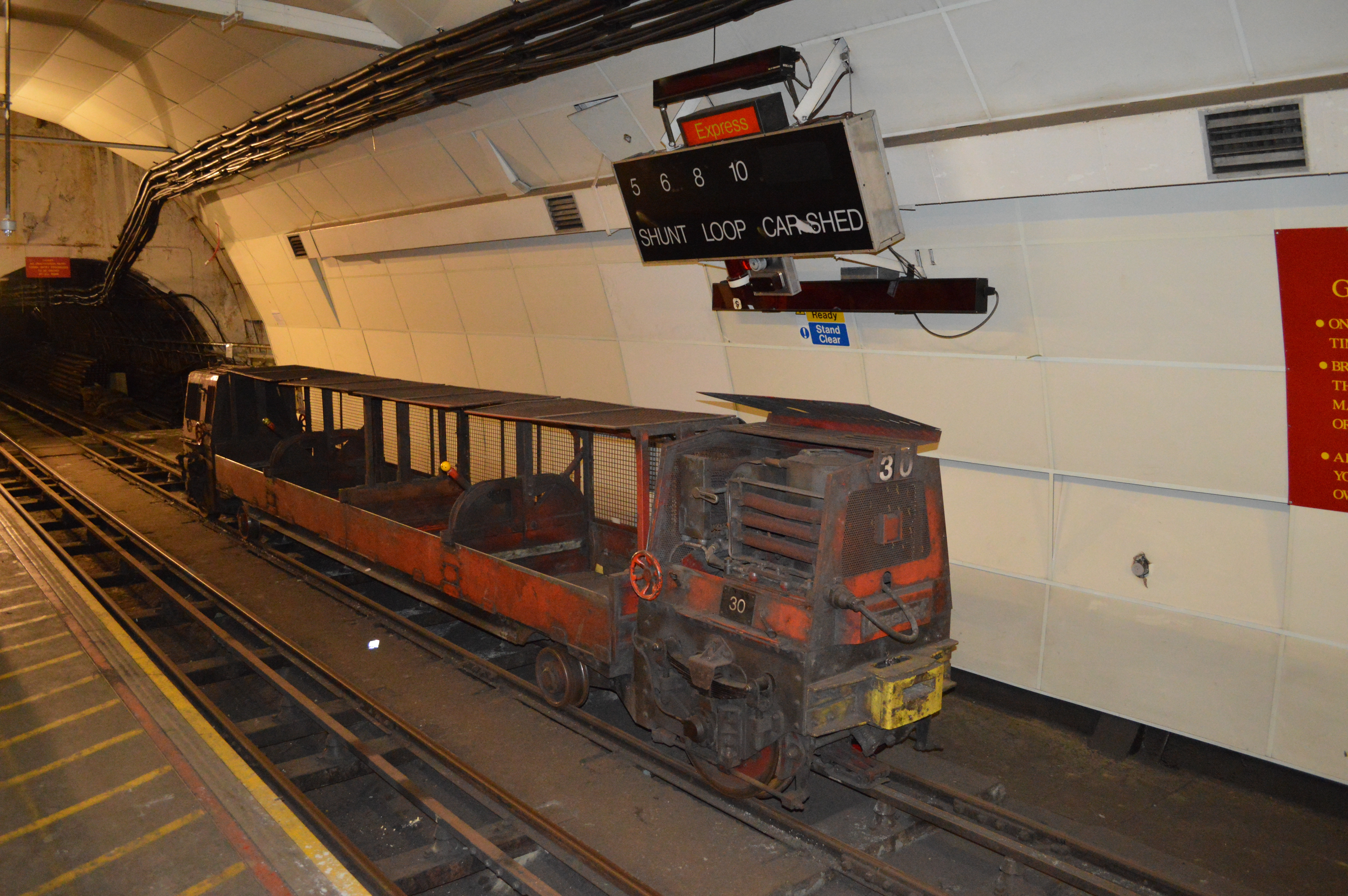
London Post Office Railway

| Name | Opened | Closed | Gauge | Location | Notes |
|---|---|---|---|---|---|
| ABCO Petroleum | before 1910 | after 1965 | 2 ft (610 mm) | Rye, England | 200-yard-long (183 m) internal railway serving the reprocessing plant. |
| Ashton Canal Carriers (Now Ashton Packet Boat Company)(incorrectly shown as Clayton Canal Carriers) | 1978 | Present | 2 ft (610 mm) | Guide Bridge, England | Short loco-worked line within a boatyard. |
| Ballard's Malt Vinegar Works | 1894 | after 1974 | 2 ft (610 mm) | Malvern, England | Hand-worked line connecting the barley malting works to the piggery. |
| Bedford and Jesty Ltd. Sylva Springs Watercress railway | before 1967 | present (but only part of the original line) | 18 in (457 mm) | Bere Regis, England | Short line serving the watercress beds powered by a home made petrol locomotive |
| Bedford and Jesty Ltd. Spetisbury Watercress railway | before 1970 | 1980 | 2 ft (610 mm) | Spetisbury, England | Short line serving the watercress beds, using motorised flatbed wagons |
| BICC Belvedere | 1930s (?) | 1968 | 3 ft 6 in (1,067 mm) | Belvedere, England | Steam-hauled railway at British Insulated Callender's Cables Ltd's cable plant. |
| BICC Prescot Refineries Unit | | after 1979 | 2 ft 6 in (762 mm) | Prescot, England | Locomotive-worked line |
| Biwater Pipes and Castings | ? | 2000 | 2 ft (610 mm), 3 ft 1/2 in (927 mm) and 2 ft 10 1/2 in (876 mm) | Clay Cross, England | Very short line for hauling pipes within the works. |
| Bowaters Paper Railway | 1906 | 1969 | 2 ft 6 in (762 mm) | Sittingbourne, England | Served Bowater's paper mills. The last steam-worked industrial narrow-gauge line in Britain. |
| British Ropes | | after 1965 | 2 ft (610 mm) | Charlton, England | Diesel locomotive worked line at rope factory |
| Bude Canal Edge Railway | 1823 | 1942 | 4 ft (1,219 mm), 2 ft (610 mm) after 1923 | Bude, England | Horse-hauled line conveying sand from Summerleaze Beach to Bude Canal. In some years storms expose the old tracks on the beach. |
| Cadbury's factory railway | 1920s | 1950s | 2 ft (610 mm) | Worcester, England | Line connecting the canal to the chocolate factory taking timber for construction of packing cases. |
| Civil Aviation Authority Laxey Airport | | after 1979 | 3 ft 6 in (1,067 mm) | Laxey, Isle of Man | Two railcars |
| Daydawn Nurseries Ltd. | 1965 (?) | 1971 | 2 ft (610 mm) | Bisley, England | Diesel locomotive worked line around garden nursery |
| Department of the Environment Harpur Hill Research Laboratory | | after 1987 | 3 ft (914 mm) | Buxton, England | |
| Droitwich Canal Trust | ? | after 1979 | 2 ft (610 mm) | Salwarpe, England | Short loco-worked line |
| Faverdale Works railway | | after 1975 | 20 in (508 mm) | Darlington, England | Railway at the Chemical and Insulating Co. Ltd, in Faverdale, Darlington |
| Gardner Machinery & Metals Dove Holes Station | | out of use by 1987 | 2 ft (610 mm) | Buxton, England | Scrap merchant yard with railway and 4wDM locomotive |
| ICI Nobels Ardeer Works | | after 1989 | 2 ft 6 in (762 mm) | Strathclyde, Scotland | At least nine locomotives on site in 1989 |
| ICI Nobels Roburite Works | | after 1979 | 2 ft (610 mm) | Shevington, England | Locomotive worked line |
| ICI Winnington Works | | after 1987 | 2 ft 6 in (762 mm) | Winnington, England | Locomotive worked line at the crystal plant at Winnington |
| Lochaber Narrow Gauge Railway | 1925 | 1977 | 3 ft (914 mm) | Fort William, Scotland | Long line built for the construction and maintenance of pipelines from Lochaber to Fort William. |
| London Pneumatic Despatch Company railway | 1863 | 1874 | 2 ft (610 mm) and 3 ft 8 1/2 in (1,130 mm) | London, England | An underground Atmospheric railway. The 2 ft (610 mm) gauge line connected Euston railway station and the North West District Post Office in Eversholt Street. The 3 ft 8 1/2 in (1,130 mm) gauge line connected Euston to Holborn |
| London Post Office Railway ('Mail Rail') | 1927 | 2003 | 2 ft (610 mm) | London, England | Driverless electric mail-delivery service, serving nine sorting offices on a 6.5 mile route between Paddington and Whitechapel. Entirely underground; double track in single 9 ft tunnel. |
| Lynlite Concrete Ltd. | ? | 1979 | 3 ft (914 mm) | Ramsey, England | Concrete suppliers. |
| Nocton Potato Estate | 1920 | 1969 | 2 ft (610 mm) | Lincoln, England | Extensive system to carry potatoes from the fields to the crisp processing plant. |
| Oakhill Brewery | 1904 | 1921 | 2 ft 6 in (762 mm) | Oakhill, England | Mile long steam operated railway connecting the brewery with the Somerset and Dorset Joint Railway at Binegar |
| Pett Level Tramway | 1934 | 1946 | 2 ft (610 mm) | Winchelsea, England | Built to aid the construction and maintenance of sea defences on the Sussex coast. |
| Port Sunlight | 1914 (?) | early 1950s | 2 ft (610 mm) | Port Sunlight, England | Locomotive-worked industrial light serving Lever Brothers soap factory. |
| Redland Pipes railway | before 1968 | 1972 | 2 ft (610 mm) | Ripley, England | Continuous circuit around the pipe works. |
| Royal Ordnance Factory | c 1938 | not known | 2 ft 6 in (762 mm) | Bishopton, Scotland | Approx 80 mile-long system serving munitions and ordnance explosives production site now owned by BAE Systems and operated by the Global Combat Systems-Munitions arm of its Land & Armaments business unit. Tracks still in situ in places |
| Royal Ordnance Factory | c 1939 | not known | 2 ft 6 in (762 mm) | Puriton, England | Extensive system serving explosives production site latterly owned by BAE Systems and operated by its Munitions & Ordnance business unit. Tracks still in situ in places when site ceased production and closed in 2007. |
| Woodhead Tunnel railway | 1960s | 2016 | 2 ft (610 mm) | Woodhead, England | Locomotive worked railway for transporting workers maintaining the high voltage electrical cables in the old Woodhead Tunnel |

== See also ==
- British military narrow-gauge railways
- British narrow-gauge railways
- British quarrying and mining narrow-gauge railways
- British narrow-gauge slate railways
- Decauville
- Industrial railway
- Minimum-gauge railway
- Tramway (industrial)

== Bibliography ==
- "Narrow Gauge Railway Museum's list of railways". Archived from the original on 14 January 2008.
- "List of British narrow-gauge steam locomotives". Archived from the original on 21 October 2008.
- Crumbleholme, Roger & Kirtland, Terry (1981). steam '81. George Allen & Unwin. ISBN 0-04-385082-0.
- Dean, Ian; Neale Andrew; Smith, David (1983). Industrial Railways of the South-East. Middleton Press. ISBN 0-906520-09-6.
- Lee, Charles E. (1945). Narrow-Gauge Railways in North Wales. The Railway Publishing Co. Ltd.
- Macmillan, Nigel S.C. (1970). The Campbeltown & Machrihanish Light Railway. David & Charles: Newton Abbot.
- Richards, Alun John (2001). The Slate Railways of Wales (1st. ed.). Llanrwst, Wales: Gwasg Carreg Gwalch. ISBN 0-86381-689-4.
- Robertson, Leslie S.; Neale, Andrew (1988). Narrow Gauge Railways - Two Feet and Under (2nd ed.). Croydon, Surrey: Plateway Press. ISBN 0-9511108-4-5.
- Stoyel, B.D. & Kidner R.W. (1973). The Cement Railways of Kent. The Oakwood Press. ISBN 0-85361-370-2.
- Talbot, Edward; Taylor, Clive (2005). The Crewe Works Narrow Gauge System (2nd ed.). Croydon, Surrey: The London & North Western Railway Society. ISBN 0954695119.
- Tonks, Eric (May 1990). The Ironstone Quarries of the Midlands Part 4: The Wellingborough Area. Cheltenham: Runpast Publishing. ISBN 1-870-754-042.
- Narrow Gauge News, the journal of the Narrow Gauge Railway Society
