= Cinque Ports Light Railway =

The Cinque Ports Light Railway was a scheme to build an electric tramway from Ramsgate to Hastings via Dover.

== History ==
In the 1880s the South Eastern Railway appointed Sir Alexander Rose Stenning, a commercial architect who later became president of the Royal Institution of Chartered Surveyors, to examine various development opportunities for the railway. These included proposals for the Cinque Ports Light Railway. It is likely that, had it been built, the gauge would have been 3 ft 6 in (1,067 mm), allowing it to run through the Isle of Thanet Electric Tramways and Dover Corporation Tramways.

In 1871, a proposal to run a tramway between Dover and Ramsgate was refused by the Board of Trade. A similar proposal in 1872, to operate between Dover and Margate, was given official go-ahead but failed to raise sufficient finance.

Subsequently, a proposed order was made by the Light Railway Commissioners under the Light Railways Act 1896 in 1899 for 67.25 miles (108.23 km) of track, marking this scheme as the most ambitious light rail proposal at the time. The scheme had developed sufficiently by 1899 that a Mr. Parker had been appointed as resident engineer and plans were presented to Hastings Borough Council in November 1899. The scheme floundered because of opposition from the people of Dover.

A. R. Stenning was also the surveyor for the Guilford Tramway, and it is possible that the intention was to incorporate that tramway into the overall route of the Cinque Ports Light Railway as the Guilford Tramway was built to this gauge.

== See also ==
- Cinque ports
