= North Surrey Joint Sewage Board railways =

Overview
- Headquarters: Surbiton
- Locale: England
- Dates of operation: 1939–after 1965
- Successor: Abandoned

Technical
- Track gauge: 2 ft (610 mm)

The North Surrey Joint Sewage Board railways were three narrow gauge industrial railways serving the sewage plants around Berrylands station in Surbiton, south London.

== Malden works ==
In 1900 the Malden & Coombe Borough Council built a sewage works at Malden, near Surbiton. This works was modernized in 1939 and a 2 ft (610 mm) narrow gauge railway was installed. A Hunslet locomotive was purchased to run on this railway.

== Berrylands works ==
In 1912 the North Surrey Joint Sewage Board built a new sewage works at Berrylands in Surbiton. In 1939 this works was also modernized. Sludge drying beds were constructed and a 2 ft (610 mm) narrow gauge railway was installed to serve them. The railway used 20 skip wagons supplied by Hudsons and a diesel locomotive built by F. C. Hibberd & Co.

== Hogsmill works ==
Between the Berrylands and Malden works lay a tract of derelict land. As early as 1931, the Hogsmill Valley Joint Sewage Board proposed construction of a third sewage works. These plans were delayed by the Second World War, but the plant was built in 1953. A third 2 ft (610 mm) narrow railway was built. This was served by a second Hunslet locomotive.

== Consolidation ==
In 1961 the three works were amalgamated as the North Surrey Joint Sewage Board. The Hogsmill and Malden railways were connected via two bridges over the River Hogsmill. Another Hunslet locomotive was supplied.

== Locomotives ==
Builder	Type	Date	Works number	Notes
F. C. Hibberd & Co.	4wDM	1939	2201	Supplied new to the Berrylands works; now preserved at the Devon Railway Centre
Hunslet	4wDM	1939	1962	Supplied new to the Malden works
Hunslet	4wDM	1957	4857	Supplied new to the Hogsmill works
Hunslet	4wDM	1961	6018	Supplied new to the amalgamated works; now preserved at the Moseley Railway Trust

== See also ==
- British industrial narrow gauge railways
