= Cliffe Hill Mineral Railway =

Industrial railway in Leicestershire, England

Coordinates: 52.683333°N 1.3°W

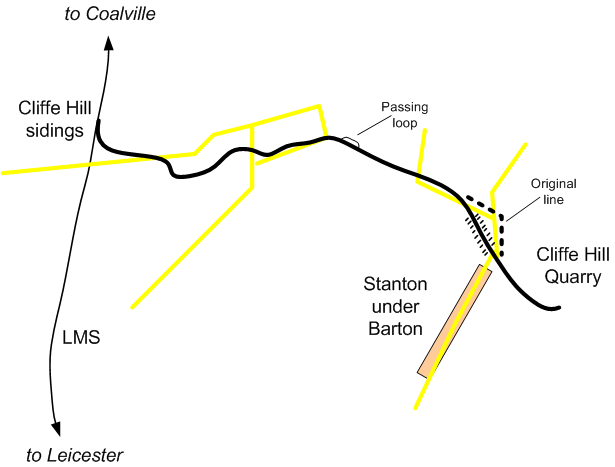
- Map of the Cliffe Hill Mineral Railway

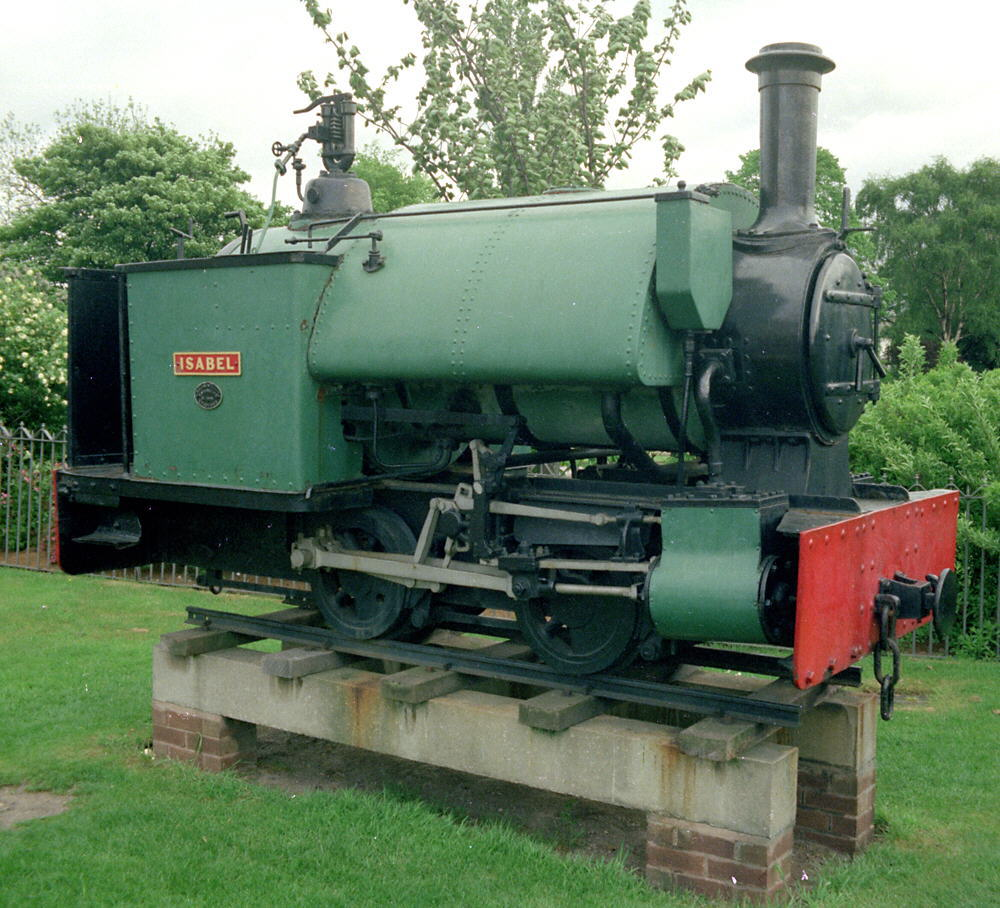
- Cliffe Hill Mineral Railway locomotive Isabel, preserved on a plinth in Stafford in 1974.

Overview
- Headquarters: Stanton under Bardon
- Locale: England
- Dates of operation: 1896–1948
- Successor: abandoned

Technical
- Track gauge: 2 ft (610 mm)

The Cliffe Hill Mineral Railway was a 2 ft (610 mm) narrow gauge industrial railway that connected the Cliffe Hill granite quarry to the nearby London Midland and Scottish Railway (LMS) between Leicester and Coalville. The line opened in 1896 and operated until 1948.

== History ==
Granite is reputed to have been quarried from the outcrop near Markfield in Leicestershire since Roman times. However, it was not until the 1860s that quarrying began on a commercial scale. In the late 1870s, two Birmingham businessmen opened a quarry at Cliffe Hill to provide street setts and kerb stones. This quarry closed in 1887 but was revived in 1889 by Mr. J. Rupert Fitzmaurice the son of one of the original owners. Fitzmaurice equipped the quarry with then modern machinery and it quickly became a commercial success.

In the first year of the new operation, 630 tons of finished kerbs and 10,200 tons of broken stone were produced. Most of this was taken by horse and cart to Bagworth station 2 1/2 miles (4.0 km) away for transit by rail. In 1892, a traction engine was purchased to help transport stone to the railway.

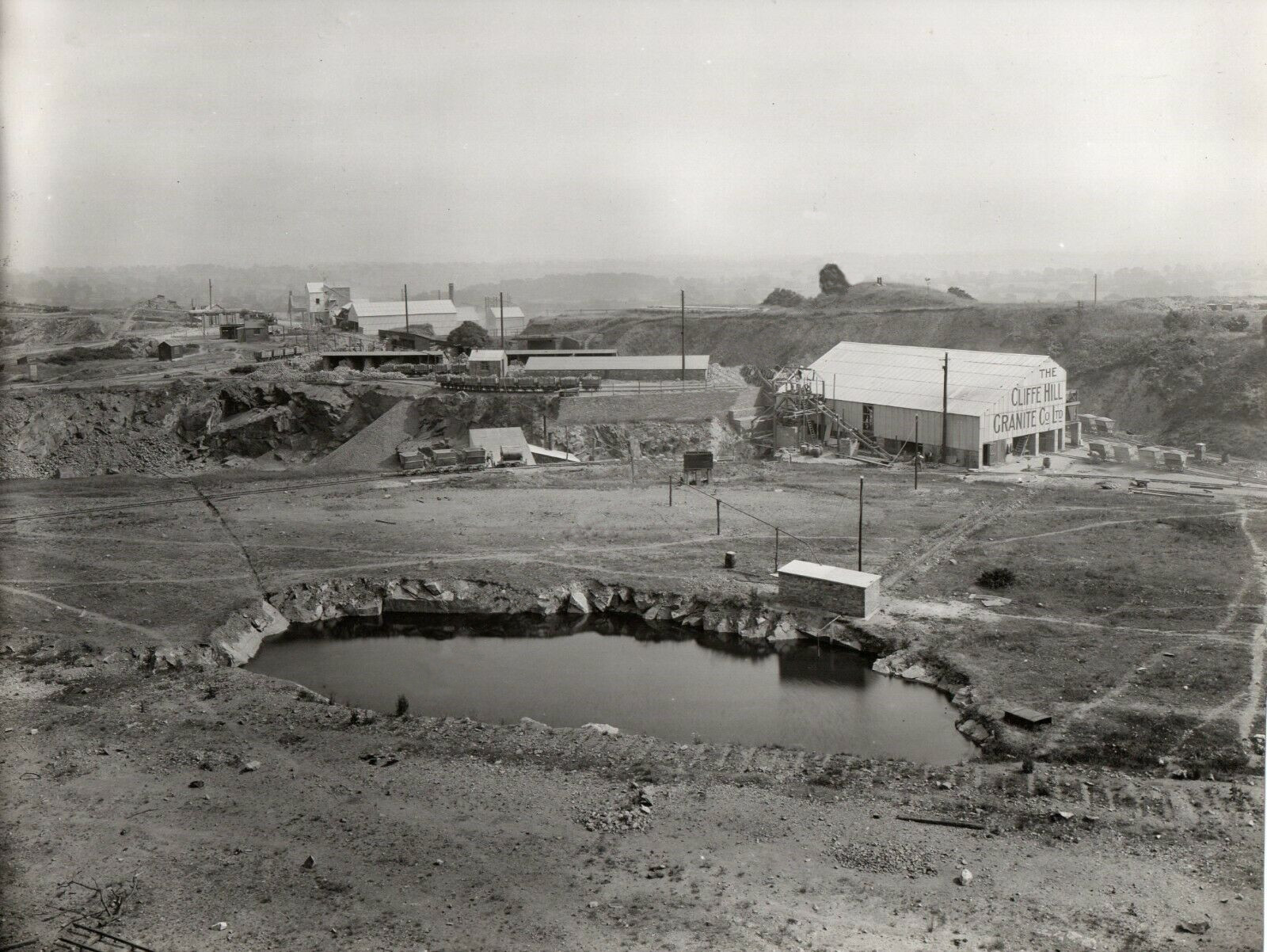
Narrow gauge railway in Cliffe Hill Granite Quarry

Over the next few years, demand for the company's products continued to increase and road transportation became a bottleneck to increasing production. The board decided to build its own railway line to move stone from the quarry to the nearest LMS line. The route to Bagworth Station would have required heavy gradients and passed over land owned by Mr. Breedon Everard, who was hostile to the notion of a railway. The decision was made to build the line south from the quarry to a transshipment point at Beveridge Lane, near Bardon Hill station.

Construction started on the line in early 1896. By the end of the year, the first steam locomotive had been delivered and was at work.

The line from the quarry to the LMS's Cliffe Hill sidings remained substantially unchanged for the life of the railway, with the exception of an embankment built in 1911 to avoid steep gradients as the line crossed a small valley near Hillcroft farm.

The railway served its purpose for more than fifty years. It employed a wide range of locomotives to move the granite trains. During the Second World War quarry production was reduced due to the lack of available workers. At the end of the war, there was a boom in the housing and roads construction industries as wartime damage was repaired. This created a strong demand for the quarry's products. At the same time, new quarrying and transportation machinery was becoming available and the company decided to reorganize production methods.

Within the quarry, lorries quickly replaced the internal railway. By 1948, road transport was replacing the need for the line between the quarry and the standard gauge railway. The decision was taken to abandon the Cliffe Hill Mineral Railway, and the last train ran in March of that year.

The track remained in situ for several years, and most of it was taken up in the mid 1950s.

As of 2020 there are still obvious traces of the railway, including a small section of track visible on the road crossing on Billa Barra Lane on the 90 degree bend, bits of track made into fence posts and the embankment between Billa Barra Lane and Stanton Lane.

== Locomotives ==
Name	Builder	Type	Works Number	Built	Disposal	Notes
Cliffe	W.G. Bagnall	0-4-0ST	1487	1896	Sold to Bardon Hill Quarry in 1946, scrapped in 1953	Cliffe, Pictured Circa 1922
Isabel	W.G. Bagnall	0-4-0ST	1491	1897	Returned to Bagnall's in 1953, now preserved at Amerton Railway	
The Rocket	W.G. Bagnall	0-4-0ST	1531	1898	Scrapped 1957	
Edith	W.G. Bagnall	0-4-0ST	1589	1900	Scrapped 1935	
Jack	W.G. Bagnall	0-4-0ST	1650	1901	Sold to Graham's Moor Quarry, Criggion, 1916	
Mary	W.G. Bagnall	0-4-2T	1943	1911	Scrapped 1957	
Gelakey No.1	Baguley	4wPM	434	1914	Scrapped 1957	Used at the quarry for a makers test in February 1914.
Jack	W.G. Bagnall	0-4-2T	2034	1915	Scrapped 1957	
Mabel	W.G. Bagnall	0-4-0ST	2077	1918	Scrapped 1948	Acquired from the Ministry of Munitions, Stamford Aerodrome, 1920
Peter	W.G. Bagnall	0-4-0ST	2067	1918	Preserved at the Brockham Railway Museum until 1982 when it moved to the Amberley Museum Railway.	Built for the Canadian Forestry Corps as 3 ft (914 mm) gauge. Acquired 1920
Samson later Tug	Sentinel	4wVBTG	6770	1926	Scrapped 1957	
	Sentinel	4wVBTG	6751	1926		
Edith	Sentinel	4wVBTG	6902	1927	Scrapped 1957	Acquired from Durham County Water Board, Burnhope Reservoir railway 1935
Kashmir	Kerr Stuart	0-6-0T	3118	1918	Scrapped 1957	Originally worked on the Kerry Tramway, later at the Stamford Aerodrome, acquired in 1941
	Orenstein & Koppel	4wDM			Presumed scrapped in 1957	From Thomas Ward, Sheffield around 1940

== See also ==
- British quarrying and mining narrow gauge railways
