= Guilford Tramway =

Coordinates: 51.275°N 1.339°E

Overview
- Headquarters: Sandwich
- Locale: England
- Dates of operation: 1903–1930
- Successor: Abandoned

Technical
- Track gauge: 3 ft 6 in (1,067 mm)

The Guilford Tramway was a narrow gauge industrial railway at Sandwich in Kent, England in the first half of the twentieth century.

== History ==
A freight-only tramway was constructed to take freight from a wharf on the River Stour via Royal St. Georges Golf Club on onward to Sandwich Bay. The line was constructed by Thomas Jones and Sons in 1903. The line was 3 ft 6 in (1,067 mm) gauge, the gauge used by the Isle of Thanet Tramways and there was some possibility that it might have been incorporated into the Cinque Ports Light Railway, an abortive Electric Tramway Scheme which planned a coastal tram route from Ramsgate to Hastings.

There was a single 250 foot riverside siding with a run round loop at Guilford Wharf on a section of the River Stour known as Bowling Green Reach. These sidings included a steam crane and a small engine shed located to the North East of the wharf.

The line then passed in front of the Golf clubhouse where the rails could be seen on a level crossing of the clubhouse access road until as late as the 1970s. The line then continued to the North of Guilford Road until splitting and being aligned with King's Avenue and Waldershare Avenue at the end of which was the Guilford Hotel. The track can be clearly seen in this photo . On Waldershare Avenue there was a small passing loop or refuge siding

The line was principally used to carry construction materials used to build the mansions that sprung up around the hotel. The line fell into disuse during the later part of First World War when some sleepers were reused to shore up defensive earthworks. It was occasionally used to serve the various army camps in the area. The line is believed to have closed in 1930.

The line may have been used during WW2 as part of the First US Army Group distraction scheme called Operation Quicksilver in the run up to the D-Day landings. However, the 1940 Luftwaffe Aerial Photo Reconnaissance set does not appear to show any track in existence but does show the alignment of the short WW1 siding built for the School of Musketry to Old Downs Farm.

A photo of the locomotive Waldershare can be found at

The Tramway including the passing loop or refuge sidings are clearly shown on the 1908 6" Ordnance Survey map see:

== Locomotives ==
Name	Builder	Type	Date	Works number	Notes
Waldershare Park	Manning Wardle	0-4-0ST	1903	1611	Survived the closure of the railway, scrapped around 1950

== See also ==
- British industrial narrow gauge railways
