= St Michael's Mount Tramway =

Light railway in Cornwall, England

Coordinates: 50.1183°N 5.4782°W

Operation
- Locale: St Michael's Mount, Cornwall, England
- Open: about 1900
- Status: Open (private)

Infrastructure
- Propulsion systems: Wire rope, powered by electric motor

Statistics
- Track length (single): 210 yards (190 m)
- Route length: 210 yards (190 m)

The St Michael's Mount Tramway runs from near the harbour up to the castle which dominates the tidal island of St Michael's Mount, in Cornwall, England. The tramway is sometimes referred to as the Dreckly Express.

== Purposes ==
The tramway was developed around 1900 by the castle's owner – Lord St Levan – to haul supplies ranging from building materials to groceries up to the castle and dustbins downhill. A notable traffic was Lord St Levan's regalia for the Coronation in 1953. It has never operated a passenger service, though one was contemplated in the late 1930s.

== Route ==
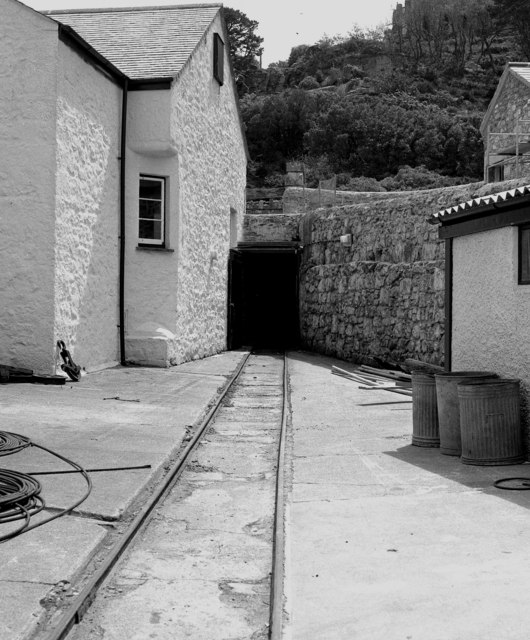
The track in the lower loading area in 1984

The single track tramway originally ran from the quayside, but some years ago it was cut back to start from a short, level, enclosed loading area. At the castle end of this loading area the line plunges into a tunnel and begins its ascent which is entirely in tunnel. Most of the tunnel was built using the cut and cover method, with just the uppermost few yards being bored through granite. The tunnel is generally about 5 feet (1.5 m) wide and 7 feet (2.1 m) high, except for the section through granite which is about 6 feet (1.8 m) high.

The line is level only at the loading areas at its ends. In between it runs on slopes ranging from 1 in 14 (7.14 %) near the foot to 1 in 1.9 (52.6%) for the last 40 yards (37 m), giving a total rise of 173 feet (53 m), emerging near the castle's kitchens.

== Haulage ==
The line's varying slopes and the curve near its foot makes the wire haulage rope more prone to thrashing than most rope-worked lines, where gravity usually holds the rope in rollers. It receives its greatest wear nearest the tram, so by buying a rope deliberately longer than necessary it is possible to cut the worn end off three times before needing to replace the whole rope. Until the mid-1920s a gas engine provided the motive power. A Ruston petrol engine was then installed to provide electricity to the castle, enabling rechargeable batteries to be installed to power the tramway. In 1951 the island was connected to the National Grid, since when the rope has been powered by a 12 horsepower (8.9 kW) AC motor. In 2018 the cable was reported to be wound by a Crompton Parkinson electric motor.

== Trams ==
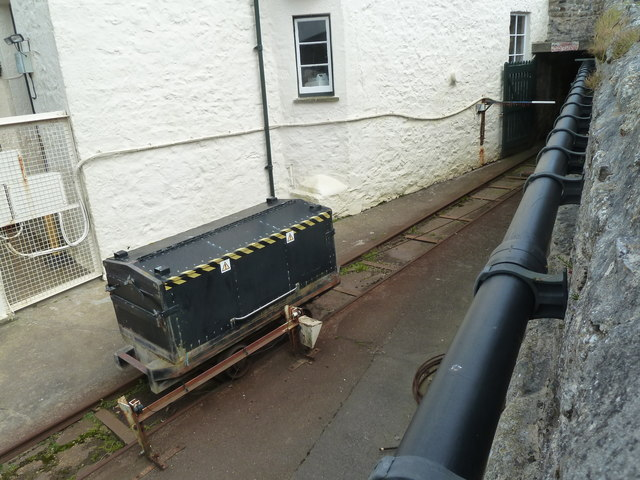
Tramway vehicle resembling a trunk, St Michael's Mount, Cornwall

Several trams have been used over the years. That used in 1964 was built locally. It had a metal frame with a wooden floor lined with galvanised sheeting and wooden side planking, some of which could be lifted out by hand to make loading and unloading easier. The wheels were loose on their axles, which themselves were able to rotate. At that time four or five runs were made in a typical day, with considerable increases if building work was taking place when, for example, granite blocks and 20-foot (6.1 m) scaffolding poles have been carried. The current tram has the general appearance of a trunk on wheels.

== Gauge ==
Most details of this short line are uncontentious, but the line's gauge, which has not changed since it was built, is variously reported on line and in the literature as:

- 2 ft 5 in (737 mm) on an information board near the line in 2018.
- 2 ft 5 1/2 in (750 mm) in The Railway Magazine
- 4 ft 6 in (1,372 mm) in St Michael's Mount

== Current usage ==
In 2018, the tramway was reported as being "still in regular use, perhaps not every day". However, the National Trust, which acts as the island's custodian, is said to "prohibit visitors from seeing it", though it is mentioned in the Trust's publicity. The only part readily accessible to the public is the disused last few feet, ending at the harbourside wall, in which a pair of wooden buffer stops is embedded.
