= Brede Waterworks =

Waterworks at Brede, East Sussex, England

Coordinates: 50.931588°N 0.579384°E

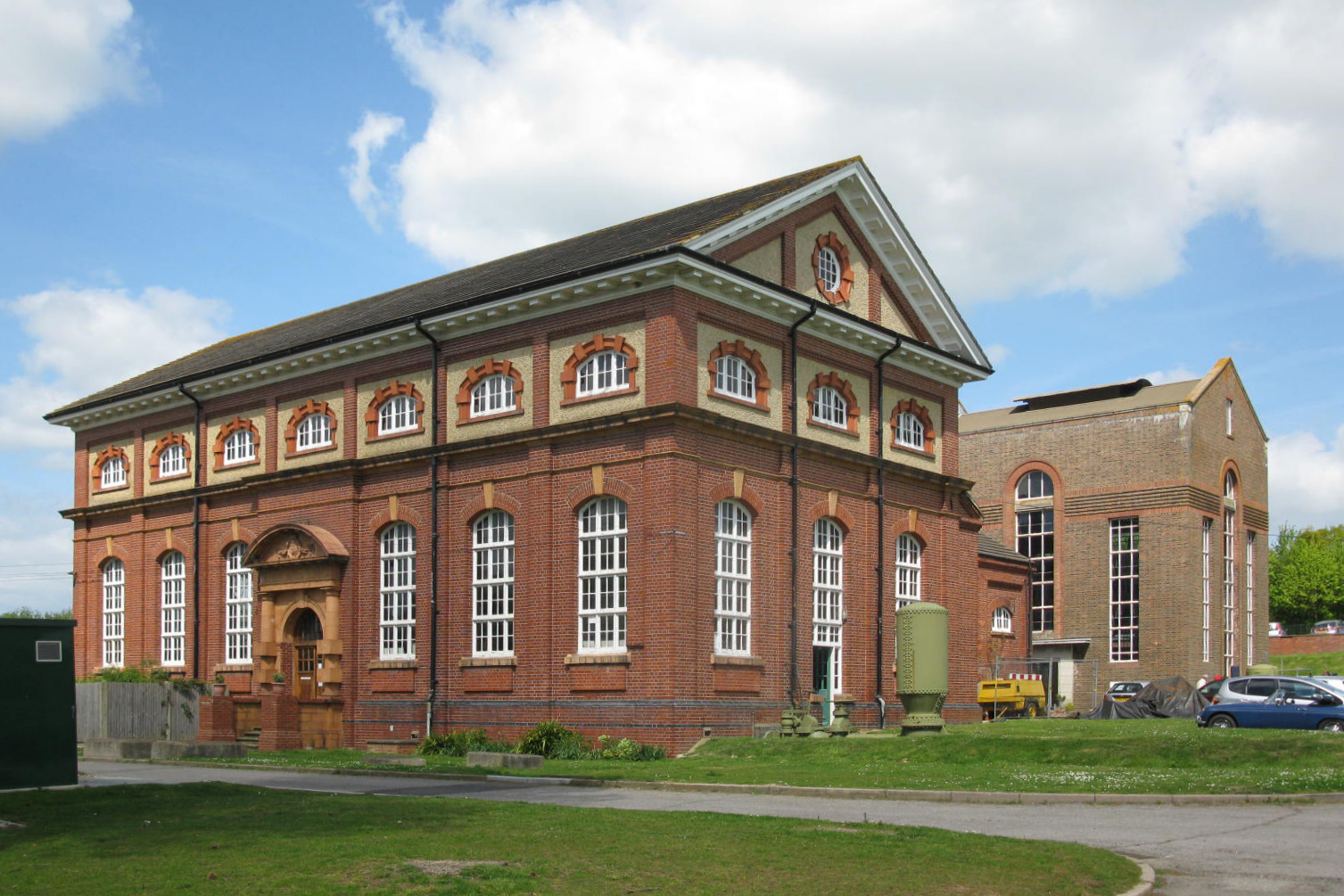
Brede Waterworks, the Worthington-Simpson building is to the right rear.

Brede Waterworks (grid reference TQ 813 178) is a waterworks at Brede, East Sussex, England. It was built to supply Hastings with drinking water. The waterworks still houses two of the three stationary steam engines that were used to pump water from Brede to reservoirs at Fairlight and Baldslow.

== Background ==
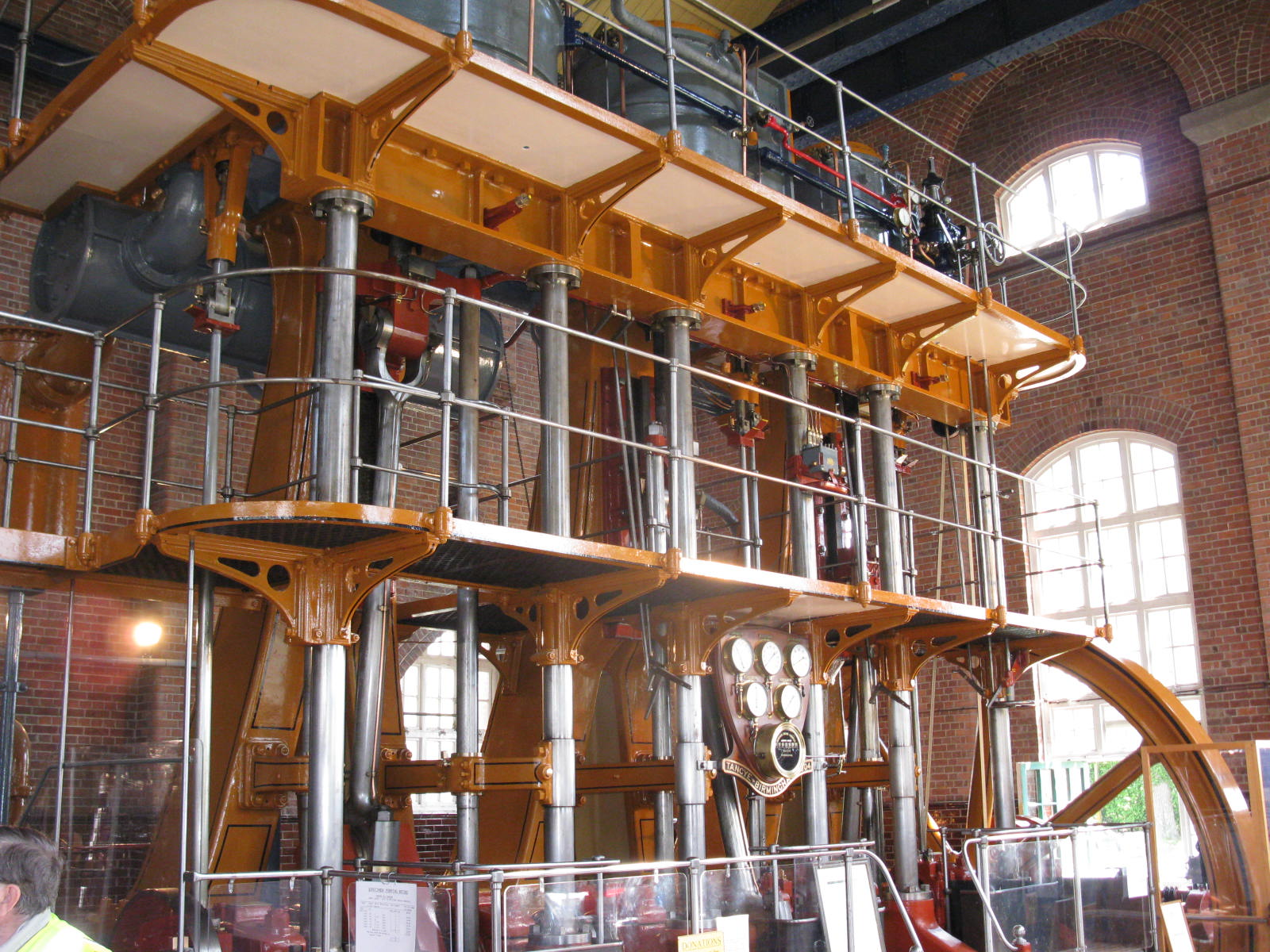
The surviving Tangye engine.

By the 1890s, Hastings Corporation was faced with increasing demand for water in the town. A recommendation was made that a site at Glynde would be suitable. This site had previously been identified in 1875. Another site identified as suitable was at West Dean, East Sussex. However, amateur geologist and councillor Thomas Elworthy recommended a site at Brede, claiming that its proximity to Hastings would make the scheme cheaper.

In 1897, Hastings Corporation purchased Church House Farm, Brede and sunk three wells to supply Hastings with water. Two of the wells are 275 feet (84 m) deep, located north of the River Brede while the third is 200 feet (61 m) deep and is located south of the river. A pumping station was built to house a steam engine which pumped the water from the wells to a storage reservoir at Fairlight. The waterworks opened in 1904.

== Tramway ==
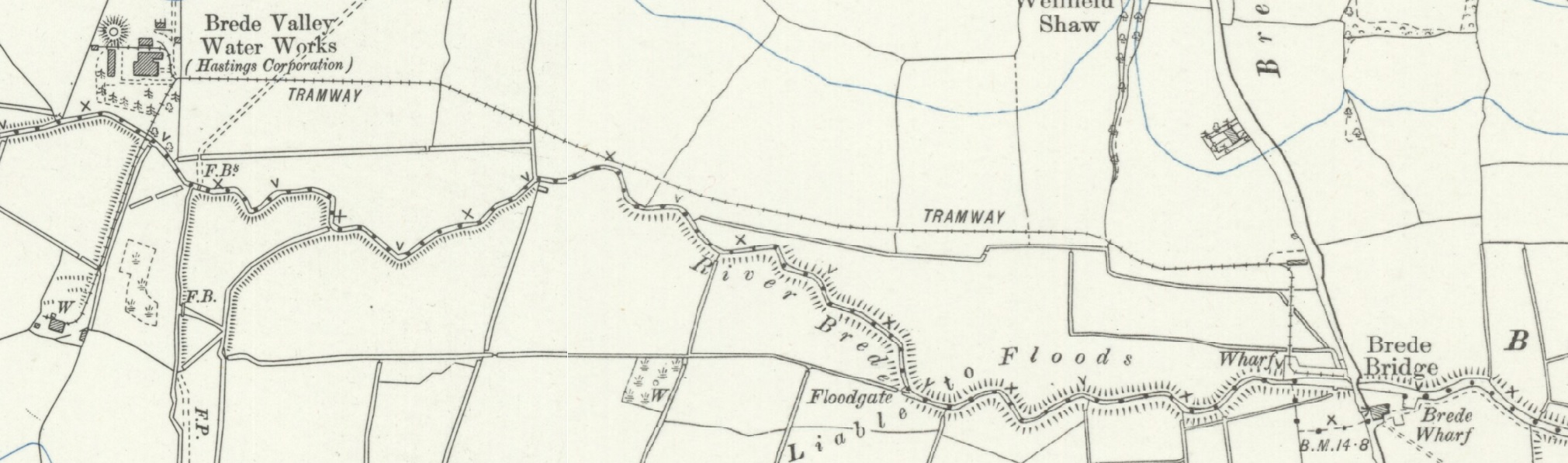
Route of the tramway, 1908

Construction of the waterworks was aided by a 18 in (457 mm) gauge tramway which ran from a wharf on the River Brede to the waterworks. Rail was 16 pounds per yard (7.9 kg/m). A steam locomotive was used to haul construction materials. Four three-ton bogie open wagons were also provided. On completion of the waterworks, the tramway and locomotive were retained to bring coal from the wharf to the waterworks to supply the boilers for the steam engines. A pony was the alternate motive power when the steam locomotive was out of service. Although no public passenger service was provided, the tramway did carry passengers on occasion when officials from Hastings Corporation visited the waterworks. Straw and hessian sacks provided makeshift seating in the open wagons.

In the 1920s, the River Brede ceased to be navigable, and that section of the tramway was abandoned. Coal was brought in from Doleham Halt on the Ashford to Hastings line to a transfer shed built some 150 yards (140 m) north of the wharf. A road was built to serve the waterworks and the tramway closed c1937. The rails were later removed. From that date, coal was delivered by lorry directly to the waterworks from Hastings station. In 1964, electric pumps replaced the steam engines and the boilers were scrapped.

=== Locomotive ===
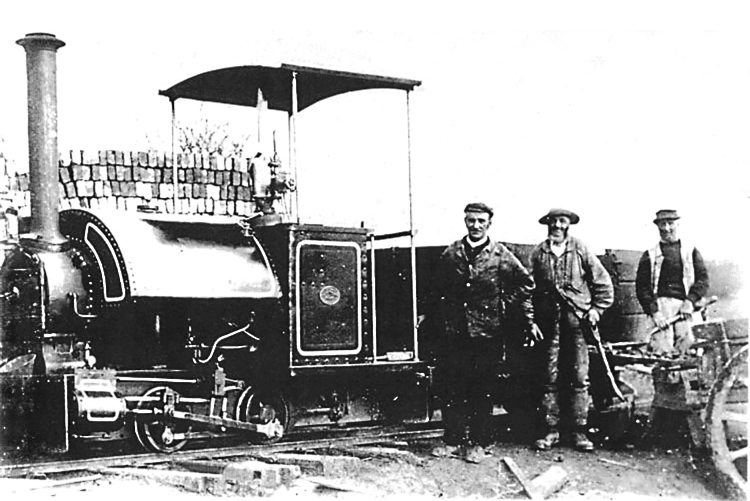
18in gauge 0-4-0ST Bagnall steam locomotive with modified Baguley valve gear built in 1899 for the Brede Waterworks Tramway

The locomotive used on the Brede Waterworks Tramway was a "Mercedes class" 0-4-0T steam locomotive, supplied by Bagnall, works number 1560/1899. It was named Brede in its early days. A new boiler was fitted in 1923 and the locomotive was rebuilt c1931 when the water tanks required replacement. The locomotive was withdrawn in 1935 as it was worn out, and subsequently scrapped.

== The original building ==
The original waterworks building was built in the Baroque style. It housed two 410 horsepower (310 kW) triple expansion steam engines by Tangye of Birmingham. The engines were powered by four boilers which were built by Babcock & Wilcox of Lynchburg, Virginia, United States. One engine was scrapped in 1969 but the second has been restored. The building is Grade II listed.

== The Worthington-Simpson building ==
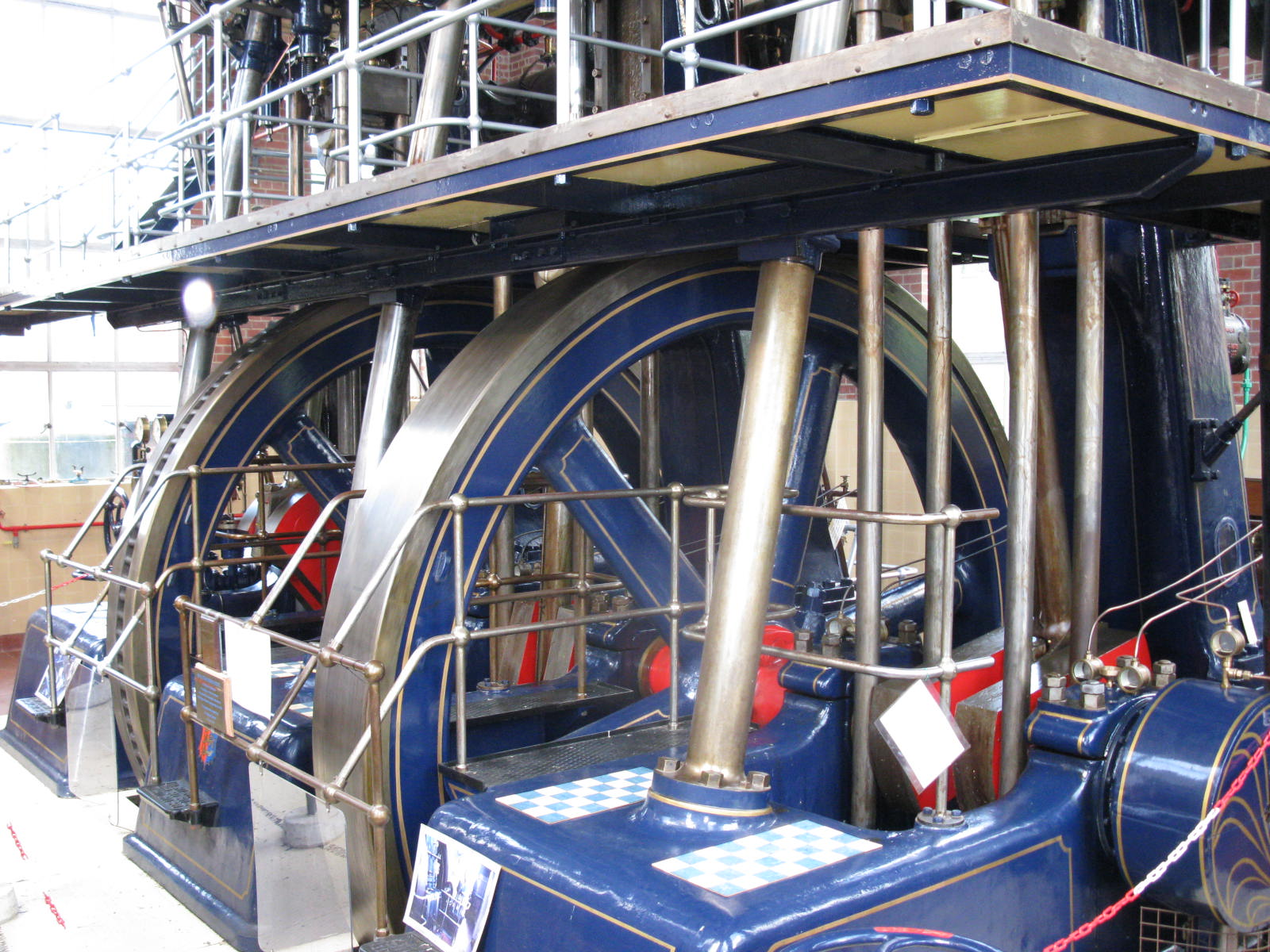
The Worthington-Simpson engine

In 1939, a new building was built in the Art Deco style. It houses a triple-expansion steam engine built in 1940 by Worthington-Simpson of Balderton, Nottinghamshire. At this date, the four Babcock & Wilcox boilers were replaced by two new ones from the same source. The new building was completed in 1942.

== The engines ==
=== No 1 engine ===
No. 1 engine was identical to No 2 engine. It was scrapped in 1969.

=== No 2 engine ===
No. 2 engine was built by Tangye of Birmingham in 1904. It is a triple expansion engine of 410 horsepower (310 kW). It can pump 3,500,000 imperial gallons (16,000,000 L) per day to a height of 515 feet (157 m). It supplied the reservoirs at Fairlight and Baldslow.

=== The Worthington-Simpson engine ===
This engine was built by Worthington-Simpson of Balderton, works number 5058/1940 and was the last of its type supplied by Worthington-Simpson.

== The boiler house ==
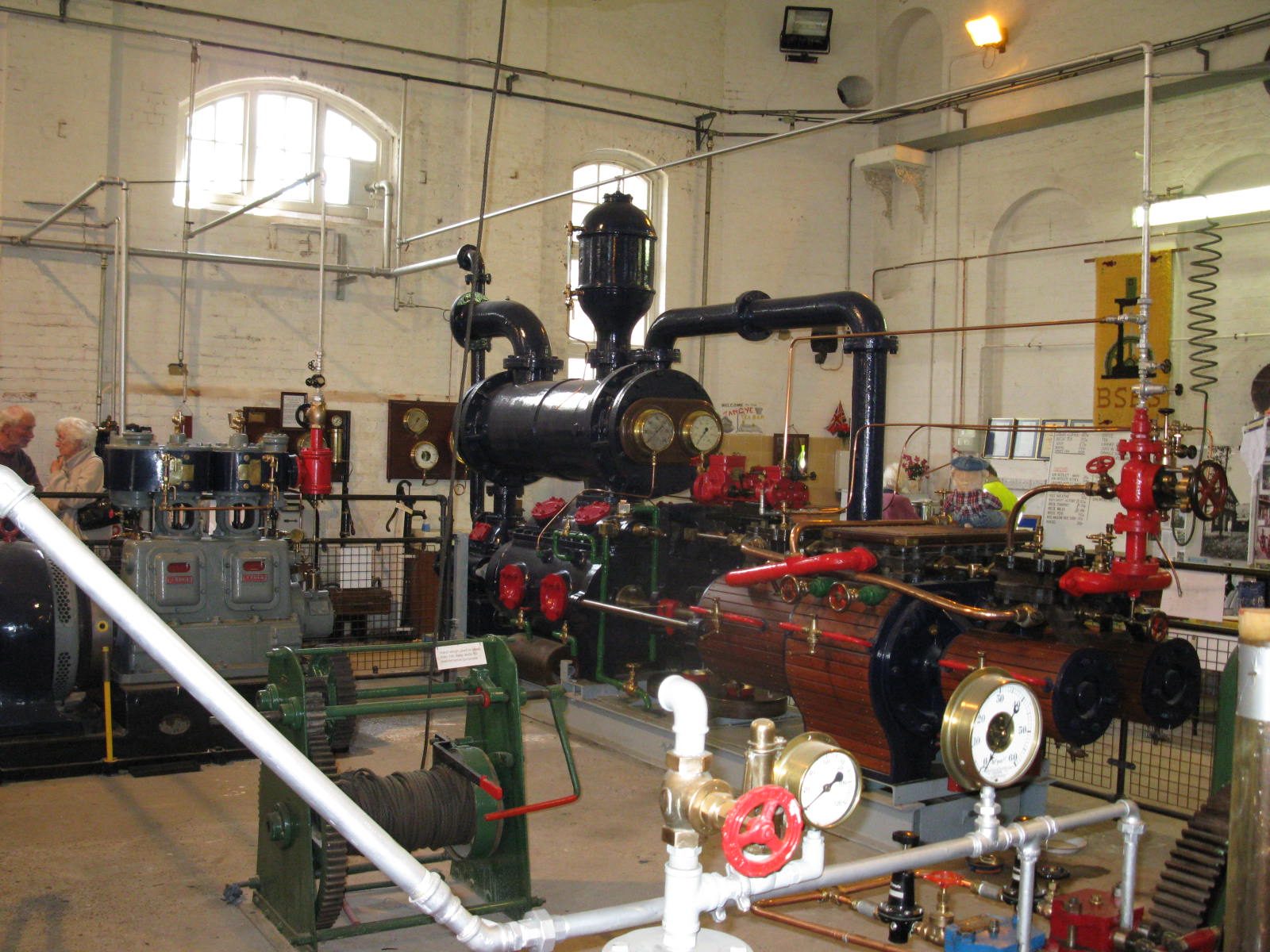
Boiler house interior

The boiler house originally housed four Babcock & Wilcox boilers. These were replaced in 1940 by two Babcock & Wilcox boilers. These were scrapped in 1964. The boiler house currently houses various steam engines and exhibits related to water supply.

== See also ==
- British Engineerium
