= Burnhope Reservoir railway =

Railway line in England

Coordinates: 54.744°N 2.241°W

Overview
- Headquarters: Weardale
- Locale: England
- Dates of operation: 1930–1937
- Successor: Abandoned

Technical
- Track gauge: 2 ft (610 mm)

The Burnhope Reservoir railway was an industrial narrow gauge railway built to serve the construction of Burnhope Reservoir near Weardale. An extensive network of 2 ft (610 mm) narrow gauge lines connected the North Eastern Railway branch terminus at Weardale with the dam construction site.

== Locomotives ==
Number	Name	Builder	Type	Date	Works number	Notes
1		Motor Rail	4wPM	1930	5067	Sold 1932
2		Motor Rail	4wPM	1930	5132	Sold 1932
3	Green	Andrew Barclay	0-4-0WT	1931	1855	Sold to the Corby District Water Company 1937; subsequently scrapped in 1959
4	Red	Andrew Barclay	0-4-0WT	1931	1991	Sold to the Penrhyn Quarry in 1936, renamed Cegin, later sold to an owner in the USA around 1965.
5	Grey	Andrew Barclay	0-4-0WT	1931	1994	Sold to the Penrhyn Quarry in 1938, renamed Glyder, later sold to an owner in the USA around 1965. Returned to Britain in 2012, now at the Beamish Museum.
6	Edith	Sentinel	4wVB	1927	6902	Purchased from J.C. Oliver of Leeds. Sold to the Cliffe Hill Mineral Railway around 1935. Scrapped 1957.
70	Black	Andrew Barclay	0-4-0WT	1931	1995	Sold to Corby District Water Company. Sold to the Dinorwic Quarry in 1948; now preserved (as No. 70) at the Hollycombe Steam Collection
72	Midge	Kerr Stuart	0-4-0ST	1923	4290	"Wren" class locomotive, ex-Coldwell Reservoir railway in 1932. Sold to South Essex Waterworks Company in 1936. Scrapped around 1940.
73	Gnat	Kerr Stuart	0-4-0ST	1923	4291	"Wren" class locomotive, ex-Coldwell Reservoir railway in 1932. Sold to South Essex Waterworks Company in 1936. Scrapped in 1950.
74	Burnhope	Kerr Stuart	0-4-2ST	1911	1144	"Tattoo" class locomotive, ex-Farlington Reservoir railway in 1932. Sold to South Essex Waterworks Company in 1936. Scrapped around 1951.
75	Wellhope	Kerr Stuart	0-4-2ST	1912	1145	"Tattoo" class locomotive, purchased in 1932. Sold to H.E. Company in 1936. Resold to East African sugar factory in 1940.
76	Ireshope	Kerr Stuart	0-4-2ST	1911	1142	"Tattoo" class locomotive, purchased in 1932. Sold to South Essex Waterworks Company in 1936. Scrapped around 1951.
77	Killhope	Kerr Stuart	0-4-2ST	1908	1047	"Tattoo" class locomotive, purchased in 1931. Sold to H.E. Coy Company in 1938.
78	Harthope	Kerr Stuart	0-4-2ST	1915	1291	"Tattoo" class locomotive, ex-Woolwich Arsenal railway around 1932. Sold to South Essex Waterworks Company in 1936. Scrapped around 1948.
79		Andrew Barclay	0-4-0WT	1918	1453	ex-RAF Calshot railway in 1931. Sold to Walston Limestone Company 1939. Scrapped by 1961.
80		Kerr Stuart	0-4-0ST	1918	4001	"Wren" class locomotive, ex-RAF Armaments School, Uxbridge in 1931. Sold to South Essex Waterworks Company in 1936. Scrapped in 1950.
81	Durham	Avonside Engine Company	0-4-0T	1933	2066	Sold to the Penrhyn Quarry in 1936; renamed Ogwen. Later sold to an owner in the USA around 1965. Returned to Britain in 2012, now at Statfold Barn near Tamworth.
82	Wear	Avonside Engine Company	0-4-0T	1933	2067	Sold to the Penrhyn Quarry in 1936; renamed Marchlyn. Later preserved in the USA. Returned to Britain as of May 2011, currently at Statfold Barn near Tamworth.
83	Lanchester	Avonside Engine Company	0-4-0T	1933	2071	Sold to the Birtley Brick Company in 1937. Eventually sold to the Dinorwic Quarry; renamed Elidir. Sold to preservation in Canada in 1966. Returned to the UK in 2006 and now at the Leighton Buzzard Light Railway.
84	Auckland	Avonside Engine Company	0-4-0T	1933	2072	Sold to the Corby Water District in 1937. Eventually sold to the Dalmia Cement Ltd., New Delhi, India.
85	Sunderland	Avonside Engine Company	0-4-0T	1933	2073	Sold to the Corby Water District in 1937. Eventually sold to the Dalmia Cement Ltd., New Delhi, India.
86	Stanhope	Kerr Stuart	0-4-2ST	1917	2395	"Tattoo" class locomotive, purchased in 1931. Sold to the Penrhyn Quarry in 1934. Derelict by 1948 and parts sold the Talyllyn Railway. Officially scrapped in 1966, with boiler to Bressingham for Hudswell Clarke 1943 "Bronllywd". "Stanhope's" restoration was completed in 1999, and it ran on the West Lancashire Light Railway until 2010 when it moved to Apedale with the Moseley Railway Trust
87	N.E.L.R.	John Fowler	0-6-0T	1926	16991	ex-Nocton Estate Light Railway (NELR) agricultural railway in Lincolnshire (see Nocton and Lincolnshire potato railways) in 1930. Scrapped 1938. This locomotive is incorrectly named as "N.E.L.P." in the book "Dam Builders' Railways from Durham's Dales to the Border".

== See also ==
- British industrial narrow gauge railways
