= Colne Valley Waterworks railway =

UK railway company

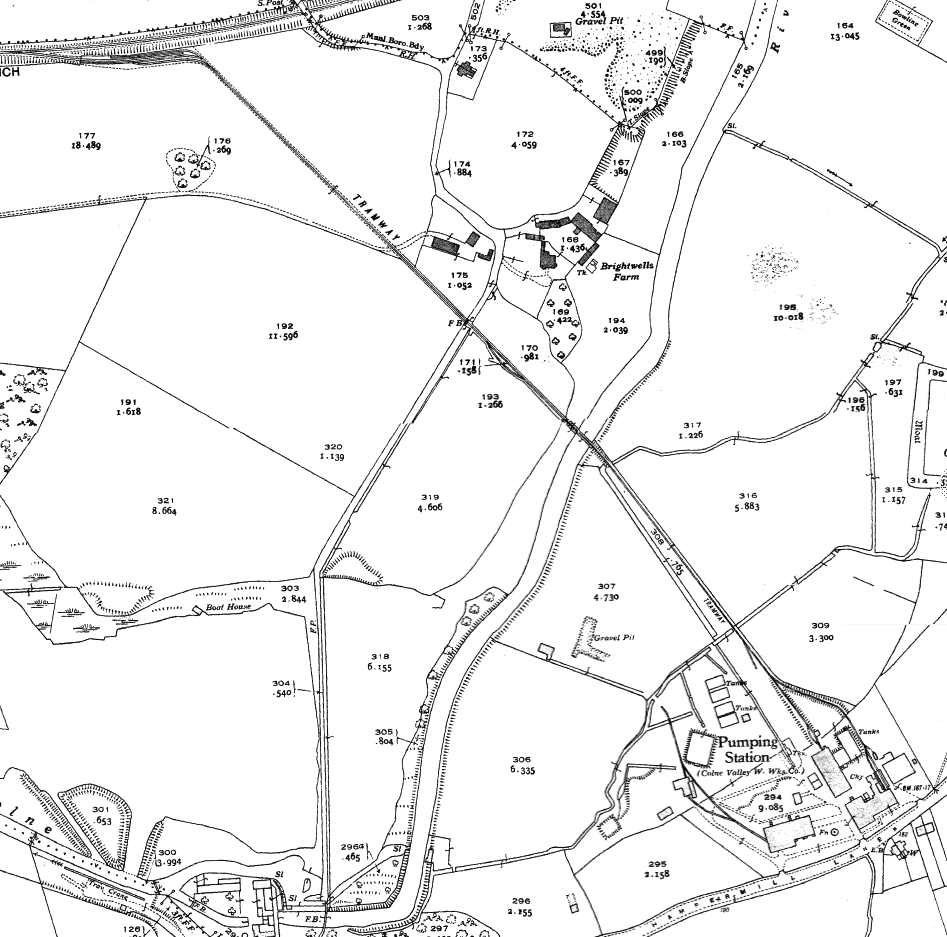
- Route in 1939

Overview
- Headquarters: Watford
- Locale: England
- Dates of operation: 1931–1967
- Successor: Abandoned

Technical
- Track gauge: 2 ft (610 mm)
- Length: 1 mile (1.6 km)

The Colne Valley Waterworks railway was a 2 ft (610 mm) narrow gauge industrial railway connecting the London, Midland and Scottish Railway (LMS) Watford to Rickmansworth branch line with the Eastbury Pumping Station to deliver coal.

== History ==
The Colne Valley Water Company opened the Eastbury Pumping Station near Watford in 1873. In 1931 the company opened a narrow gauge railway connecting the pumping station with the LMS standard gauge branch line between Watford and Rickmansworth. The line ran southeast from a private siding on the LMS line, crossed the River Colne by a relatively substantial plate girder bridge and ended in a yard at the pumping station. The railway carried coal to power the pumping station and chlorine and salt for the water softening plant.

== Decline and closure ==
The pumping station switched from coal to diesel power in 1956; after this use of the railway declined significantly. Chlorine and salt were still carried by rail. The line closed in 1967. The two locomotives were purchased for preservation.

== Locomotives ==
Number	Builder	Type	Date	Works number	Notes
1	Ruston & Hornsby	4wDM	1932	166015	Believed scrapped approx 1970
2	Ruston & Hornsby	4wDM	1933	166024	Preserved at the Amberley Chalk Pits Museum in 1968

== See also ==
- List of narrow gauge railways at water treatment and sewage works in Great Britain
