= Baldslow =

Suburb of Hastings, East Sussex, England

Coordinates: 50.892°N 0.558°E

- Location within East Sussex
- OS grid reference: TQ800131
- District: Hastings
- Shire county: East Sussex
- Region: South East
- Country: England
- Sovereign state: United Kingdom
- Postcode district: Tonbridge
- Police: Sussex
- Fire: East Sussex
- Ambulance: South East Coast

Baldslow is a suburb in the north of St Leonards-on-Sea, East Sussex, England. It is sometimes considered part of Conquest as Bohemia and Silverhill.

The area lies on the A21 and the Hastings ring road, and the A28 road junction with the A21. Ore and Central Conquest is to the East, and Ashdown and Hollington are to the West.

== History ==
The name Baldslow means "Beald’s Hill".
