= Chatterley =

Chatterley is a surname. Notable people with the surname include:

- Andy Chatterley (born 1973), music producer
- Catherine Chatterley, Canadian historian
- Lew Chatterley (born 1945), English football player and coach
- William Simmonds Chatterley (1787–1822), English actor
- Julia Chatterley, British journalist

== See also ==
- Lady Chatterley
- Chatterley railway station, Staffordshire, England
- "Far, Far, Away on Judea's Plains" (melody name, "Chatterley"), see John Menzies Macfarlane
