= Crewe Works Railway =

Narrow gauge railway in Crewe, Cheshire, England

Coordinates: 53.094°N 2.435°W

Overview
- Headquarters: Crewe
- Locale: England
- Dates of operation: 1862–1932
- Successor: Abandoned

Technical
- Track gauge: 18 in (457 mm)
- Length: 830 yards (760 m)

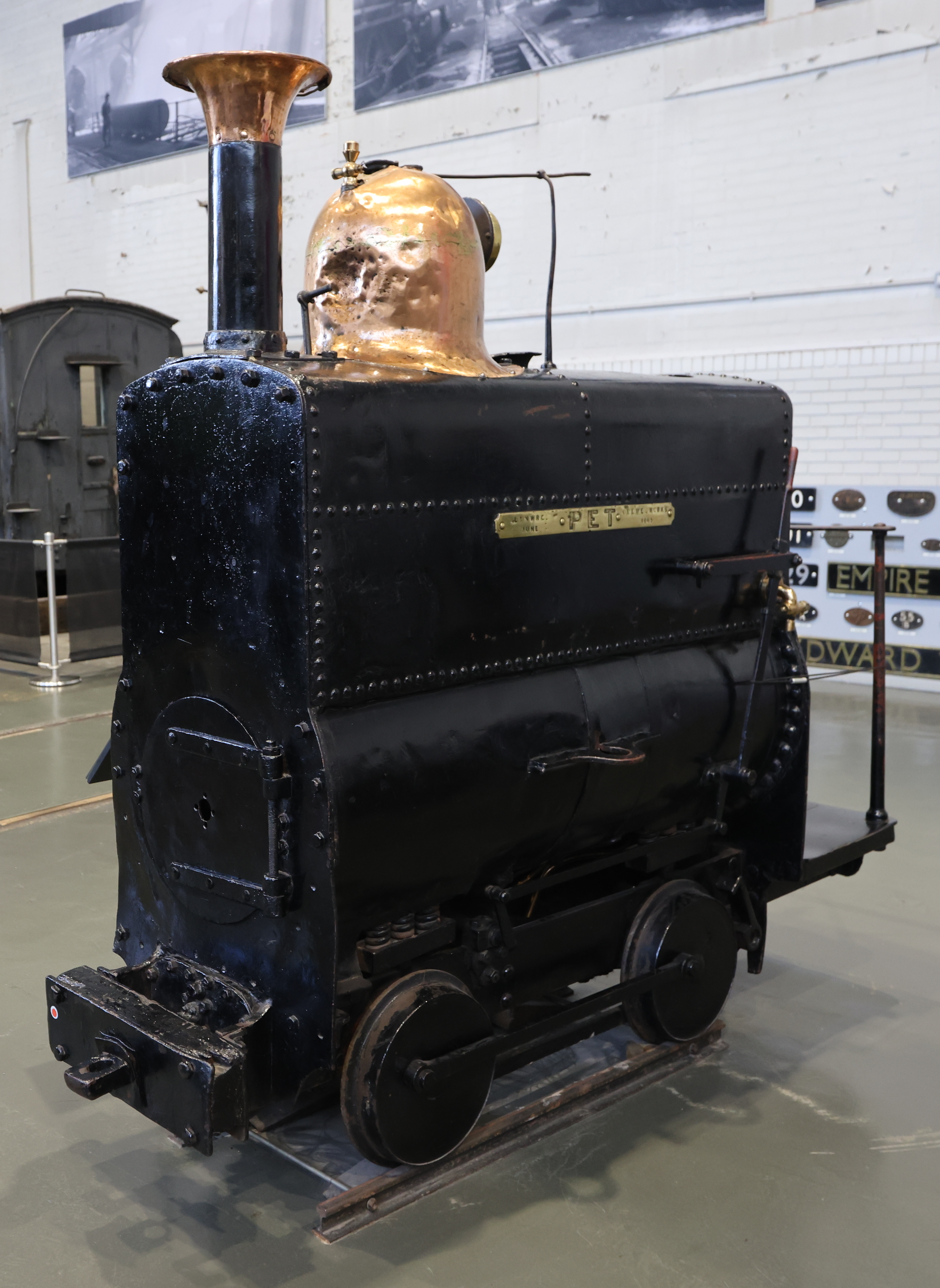
Pet, now at the NRM York

The Crewe Works Railway was a minimum-gauge internal tramway system serving Crewe Works, the main locomotive construction works of the London and North Western Railway (LNWR) and later the London, Midland and Scottish Railway (LMS). The system was first introduced by John Ramsbottom the LNWR Locomotive Superintendent from 1857 and it was a pioneering use of locomotive propelled vehicles within a manufacturing plant. The Crewe system was soon adopted elsewhere. There were four sections to this system built at different times and each in turn significantly altered several times before final abandonment. The four sections were:

- The Original LNWR (Old) Works (authorised 17 October 1861)
- The LNWR Steel Works (authorised 20 October 1864)
- The LNWR Deviation Works (built in the late 1860s)
- The Spider Bridge extension to Crewe railway station (built in 1878).

Of the above, the first section dating from 1862 was within the original locomotive works first built in 1843 and expanded many times as the railway system grew. Prior to the introduction of the tramway, most internal transport was by hand-cart and barrow. The original lines totalled 550 yards (500 m) and a further 300 yards (270 m) were added later. The "Old Works" section ceased operation around 1929.

The second, the steel works section, and largest of all, was always self-contained. From its authorisation on 20 October 1864, it lasted under locomotive haulage until the closure of steel production in 1932, but also in one short (and occasionally used hand-propelled) section in the iron foundry until about 1960.

The third, the deviation works section (latterly devoted entirely to the joinery department), was an extensive system built on at least three levels and was an entirely separate, hand-propelled tramway, which survived in spasmodic use until about 1980. Several relics, including examples of trackwork and three wagons, survive from this installation.

The fourth and final extension of the works tramway was of the "Old Works" system through to Crewe station, built in 1878 with the construction of the famous "Spider Bridge". This was essentially a typical railway footbridge providing pedestrian access from the works to the station and built on stilts and suspension cables for several hundred yards across the entire Crewe North junction. The bridge carried the 18-inch, single-line tramway down its centre. The spider bridge terminated at the station in a "T" junction with a footbridge spanning all passenger platforms at the north end of the station. The bridge from the works survived as a footbridge until 1939, but was apparently little used by locomotives after 1920. Goods for transfer between the works and the station had to be transferred between the tramway and the station platform via the footbridge steps. This was an unusual and serious limitation of its usefulness.

Following the abandonment of the locomotive-hauled tramway, most internal works transport at Crewe has been provided by rubber-tyred, diesel/petrol-powered tractors and trailers.

== Locomotives ==
Name	Builder	Wheel arrangement	Date	Works number	Notes
Tiny	LNWR	0-4-0ST	1862		The first of a class of five very similar engines designed by John Ramsbottom. Withdrawn and scrapped in 1928
Pet	LNWR	0-4-0ST	1865		Withdrawn 1929; preserved at the National Railway Museum, York
Nipper	LNWR	0-4-0ST	1867		Withdrawn 1929; scrapped 1931. The cutting up of "Nipper", "Topsy", "Midge", and "Dicky" (sic) was authorised by Captain H. P. M. Beames on 21 September 1929.
Topsy	LNWR	0-4-0ST	1867		Withdrawn 1929; scrapped 1931
Midge	LNWR	0-4-0ST	1872		Withdrawn 1929; scrapped 1931
Billy	LNWR	0-4-0T	1875		The first of a pair of radically different engines to the design of Frank Webb. Withdrawn 1931; sold to Cashmore's of Great Bridge, West Midlands
Dickie	LNWR	0-4-0T	1876		Withdrawn 1929; scrapped 1931
Crewe	Hudswell Clarke	4wDM	1930	D563	The first diesel locomotive built for the LMS. Transferred to the Horwich Works when the Crewe railway closed in 1932, it is now preserved at the Steeple Grange Light Railway

== See also ==
- British industrial narrow-gauge railways
- Horwich Works, home to a far more extensive 18-inch rail network
