= British quarrying and mining narrow-gauge railways =

List of quarrying and mining narrow gauge railways in the United Kingdom

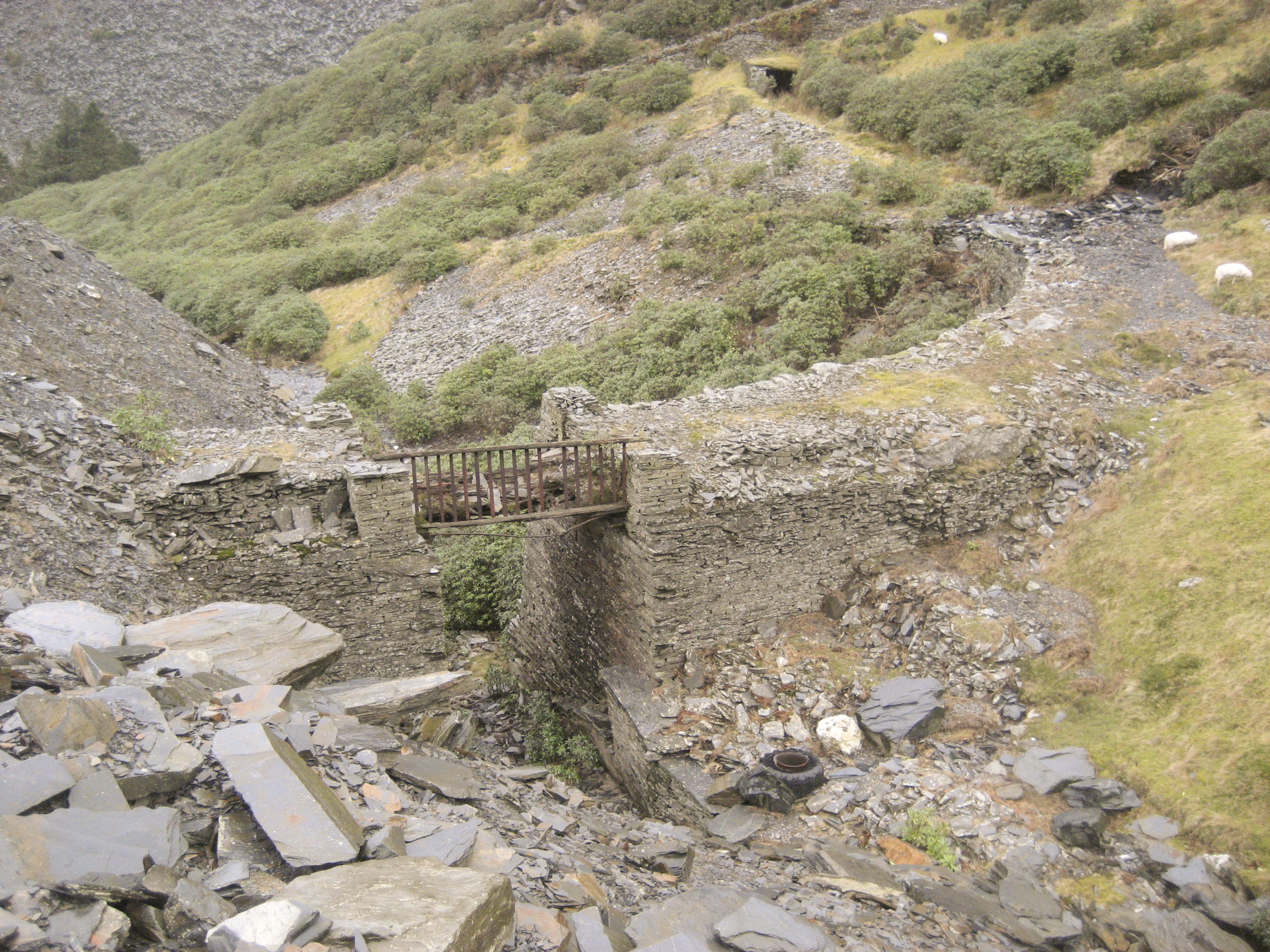
Maenofferen quarry tramways

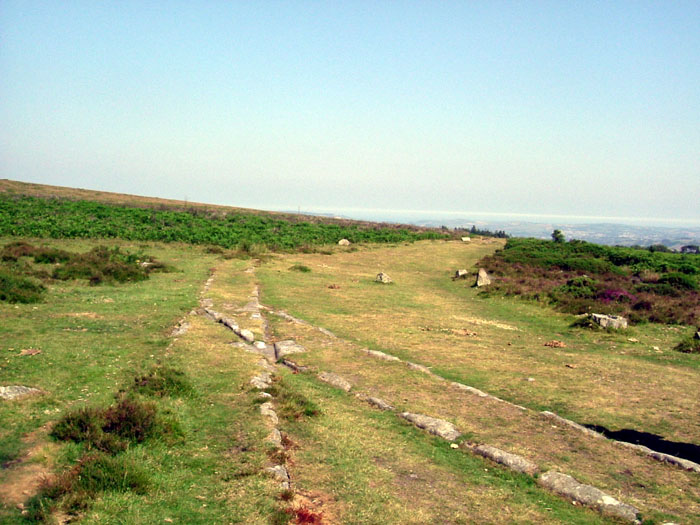
Trackwork including a point on the Haytor Granite Tramway

Some industrial narrow-gauge railways in the United Kingdom and the Isle of Man were primarily built to serve quarrying, mining, and similar industries. Some of these narrow-gauge railways offered passenger services for employees or workmen, but they did not run public passenger trains. They are listed by the primary industry they served.

== Cement works ==
Many of the cement works and their associated chalk pits had narrow gauge railways, particularly those in the South East of England. The Associated Portland Cement Manufacturers Ltd. (APCM, later Blue Circle Industries, and Lafarge) was the major producer of cement in the United Kingdom in the second half of the twentieth century and many of their plants used railways.

Name	Opened	Closed	Gauge	Location	Notes
APCM Cliffe Works	1934 ?	1959	2 ft (610 mm)	Cliffe-at-Hoo, England	Extensive diesel-hauled chalk pit railway.
APCM Bevans Works	?	after 1962	2 ft (610 mm)	Northfleet, England	Short line operating on a riverside wharf
APCM Harbury Works	?	after 1961	3 ft (914 mm)	Harbury, England	Quarry line worked with a rare Fowler 2-4-0 diesel locomotive
APCM Holborough Works	1923	1969	3 ft (914 mm)	Snodland, England	Steam- and diesel- hauled railway at the Associated Portland Cement Manufacturers Ltd's cement plant at Holborough.
APCM Sittingbourne Brickworks	before 1898	after 1963	2 ft (610 mm)	Sittingbourne, England	Internal brickworks railway
APCM Rodmell Works	before 1910	1975	2 ft (610 mm)	Beddingham, England	Short line serving a cement works
APCM Sittingbourne Works	?	1971	4 ft 3 in (1,295 mm)	Sittingbourne, England	Cement works line with the last narrow gauge steam locomotive in that industry.
APCM Kent Works	1877	1927	3 ft 9 1/2 in (1,156 mm)	Greenhithe, England	Steam-hauled railway at the Associated Portland Cement Manufacturers Ltd's cement plant at Greenhithe.
APCM Sundon Works	?	1974	3 ft (914 mm)	Luton, England	Cement works line.
British Standard Cement Works	1912	1932	2 ft (610 mm)	Rainham, England	Notable as the only industrial line in Britain to use an ex-WDLR Baldwin locomotive.
Broom Bank	1933	1962	4 ft 3 in (1,295 mm)	Murston, England	Steam hauled cement works and clay pit line
Chinnor Cement & Lime		1962	2 ft (610 mm)	Chinnor, England	Locomotive and cable worked lines serving the chalk quarry and washmills.
Smeed Dean & Co.	1900	1949	3 ft 7 1/2 in (1,106 mm)	Murston, England	Chalk pit line
Francis & Co.	1871	1920	3 ft 8 1/2 in (1,130 mm)	Cliffe, England	Steam-worked chalk quarry railway
Gillingham Portland Cement Co.	1870s?	1910	3 ft 6 in (1,067 mm)	Gillingham, England	Early cement works line
I. C. Johnson & Co.	before 1872	1928	3 ft 9 1/2 in (1,156 mm)	Greenhithe, England	Internal steam hauled railway, replaced by a standard gauge line.
J. B. White & Bros - Swanscombe Works	1825	1929	3 ft 5 1/2 in (1,055 mm)	Swanscombe, England	Steam locomotive worked from 1875 onwards. Internal works line with rare outside flanged rolling stock
Knight, Bevan & Sturge	1873 ?	1928	2 ft 8 1/2 in (825 mm)	Northfleet, England	Extensive chalk quarry system, eventually superseded by a standard gauge line
Queenborough Cement Works	1896	1930?	unknown	Queenborough, England	Line worked by two Aveling and Porter steam locomotives
RPCM Barrington Cement Works		by 1979	2 ft (610 mm)	Barrington, England	Short locomotive-worked line
RPCM Rochester Works	?	1952	2 ft (610 mm)	Halling, England	Extensive cement works railway
RPCM Southam Works	?	1956	2 ft (610 mm)	Southam, England	Steam locomotive worked railway
Tolhurst & Sons	1860s	before 1948	3 ft 6 in (1,067 mm)	Gravesend, England	Large internal chalk quarry system

== Lime works ==
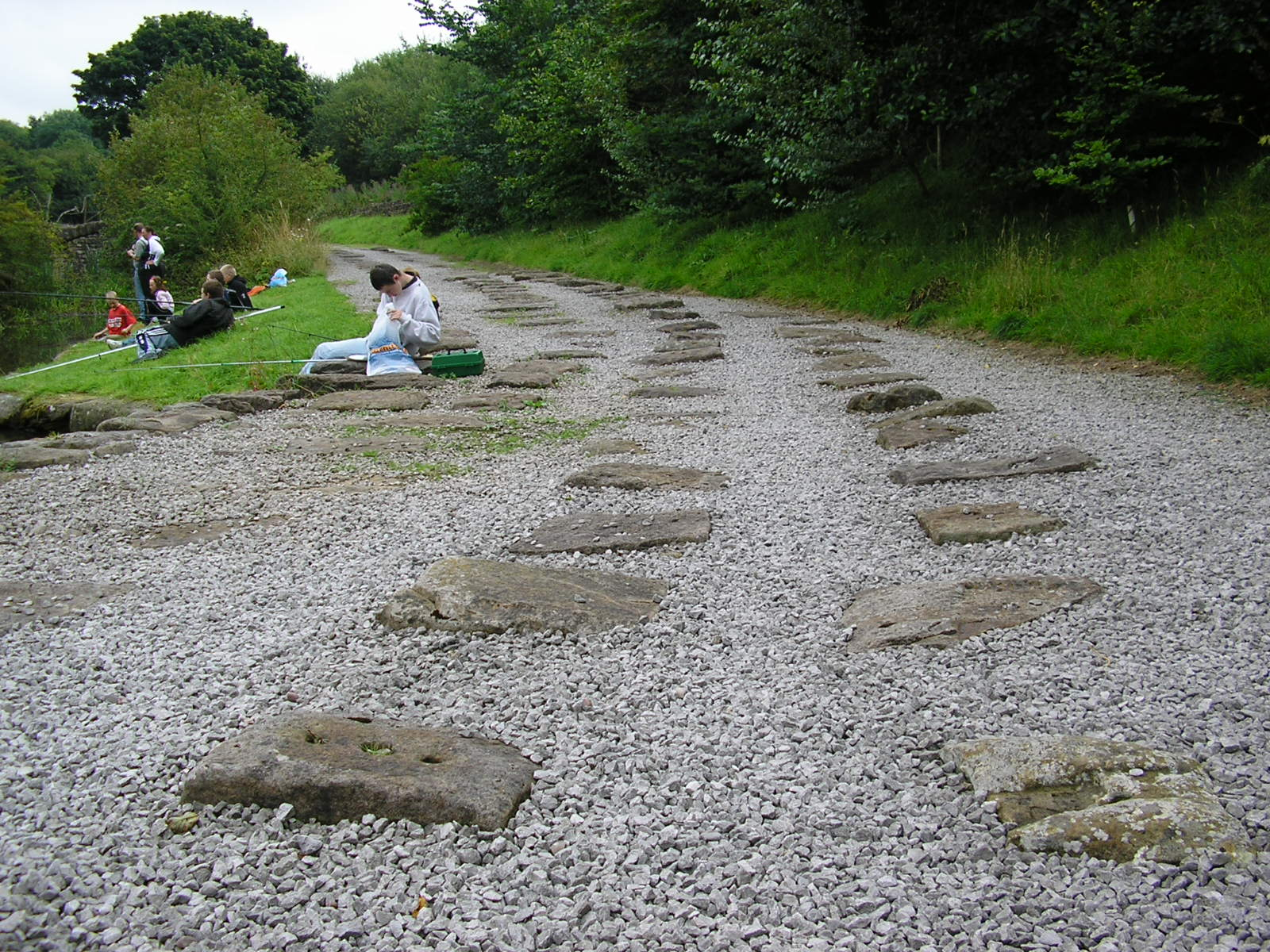
Peak Forest Tramway

Name	Opened	Closed	Gauge	Location	Notes
Barn Hill Quarry railway	1928	1938	20 in (508 mm)	Chipping Sodbury, England	800-yard (732 m) long locomotive worked line; locomotive transferred to Penlee Quarry railway in 1947
Beswick's Limeworks railway	Before 1925	?	2 ft (610 mm)	Hindlow, England	Internal tramways that used two unusual Crossley Brothers 25 hp locomotives supplied in 1925
Black Rock Quarry	before 1919	1949	2 ft (610 mm)	Portishead, England	Tramway connecting the Black Rock and Nightingale quarries with the Weston, Clevedon and Portishead Railway. Used two Hudswell Clarke 0-6-0 steam locomotives, later replaced with Motor Rail Simplex internal combustion locomotives.
British Quarrying Co Ltd Allington Quarry railway	1928	1956	2 ft (610 mm)?	Maidstone, England	Locomotive worked internal quarry system
British Quarrying Co Ltd Borough Green Quarry railway	before 1921	1956	20 in (508 mm)	Borough Green, England	Internal quarry system for "Kentish Ragstone". Originally horse worked, Simplex locomotive introduced in 1921
Brockham Limeworks	1870s (?)	1936	2 ft (610 mm)	Dorking, England	Lime pits and works railway, later home of the Brockham Railway Museum
Buriton Lime Works	before 1897	after 1936	3 ft (914 mm) and 2 ft (610 mm)	Buriton, England	Diesel locomotive worked railway
Butserhill Lime Works	before 1932	by 1945		Butser Hill, England	
Conygar Quarry	?	?	2 ft (610 mm)	Clevedon, England	Short tramway running along an embankment from the quarry to a siding on the Weston, Clevedon and Portishead Railway.
Cauldon Low Quarry	before 1906	1933	3 ft 6 in (1,067 mm)	Waterhouses, England	Limestone quarry with an internal steam-worked railway system
Dorking Greystone Lime Co.	1880	1954	3 ft 2 1/4 in (972 mm) and 2 ft (610 mm)	Betchworth, England	Well-known steam hauled internal limeworks line.
Darnley Lime Works Tramway and Mineral Railway	before 1864	early 1960s	2 ft (610 mm)	Darnley, East Renfrewshire	Tramway serving limestone and fire clay quarries
Dunball Quarry	before 1930	1954	2 ft (610 mm)	Dunball, England	Steam locomotive worked tramway connecting the Dunball quarry with the lime works
Flagstaff Quarry		1941	3 ft (914 mm)	Anglesey, Wales	Internal incline-worked quarry line
Little Ormes Head Quarry tramway	1889	1931	3 ft (914 mm)	Porth Dyniewyd, Wales	Internal limestone quarry railway.
Milton Quarry	early 1900s	1966	1 ft 11 1/2 in (597 mm)	Weston-super-Mare, England	Small limestone quarry with cable-hauled railway
Minera Limeworks	<1880s	1957	2 ft (610 mm)	Minera, Wales	Huge limestone quarry with extensive railway with inclines serving the various quarried faces.
Oxstead Greystone Lime Co.	before 1912	1971	2 ft (610 mm)	Oxstead, England	Internal railway of lime quarry and works.
Parc-y-Meirch quarry railway	1923	1958	2 ft (610 mm)	St. Asaph, Wales	Locomotive-worked line connecting the limestone quarry with the standard gauge Kinmel Camp Railway
Peak Forest Tramway	1794	1923	4 ft 2 in (1,270 mm)	Chapel en le Frith, England	Early tramway that was horse and chain hauled throughout its life.
Whitehaven Quarry	1932	1953	4 ft (1,219 mm)	Oswestry, Wales	A series of rope-hauled inclines and steam locomotive worked tramways.

== Brickworks ==
Name	Opened	Closed	Gauge	Location	Notes
A. Hone & Sons Ltd. Ewhurst Brickworks		after 1971	2 ft (610 mm)	Cranleigh, England	Diesel and battery-electric locomotive worked line
Albrook Brickworks	before 1939	after 1968	2 ft (610 mm)	Eastleigh, England	Diesel locomotive worked line
Alne Brick Co. Ltd. Alne Brickworks		1986	2 ft (610 mm)	Easingwold, England	Locomotive-worked brickworks railway. Site still producing bricks as York Handmade Brick Company.
Alne Brick Co. Ltd. Hemingbrough Brickworks		after 1979	2 ft (610 mm)	Selby, England	Locomotive-worked brickworks railway.
Baxters Brickworks railway	1888	1969	2 ft (610 mm)	Bexhill, England	Short line serving the clay pit and brickworks.
Bilsthorpe Brick Co. Bilsthorpe Brickworks		after 1979	3 ft (914 mm) and 2 ft 8 1/2 in (825 mm)	Bilsthorpe, England	Two lines serving the brickworks
Buckley Tramroad	1780s	1862	2 ft 6 in (762 mm)	Connah's Quay, Wales	Early horse-worked plateway carrying coal and bricks from a canal wharf.
Butterley Brick Ltd. Cherry Orchard Lane Works	?	1993	2 ft (610 mm)	Rochford, England	Short line serving the clay pit and brickworks.
Butterley Brick Ltd. Star Lane Brickworks	?	1991	2 ft (610 mm)	Great Wakering, England	Short line serving the clay pit and brickworks.
Carbis Brickworks Tramway	1883	1942	2 ft (610 mm)	Bugle, England	Hand and gravity worked line, 350 yards (320 m) long.
Castle Firebrick Company	about 1865	after 1920	2 ft (610 mm) (?)	Northrop, England	Internal brickworks line, worked by steam locomotives after World War I.
Cattybrook Brickworks railway	before 1900	after 1975	2 ft 10 1/2 in (876 mm)	Cattybrook, England	Line connecting clay pit to brickworks via an incline and diesel worked sections
Chilton Trinity Brickworks railway		after 1962	2 ft (610 mm)	Somerset, England	Locomotive worked clay pit line
Crowborough Brickworks	before 1930	1980	2 ft (610 mm)	Crowborough, England	Internal line at the brickworks, latterly worked by battery-electric locomotives.
Coronation Brickworks	1935	after 1969	2 ft 6 in (762 mm)	Elstow, England	London Brick Co Ltd brickworks near Bedford
Cuckmere Brickworks railway	?	about 1956	2 ft (610 mm)	Berwick Station, England	Clay pit line worked by internal combustion locomotives
DSF Refractories & Minerals Ltd, Friden Brickworks		after 1979	2 ft (610 mm)	Hartington, England	Brickworks line worked by internal combustion locomotives
Gatwick Brick Co. Ltd. Hookwood Brickworks		1968	2 ft (610 mm)	Gatwick, England	100-yard (91 m) long diesel locomotive worked line
George Jennings South Western Pottery	before 1937	1963	2 ft (610 mm)	Parkstone, England	Locomotive-worked line between the clay pit and the pottery
Gillingham Pottery, Brick & Tile Co. Ltd.	before 1901	1970	2 ft (610 mm)	Parkstone, England	Locomotive-worked line between the clay pit and the pottery
Goxhill Building Products Ltd. Barrow Haven Works		after 1979	2 ft (610 mm)	Barrow Haven, England	Brickworks line worked by internal combustion locomotives
Halstow Creek Brickworks	before 1900	1920s	2 ft (610 mm)	Lower Halstow, England	Served claypit and brickworks. Originally horse worked, one of the first electric locomotives was introduced here in 1902.
Hambledon Lane Brickworks	?	after 1983	2 ft (610 mm)	Nutbourne, England	
Henry Oakland and Son Ltd. Escrick Tileworks		after 1979	2 ft (610 mm)	York, England	Internal locomotive-worked line
Innes Lee Industries Campbell Brickworks		by 1979	2 ft (610 mm)	Staveley, England	Brickworks line worked by internal combustion locomotives
Littlethorpe Potteries		present	450 mm (17 23/32 in)	Littlethorpe, England	0.5-mile (0.8 km) long hand-worked line connecting the clay pits to the pottery
The London Brick Company No. 2 Works		after 1979	3 ft (914 mm)	Whittlesey, England	Locomotive-worked brickworks railway
The London Brick Company Arlesey Works		after 1979	2 ft (610 mm)	Bedford, England	Short locomotive-worked line on top of clay kilns
The London Brick Company Clock House Works		after 1968	2 ft (610 mm), 2 ft 11 in (889 mm) and 3 ft 11 in (1,194 mm)	Capel, England	Electric and diesel locomotive worked lines
The London Brick Company Fletton Works	1889?	after 1960	2 ft 11 in (889 mm)	Peterborough, England	Claypit and brickworks line of unusual gauge
The London Brick Company Warboys Works		1984	2 ft (610 mm)	Warboys, England	Locomotive-worked brickworks railway
Ludlay Brick & Tile Co.	?	1965	2 ft (610 mm)	Berwick, England	Internal brick works railway at Berwick in Sussex.
Lytchett Brick Co. Ltd.	before 1901	after 1966	2 ft (610 mm)	Upton, England	Locomotive-worked line between the clay pit and the pottery
Manfield Brickworks	before 1955	after 1963		Cranleigh, England	Diesel locomotive worked line, converted to cable haulage in 1955
Midhurst Whites	after 1913	1980	2 ft 6 in (762 mm)	Midhurst, England	Brickworks with three separate narrow gauge lines
Napton Brickworks railway		after 1961	16 in (406 mm)	Napton, England	Hand worked clay pit line
No. 5 Fireclay Mine railway	?	after 1968	2 ft 6 in (762 mm)	Micklam, England	Diesel locomotive worked line operated by the British Steel Corporation
North Holmwood Brickworks	?	1981	2 ft (610 mm)	Dorking, England	Internal system for the Redland Brick Co.'s clay pit and brickworks using diesel, battery-electric and incline cable haulage
Nutbourne Brickworks		after 1980	2 ft (610 mm)	Hambledon, Surrey, England	Diesel locomotive worked line connecting the brickworks and clay pits
Ockley (Surrey) Brick, Tile and Pottery Company Smokejacks Brickworks		after 1968	2 ft (610 mm)	Cranleigh, England	Battery-electric and diesel locomotive worked line
Ospringe Brickworks railway		after 1968	2 ft (610 mm)	Faversham, England	Extremely short line with one diesel locomotive
Rookley Brickworks		1972	2 ft (610 mm)	Newport, England	Diesel locomotive worked line in clay pit
Rosemary Brickworks railway	?	after 1970	2 ft (610 mm)	Cheslyn Hay, England	Locomotive worked line in clay pit leading to an incline to the brickworks
Rowlands Castle Brickworks	before 1932	after 1964	2 ft (610 mm)	Rowlands Castle, England	Hand-worked line in clay pit leading to cable hauled incline to brickworks
Smithbrook Brickworks (1936) Ltd.		after 1965	2 ft (610 mm)	Cranleigh, England	Mainly hand-worked line, with occasional use of a Lister diesel locomotive
Standard Brick & Sand Co. Ltd. Holmethorpe Brickworks	before 1911	1963	2 ft (610 mm)	Holmethorpe, England	An extensive steam and diesel locomotive worked clay tramway
Strensall Brickworks railway		by 1975		Strensall, England	Locomotive worked clay pit line
Storr Hill Brickworks railway	1869?	1981	2 ft 6 in (762 mm)	Wyke, England	An unusual chain-worked double track plateway only 250 yards (229 m) long.
Swallow's Tiles (Cranleigh) Ltd.	before 1953	after 1966	2 ft (610 mm)	Cranleigh, England	Mainly hand-worked clay pit line with cable hauled incline, and occasional use of a diesel locomotive
Warnham Brickworks	before 1909	1965	2 ft 6 in (762 mm)	Horsham, England	Internal line serving the brickworks and clay pit.
W. H. Collier Marks Tey Brickworks		after 1979	20 in (508 mm)	Marks Tey, England	Internal locomotive-worked line serving the brickworks.
Wheatly and Co. Ltd. Springfield Tileries		after 1979	2 ft (610 mm)	Stoke on Trent, England	Locomotive-worked railway
William Blythe (company) Barton Brick & Tile Yard		after 1979	2 ft (610 mm)	Barton-upon-Humber, England	Locomotive-worked line
William Blythe Far Ings Tileries		after 1979	2 ft (610 mm)	Barton-upon-Humber, England	Locomotive-worked line
Woodside Brickworks	before 1949	by 1967	?	Croydon, England	Internal brickworks railway notable for its two Sentinel high-pressure steam locos.

== Clay extraction ==
Name	Opened	Closed	Gauge	Location	Notes
APCM Alkerden Works	before 1900	1943	2 ft 8 1/2 in (825 mm)	Swanscombe, England	Large steam-worked clay pit line
BPCM Bean Works	1920	1964	2 ft (610 mm)	Bean, Kent, England	Short line serving a clay pit on the banks of the Thames
Bridgemarsh Brickfields Company	1870	1892	unknown	Bridgemarsh Island, Essex, England	Connected work to pier for transhipment onto Thames barges
C.W. Powder Co. Ltd	?	1942	2 ft (610 mm)	Treamble, Cornwall, England	A works producing Fuller's earth using two Kerr, Stuart and Company 0-4-2 tank engines acquired from Dolcoath mine in 1903 and 1911.
Far Ings Tileries	1905	2001	2 ft (610 mm)	Barton-upon-Humber, England	Late survivor of the clay tramways, including a cable-hauled incline and (diesel) locomotive worked sections.
Fayle's Tramway	1905	1971	3 ft 9 in (1,143 mm) until 1948; 1 ft 11 1/2 in (597 mm) after 1948	Norden, Dorset, England	Clay tramway that replaced the Middlesbere and Newton tramways. Remaining section around Norden regauged in 1948 to suit ex-WHR locomotive Russell and various diesels
Furzebrook Railway	1830	1968	4 ft (1,219 mm) until 1866 2 ft 8 1/2 in (825 mm) after 1866	Furzebrook, Dorset, England	Horse-hauled clay plateway, replaced in 1866 by steam-hauled industrial railway serving the clay pits around Creech Heath.
John Knowles Ltd. Woodville Clay Pits			18 in (457 mm)	Derbyshire, England	
Laporte Industries Ltd. Coombe Hay Mines		after 1979	1 ft 11 1/2 in (597 mm)	Bath, England	Fuller's earth mine with battery electric locomotives
Middlebere Tramway	1806	1907	3 ft 6 in (1,067 mm) (?)	Norden, Dorset, England	Horse-powered plateway serving clay pits near Corfe Castle.
Newton Tramway	1860 (?)	1905	3 ft 9 in (1,143 mm)	Poole Harbour, Dorset, England	Originally opened as Horse-drawn tramway until locomotive Tiny introduced around the 1870s, became part of Fayle's Tramway
Pentewan Railway	1829	1918	4 ft (1,219 mm), 2 ft 6 in (762 mm) after 1874	Pentewan, England	Initially horse-hauled, worked by steam locomotives after 1874. Connected St Austell to Pentewan
Thomas Marshall & Co (Loxley) Ltd. Storrs Bridge Fireclay Mine		after 1979	16 in (406 mm)	Loxley, England	Locomotive-worked underground railway
Thakeham Tiles	before 1937	1982	2 ft (610 mm)	Storrington, England	Short line serving the tile works
Watts Blake Bearne & Co. Ltd. West Golds Mine		after 1979	2 ft 6 in (762 mm)	Newton Abbott, England	Underground clay mine railway

=== China clay extraction ===
In Britain large deposits of Kaolinite (commonly known as "china clay") were found in Cornwall. Many industrial railways, both narrow gauge and standard gauge, were built to serve the china clay quarries and mines of this area.

Name	Opened	Closed	Gauge	Location	Notes
Beacon China Clay Kiln	1928	1963	2 ft (610 mm)	St Austell, England	Tramway from the kilns to a loading wharf next to the Beacon siding on the standard gauge line from Drinnick Mill and Burngullow.
Blackpool China Clay Pit		after 1956	1,000 mm (3 ft 3 3/8 in)	Trewoon, England	Tramway from the clay pits to a tip.
Charlestown No. 1 China Clay Kiln	1908	1960s	2 ft 4 in (711 mm)	St Austell, England	Two tramways running mainly in tunnels. Rails and wagons remain in the tunnels which were sealed when the kilns closed.
Hendra China Stone Quarry	1860s	after 1967	2 ft 3 in (686 mm)	Nanpean, England	Internal quarry tramway system with cable hauled inclines
Hendra Light Railway	1919	1939	2 ft (610 mm)	Nanpean, England	0.75-mile (1.2 km) long petrol locomotive worked railway connecting a loading wharf at the GWR to the Hendra china clay kilns.
Meeth Clay Company	1920	1970	2 ft (610 mm)	Woolladon, England	Short line carrying clay from the pits at Meeth. The first loco was an 0-6-0WT followed by a pair of Muir-Hill petrol locos and then a pair of Ruston & Hornsby diesel mechanical locos.
Melbur China Clay Pit		1920s ?	2 ft (610 mm) (?)	St Stephen-in-Brannel, England	Hand worked tramways
Pochins Tramway	1880	1933	3 ft (914 mm) (?)	Gothers, England	Railway connecting the Gothers china clay works with the GWR. May have been 3 ft 1 in (940 mm) gauge. The last of the four steam locomotives was scrapped on site in 1953.
Quarry Close China Stone Works	1863	1973	2 ft 3 in (686 mm)	Nanpean, England	A network of lines connecting several quarries to the GWR branch line from Drinnick Mill.
Redlake Tramway	1911	1932	3 ft (914 mm)	Dartmoor, England	A steam hauled line commencing on the edge of nowhere and terminating right in the middle of it
Restowrack China Clay Kiln	1907	1969	2 ft (610 mm)	Treviscoe, England	A hand-worked tramway from a loading wharf on the St. Dennis junction to Burngallow branch line into the kiln.
Tregargus China Stone Quarry	1890s	1968	2 ft (610 mm)	St Stephen-in-Brannel, England	A network of lines and inclines connecting the quarry with six mills.
Wheal Remfry China Clay Pit		after 1910		Retew, England	Horse worked internal tramway

== Sand and gravel extraction ==
The sand and gravel extraction industries made extensive use of narrow gauge railways, and several of these lasted into the 1980s – this was one of the last industries to make significant use of narrow gauge industrial railways in the UK.

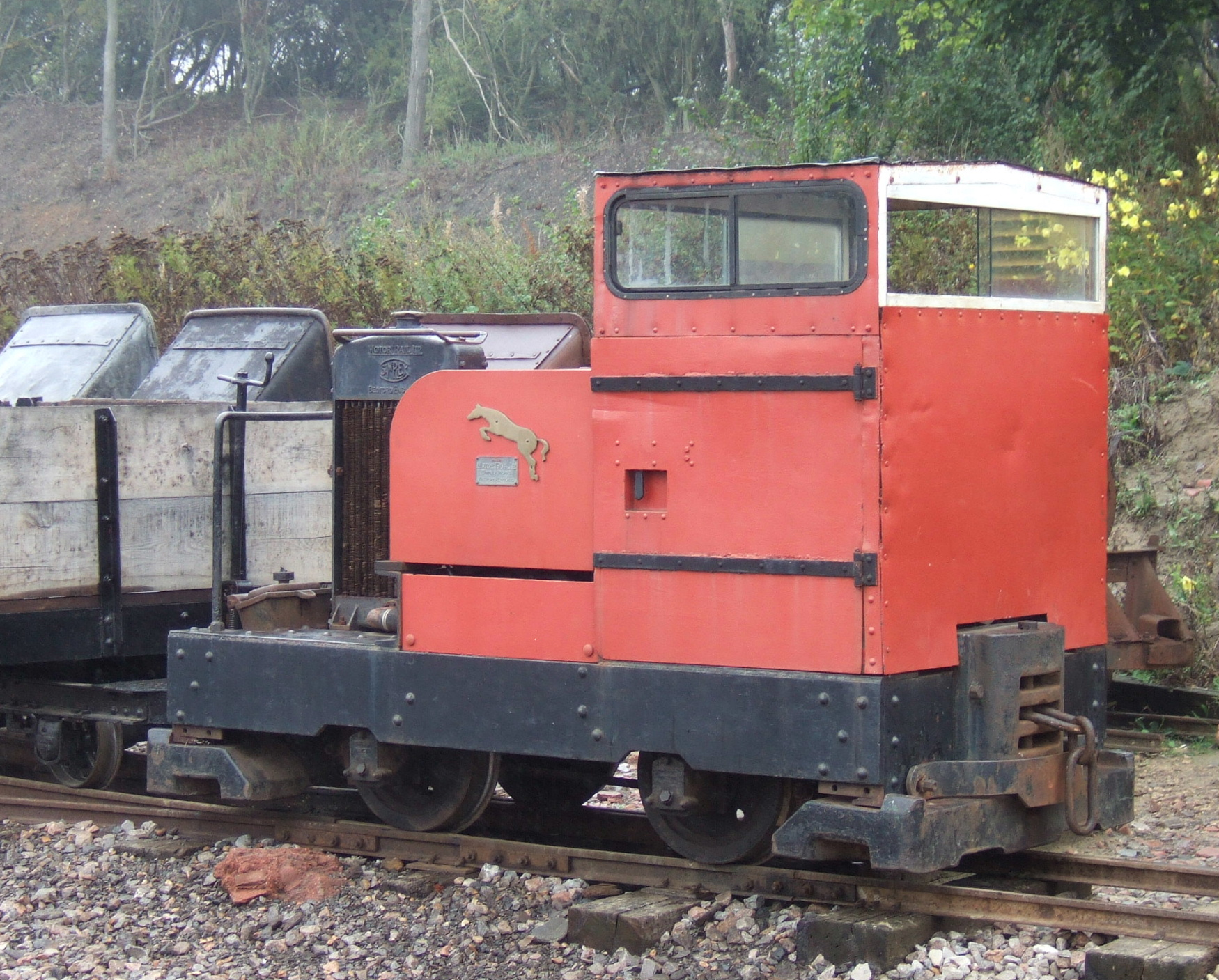
Leighton Buzzard Light Railway quarry locomotive Red Rum

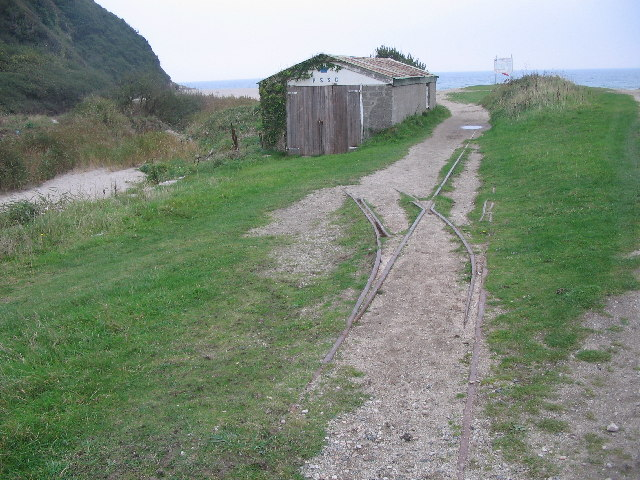
Pentewan Dock & Concrete Company locomotive shed

Name	Opened	Closed	Gauge	Location	Notes
Ace Sand and Gravel Co. Ltd. Marsh House quarries		by 1979	2 ft (610 mm)	Aore, England	Locomotive-worked line
Ballast Producers Ltd. Farnham Pits	before 1934	1952	2 ft (610 mm)	Farnham, England	Diesel locomotive worked line serving the gravel pits around Farnham
Bretts Faversham Sand Quarry railway	1930s (?)	1969 (?)	2 ft (610 mm)	Faversham, England	Sand and gravel haulage
Bretts Sturry Gravel railway	?	after 1968, by 1979	2 ft (610 mm)	Sturry, England	Served gravel pits on the River Stour
Biddenham Gravel Pit railway	by 1920	1930s	2 ft (610 mm)	Biddenham, England	Short horse-worked line serving Biddenham gravel pit, near Bedford.
British Industrial Sand Ltd. Middleton Towers railway		1977	2 ft (610 mm)	Kings Lynn, England	Extensive locomotive-worked sand quarry system. Five remaining diesel locomotives acquired by the LBLR in 1980.
Buckland Sand & Silica Co.	before 1934	after 1935	2 ft (610 mm)	Reigate, England	Short steam-hauled railway working sand from the pits to a private BR-worked siding
Croxden Gravel Ltd. Twelve Yards Road Pit	?	after 1979	2 ft (610 mm)	Irlam, England	Locomotive-worked line
Earls Barton sand quarry railway		after 1975	2 ft (610 mm)	Earls Barton, England	Small sand pit with internal locomotive worked line
East Sussex Transport and Trading Company	early 1930s	1964	2 ft (610 mm)	Cuckmere Haven, England	Hauled gravel extracted from the Cuckmere Haven beach to Exceat.
G.F.X Hartigan Ltd. Woad Farm Pits	1933	1959 (dismantled 1962)	2 ft (610 mm)	Newport Pagnell, England	Line serving gravel pits on the River Great Ouse. Used four diesel-mechanical locomotives.
Hall & Co.	before 1938	late 1960s	2 ft (610 mm)	Eastbourne, England	Shingle extraction railway on The Crumbles.
Hall & Ham River Co. North Station Pits	before 1964	1970	2 ft (610 mm)	Farnborough, England	Gravel extraction railway using diesel locomotives, at least two of which went to the Brockham Museum after the line closed.
Ham River Grit Co. Ltd. Bletchingley Pits		after 1963	2 ft (610 mm)	Redhill, England	Steam and diesel locomotive worked line
Ham River Grit Co. Ltd. Ham Pits	before 1932		2 ft (610 mm)	Kingston, England	Steam locomotive worked line
Heavers Gravel	1920s	1962	2 ft (610 mm)	Drayton, England	Internal gravel pit line
Hoveringham Gravels Ltd. Holme Pierrepont Pit		by 1979	2 ft (610 mm)	Holme Pierrepont, England	Internal gravel pit line
Hoveringham Gravels Ltd. Hoveringham Works		by 1979	2 ft (610 mm)	Hoveringham, England	
Inns & Co. Ltd. Farnborough Pits	before 1964	1967	2 ft (610 mm)	Farnborough, England	Diesel locomotive worked line
Inns & Co. Ltd. Savay Farm Gravel Pits	1949	about 1964	2 ft (610 mm)	Denham, England	Diesel locomotive worked line, east of the River Colne
Kempston gravel pit railway	1910s	about 1930	Probably 2 ft (610 mm)	Kempston, Bedfordshire	Short horse-drawn line connecting gravel pits by the River Great Ouse to the main road
Leighton Buzzard Light Railway	1919	1969	2 ft (610 mm)	Leighton Buzzard, England	Industrial railway that carried sand from the quarries around Leighton Buzzard
Marlow Sand and Gravel Co. Ltd. Westhorpe Pits	?	after 1979	2 ft (610 mm)	Little Marlow, England	Locomotive worked sand pit railway
Penfolds Ltd.	?	1963	2 ft (610 mm)	Eartham, England	Gravel extraction line
Pentewan Dock & Concrete Company	1939	1966	2 ft 6 in (762 mm)	Pentewan, England	Diesel locomotive worked line carrying sand from the shoreline dunes to the grading equipment. Used some of the trackbed of the earlier Pentewan Railway.
Piel & Walney Gravel Co. Ltd.	?	1962	3 ft (914 mm)	Barrow-in-Furness, England	Steam locomotive operated gravel line running to a pier at Walney.
Pilkington Glass Mill lane siding	?	by 1979	2 ft 1/8 in (613 mm)	Rainford, England	Locomotive-worked line
Pilkington Glass St. Helens quarry railway	?	after 1968	2 ft (610 mm)	St. Helens, England	Temporary locomotive-worked railways used for sand extraction for glass making
Twickenham Gravel Company Waltham Cross Gravel Pits Railway	1931	1964?	2 ft (610 mm)	Waltham Cross, England	Locomotive-worked railways connecting gravel pits and crushing plant
Thomas Patterson & Sons Weydon Hill sand pit	around 1919		2 ft (610 mm)	Farnham, Surrey, England	One of the first sand railways installed using ex-WDLR surplus equipment.

== Stone quarrying and mining ==
=== Slate ===
The most well-known of the British industrial narrow gauge railways were those serving the slate industry of north Wales. Many of the quarries had internal tramways and feeder lines connecting them to transhipment points on local railways, rivers, roads or coastal ports.

=== Granite ===
Name	Opened	Closed	Gauge	Location	Notes
Bearah Tor Quarry	?	late 1980s	2 ft (610 mm)	Liskeard, England	Short, hand worked internal quarry railway.
Brada Quarry railway	1935	1950s	2 ft (610 mm)	Bamburgh, England	Internal quarry system; locomotive worked until 1944 by two Lister petrol locos
Carreg-y-Llam Quarry railway	before 1900	1963	2 ft 6 in (762 mm) and 2 ft (610 mm)	Llithfaen, Wales	Original locomotive-worked 2 ft 6 in (762 mm) internal railway removed in 1949, but a new 2 ft (610 mm) gauge line was installed in the mid-1950s.
Ceiriog Granite Quarries railway	1914	1959	2 ft (610 mm)	Criggion, Wales	Internal quarry system worked by a single steam locomotive until 1921, when it was replaced by cable-haulage.
Charnwood Granite Quarries railway	1850s	1963	2 ft (610 mm)	Shepshed, England	Early horse worked quarry system; steam locomotives introduced in the late 1890s, replaced by internal combustion locos in 1937.
Cliffe Hill Mineral Railway	1896	1948	2 ft (610 mm)	Stanton under Bardon, England	Hauled stone from the Cliffe Hill Granite Quarry.
Groby Granite Quarries railway	1893	1943	2 ft (610 mm)	Groby, England	Extensive internal quarry system worked by five Hunslet steam locomotives.
Haytor Granite Tramway	by 1824	1858	4 ft 3 in (1,295 mm)	Dartmoor, England	Horse-drawn tramway serving the granite quarries around Haytor. Used granite "setts" as rails.
Jee's Hartshill Granite Quarry	?	1956?	2 ft 6 1/2 in (775 mm)	Nuneaton, England	Granite quarry with an extensive locomotive-worked tramway system.
Llanelwedd Granite Quarries railways	1929	after 1969	2 ft 6 in (762 mm) and 2 ft (610 mm)	Builth Wells, Wales	Internal quarry system; the 2 ft 6 in (762 mm) gauge line was horse-worked and closed in 1953; the 2 ft (610 mm) gauge was hand-worked apart from between 1953 and 1961 when a Lister locomotive was used.
Lunedale Whinstone Company railway	1878	around 1918	2 ft 6 in (762 mm)	Mickleton, England	Steam locomotive worked line connecting the quarry with a siding on the North Eastern Railway
Newcastle Granite and Whinstone Company	1902	1939	1 ft 11 1/2 in (597 mm)	Haltwhistle, England	Locomotive worked line connecting Cawfields Quarry to Haltwhistle station
Penmaenbach Stone quarry tramway	1875	1962	3 ft (914 mm)	Penmaenmawr, Wales	Smaller working beside the Penmaenmawr quarry with an internal tramway system and a series of inclines down to the coast.
Penmaenmawr & Welsh Granite Co.	1830s	1967	3 ft (914 mm)	Penmaenmawr, Wales	Extensive steam-hauled internal railway system in granite quarry complex.
Tonfanau quarry tramway	1892	1998	?	Tonfanau, Wales	
Trefor Quarry railway	1850	1962	1 ft 11 1/2 in (597 mm)	Llanaelhaearn, Wales	Internal quarry railway, with large incline to a steam locomotive worked pier branch

=== Other stone ===
Name	Opened	Closed	Gauge	Location	Notes
Basset mines Ltd	1896	1918	20 in (508 mm)	Redruth, Cornwall, England	Three lines linking the shaft to the two stamps. An 0-4-0WT by Orenstein & Koppel worked the line throughout its existence.
Cloughfold to Ding Quarry tramway	1867	1920	3 ft (914 mm)	Cloughfold, England	Extensive tramway system serving the Brow Edge, Great Height, Ding and Hurdles sandstone quarries. Used at least one steam locomotive.
Downhead Basalt Quarry	by 1904	1925	2 ft (610 mm)	Downhead, England	Steam locomotive worked quarry line
East Cornwall Mineral Railway	1872	1891/1908	3 ft 6 in (1,067 mm)	Callington, England	Early steam-worked railway serving the iron ore and stone quarries around Callington.
Harecrag Quarry railway		1969	2 ft (610 mm)	Shilbottle, England	Roadstone quarry operated by Northumberland County Council operated by six Hunslet diesel locomotives.
Hall Fold to Walstead Clough tramway	After 1844	By 1912	Approximately 2 ft 6 in (762 mm)	Haslingden, England	Horse- and locomotive- worked tramway linking the sandstone quarries of Thurns Head, Ragstone Brow and Ab Top
Ingleton Granite Quarry Tramway	1887	1930s	?3 ft (914 mm)?	Chapel le Dale, England	Steam-drawn tramway and rope-hauled incline built to transport Silurian gritstone, known locally as "Ingleton granite", down the valley to Ingleton
Levant Mine	Pre-1820	1930	15 in (381 mm)	St Just in Penwith, Cornwall, England	A line laid in the long underground gallery experimentally used an 0-2-2WT by A. Bickle of Plymouth in 1892.
Lochaline quartz sand mine railway	1943	1963	?2 ft 4 in (711 mm)?	Lochaline, Scotland	Diesel worked railway linking the sandstone mine at Lochaline with a pier on the Sound of Mull
Long Rake Spar mine		after 1979	17 in (432 mm)	Youlgreave, England	Underground aggregates mine railway operated by battery-electric locomotives.
Lyke Wake Moor Tramway	Around 1915	1930s	?	Osmotherley, England	Horse-hauled tramway running one and a half miles from a ganister quarry on Lyke Wake Moor to sidings on the main line near Beacon Howe, via a self-acting incline. Some rails and sleepers still in situ in 2003.
Monks Park Mine	before 1991	present	750 mm (2 ft 5 1/2 in)	Corsham, England	Bath stone underground mine. Surface lines were locomotive worked until 1991
Musbury Height Tramway	1877	mid 1920s	3 ft (914 mm)	Haslingden, England	Long locomotive-worked tramway serving a sandstone quarry, reached by a long incline. Also known as the "Haslingden Grane Tramway"
Penlee Quarry railway	about 1900	1972	2 ft (610 mm)	Newlyn, England	Aggregate quarry served by England's most westerly railway and one of the last industrial narrow gauge railways to operate. Used both steam and diesel locomotives.
St. Keverne & Associated Quarries	1912	1958	2 ft (610 mm)	Porthoustock, England	Roadstone quarries connected by a network of railways. At least two lightweight Lister locomotives and several cable inclines were used.
Sidmouth Harbour Railway	1836	1838	3 ft 6 in (1,067 mm)	Sidmouth, England	To quarry stone for an intended harbour at Sidmouth, that never came to fruition.
Stepper Point Quarry	1918	1948	2 ft (610 mm)	Stepper Point, England	Exploiting a previous quarry working for roadstone. Used an 0-4-0 locomotive to move stone from the crusher to a schute that supplied barges.
Titterstone Clee Hill Quarry railway	before 1910	1952	3 ft (914 mm)	Ludlow, England	Dhustone quarry with an internal horse worked railway; steam locomotive worked from 1910. Included a 1 mile long incline
Tregongeeves Quarry	1931	1961	2 ft (610 mm)	St. Mewan, England	Roadstone quarry with cable incline and three petrol locomotives.
West of England Quarry		by 1979	2 ft (610 mm)	St. Keverne, England	Aggregates quarry with a short locomotive-worked line
Woodsmith Mine Tunnel	c. 2021	Still open	900 mm (2 ft 11 7/16 in)	North Yorkshire, England	Links Woodsmith Mine polyhalite operation with export terminal on Teesside

== Coal ==
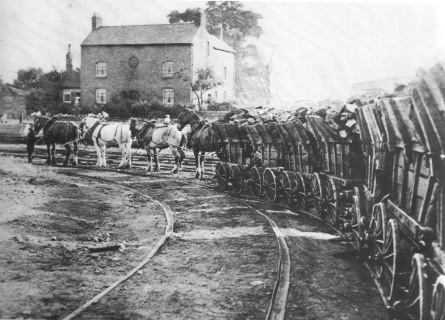
Little Eaton Gangway

The British coal mining industry made extensive use of narrow gauge railways, particularly underground where the restricted size of the tunnels meant that narrow gauge lines were and are particularly well suited. Many National Coal Board (NCB) mines used railways both underground and in the stock yards above ground. There were also many short lines at private mines, particularly in south Wales and the Forest of Dean regions.

Name	Opened	Closed	Gauge	Location	Notes
Ayle Colliery	1932	open 2015	2 ft (610 mm), 2 ft 6 in (762 mm), 19 1/2 in (495 mm), 1 ft 10 in (559 mm)	Alston, England	Private colliery with locomotive-worked mine railway.
Bryn Oer Tramway	1815	1865	3 ft 6 in (1,067 mm)	Talybont on Usk, Wales	Early horse-drawn tramway
Copeland District Council Wellington Colliery		after 1987	2 ft 6 in (762 mm)	Whitehaven Harbour, England	Private colliery with preserved locomotive
Coventry Colliery	1911	1991	2 ft (610 mm)	Keresley, England	
Deep Navigation Colliery	1872	1991	2 ft (610 mm)	Treharris, South Wales	
Doe Lee Colliery	before 1979	Out of use by 1987	2 ft (610 mm)	Chesterfield, England	Underground locomotive worked mine railway
Flow Edge Colliery	before 1979	by 1987	1 ft 10 in (559 mm)	Alston, England	Small battery-electric locomotive worked mine railway
Foxcote Colliery	1890	1931	2 ft 8 1/2 in (825 mm)	Chilcompton, England	Steam locomotive worked tramway
Gleision Colliery	1980	?	2 ft (610 mm)	Between Godre'r Graig and Cilybebyll, South Wales	
Hope Level Mine	?	1988	?	Stanhope, England	Small mine operation with loco-worked railway
Huish Colliery	after 1824	1912		Radstock, England	Internal tramway
Kilmersdon Colliery	before 1886	1973	2 ft 8 1/2 in (825 mm)	Radstock, England	Internal tramway
Little Eaton Gangway	1795	1908	3 ft 6 in (1,067 mm)	Little Eaton, England	Very early horse-drawn tramway serving the collieries north of Derby
Lower Writhlington Colliery	1867	1973	2 ft 8 1/2 in (825 mm)	Chilcompton, England	Steam locomotive worked tramway
Mendip Shaft	?	1968	2 ft 9 in (838 mm)	Chilcompton, England	Private colliery with surface and underground tramway
Moorside Mining	?	1992	1 ft 10 in (559 mm)	Eckington, Derbyshire, England	Private colliery, purchased twelve battery electric locomotives from South Crofty mine in 1992
NCB BatesColliery		1986		Blyth, England	Diesel locomotive worked underground colliery system
NCB Berwick Drift Stockyard	?	2005	3 ft (914 mm)	Lynemouth, England	One of several locomotive-worked stock yard railways in the British coal industry.
NCB Clockburn Drift Mine railway	?	after 1968	3 ft 6 in (1,067 mm)	County Durham, England	Substantially built double-track line for coal haulage from the main mine adit.
NCB Gascoigne Wood Colliery railway	?	?	2 ft 6 in (762 mm)	South Milford, England	Underground mine railway
NCB Harworth Colliery railway	?	?	2 ft 6 in (762 mm)	Bircotes, England	Underground mine railway
NCB Hentley Training Centre	?	1991	3 ft (914 mm)	Hentley, England	Test incline and locomotive worked lines
NCB Kellingley Colliery railway	?	?	2 ft 6 in (762 mm)	Kellingley, England	Underground mine railway
NCB Kellingley Training Centre railway	?	?	2 ft 6 in (762 mm)	Kellingley, England	Mine training railway
NCB Lewis Merthyr Colliery railway	?	1983	2 ft 10 1/2 in (876 mm)	Rhondda, Wales	Stock yard line worked by diesel locomotives
NCB Parkside Colliery railway	?	after 1972	2 ft 6 in (762 mm)	Newton-le-Willows, England	Stock yard line worked by diesel locomotives
NCB Prince of Wales Colliery railway	?	?	2 ft 6 in (762 mm)	Pontefract, England	Underground mine railway
NCB Riccall Colliery railway	?	?	2 ft 6 in (762 mm)	Riccall, England	Underground mine railway
NCB Stillingfleet Colliery railway	?	?	2 ft 6 in (762 mm)	Stillingfleet, England	Underground mine railway
NCB Tilmanston Colliery		1986	2 ft (610 mm)	Eythorne, England	Modern underground colliery system
NCB Wentworth Drift Mine railway	1947	1955	2 ft (610 mm)	Wentworth, England	Locomotive-worked surface and underground railway system
NCB Wistow Colliery railway	?	?	2 ft 6 in (762 mm)	Wistow, England	Underground mine railway
New Peacock Hay Colliery railway	?	?	1 ft 10 in (559 mm)	Harecastle, England	Cable-hauled incline from a small private coal mine
New Rock Colliery		1968	2 ft 8 1/2 in (825 mm)	Chilcompton, England	Internal tramway
Norton Hill Colliery		1966	2 ft 4 in (711 mm)	Midsomer Norton, England	Surface and underground tramways
Pensford Colliery	1910	1957	2 ft (610 mm)	Pensford, England	Mile long railway connecting the colliery to Bromley station. Initially steam locomotive worked, later cable hauled.
Pentwyn No.3 Mine	?	after 1994	2 ft (610 mm)	Ystalyfera, Wales	One of the last coal mines using pit ponies on a railway.
Saundersfoot Railway	1829	1939	4 ft (1,219 mm)	Saundersfoot, Wales	Early industrial railway hauling coal.
Severn and Wye Railway	1801	1869	3 ft 6 in (1,067 mm)	Forest of Dean, England	Coal and iron hauling tramway, eventually replaced by a broad gauge line.
Tranent to Cockenzie Waggonway	1722	1880	3 ft 3 in (991 mm)	East Lothian, Scotland	Built to carry coal from mines at Tranent to salt pans at Cockenzie and later to the harbour at Port Seton. The original wooden rails were replaced with iron in 1816 and the line was converted to standard gauge in 1880.
Weardale Minerals	?	1988	2 ft (610 mm)	Cambokeels, England	Colliery railway
Weardale Mining and Processing	?	1988	2 ft (610 mm)	West Blackdene, England	Colliery railway

== Peat extraction ==
Name	Opened	Closed	Gauge	Location	Notes
Country Kitchen Foods Lindow Moss railway	?	after 1987	2 ft (610 mm)	Wilmslow, England	Peat moss tramway using diesel locomotives.
Cumberland Moss Litter railway		after 1979	2 ft (610 mm)	Wigton, England	Extremely lightly laid temporary lines for peat extraction
Eden Park Nurseries	1987	?	2 ft (610 mm)	Wark Forest, England	A relatively new narrow gauge industrial railway.
Haversham House Farm railway	?	?	2 ft (610 mm)	Lancaster, England	Turf farm railway
Joseph Metcalf Ltd.	?	1999 ?	2 ft (610 mm)	Irlam, England	Lightly laid peat tramway using modern diesel locomotives.
L&P Ltd. Creca Moss	?	Present?	2 ft (610 mm)	Annan, Scotland	Peat extraction line
L&P Ltd. Letham Moss	?	Present ?	2 ft (610 mm)	Airth, Scotland	Peat extraction line
L&P Ltd. Nutberry Works	?	Present ?	2 ft (610 mm)	Eastriggs, Scotland	Peat extraction line near Gretna Green.
Lenzie Peat Railway	?	1966	2 ft (610 mm)	Lenzie, Scotland	Works owned by the Peat Development Co Ltd. Worked by Lister petrol locomotives, works numbers 26286 of 1944 and 29890 of 1946
Moodiesburn Peat Works railway	?	?	2 ft (610 mm)	Glenboig, Scotland	Locomotive worked line a few hundred yards long
Richardson's Peat Work railway	?	after 1979	2 ft 6 in (762 mm)	Longtown, England	Peat tramway in Cumbria.
Fisons Ltd. Cumbria Peat Works	after 1979	after 1987	2 ft (610 mm)	Kirkbride, England	Locomotive-worked peat railway.
Fisons Ltd. Eclipse Peat Works	1922	after 1979	2 ft (610 mm)	Meare, England	Locomotive-worked peat railway.
Fisons Ltd. Hatfield Peat Works	1890s	2006	3 ft (914 mm)	Hatfield, England	Some 8 miles (13 km) of permanent track prior to closure.
Fisons Ltd. Swinefleet Peat Works	1890s	2002	3 ft (914 mm)	Goole, England	Peat works railway employing at least 11 internal combustion locomotives. Two new Schoma locomotives delivered in 1989
Solway Moss railway	?	after 1987	2 ft 6 in (762 mm)	Cumbria, England	Peat tramway with at least 10 4wDM locomotives on site in 1987
George Watson & Sons Middlemuir peat railway	approx. 1949	1989	2 ft (610 mm)	Fraserburgh, Scotland	Peat tramway with three Lister locomotives in 1989
White Moss Peat Co. Ltd. Simonswood Moss		after 1979	2 ft (610 mm)	Kirkby, England	Locomotive-worked line
White Moss Peat Co. Ltd. White Moss Works railway		1958	2 ft (610 mm)	Alsager, England	Very lightweight line of less than 1 mile length; worked using Lister locomotives
William Sinclair Horticultural Auchencorth Moss railway	?	?	2 ft 6 in (762 mm)	Leadburn, Scotland	
William Sinclair Horticultural Bolton Fell railway	?	Present	2 ft (610 mm)	Hethersgill, England	Lightly laid, locomotive worked peat extraction line.
William Sinclair Horticultural Cladence Moss railway	1998	Present	2 ft 6 in (762 mm)	East Kilbride, Scotland	Lightly laid, locomotive worked peat extraction line.
William Sinclair Horticultural Ryflat Moss railway	late 1990s	Present ?	2 ft 6 in (762 mm)	Strathclyde, Scotland	
William Sinclair Horticultural Springfield Moss railway	?	?	2 ft 6 in (762 mm)	Leadburn, Scotland	
Wilmslow Peat Farm railway	before 1979	2000	2 ft (610 mm)	Wilmslow, England	Locomotive-worked peat tramway near Manchester

== Other mineral extraction ==
Name	Opened	Closed	Gauge	Location	Notes
Blue Circle Industries Ltd. Kilvington Gypsum Works		after 1979	3 ft (914 mm)	Newark, England	Locomotive-worked railway.
British Gypsum Mines Ltd. Gotham Works		after 1979	2 ft 2 in (660 mm)	Gotham, Nottinghamshire, England	Underground locomotive-worked railway.
British Gypsum Mines Ltd. Mountfield Works	1945	after 1966	2 ft (610 mm)	Mountfield, England	Inclined adit and works railway.
British Steel Corporation Beaumont Fluor Mine		after 1979	2 ft (610 mm)	Allenheads, England	Underground locomotive-worked fluor mine.
British Steel Corporation Blackdene Fluor Mine		after 1979	2 ft (610 mm)	Ireshopeburn, England	Underground locomotive-worked fluor mine.
British Steel Corporation Blanchland Fluor Mines		after 1979	2 ft (610 mm)	Ireshopeburn, England	Underground locomotive-worked fluor mine.
Hagdale Chromate Railway	1907	1937	2 ft 6 in (762 mm)	Isle of Unst, Scotland	Remote line hauling chromite from quarries to a pier on Balta Sound. Worked by gravity and horse-power.
J. Parish Loam works	1849	1957	4 ft (1,219 mm)	Erith, England	Steam locomotive hauled railway moving loam for metal casting molds.
Laporte Industries Ltd. Ladywash Mine		after 1987	18 in (457 mm)	Eyam, England	Underground fluorite mine with locomotive worked railway
Laporte Industries Ltd. Sallet Hole Mine		after 1987	2 ft (610 mm)	Stoney Middleton, England	Underground fluorite mine with locomotive worked railway
Laporte Industries Ltd. Watersaw Rake Mine		after 1987	2 ft (610 mm)	Stoney Middleton, England	Underground mine with battery electric locomotive worked railway
Lealt Valley Diatomite Railway	1890	1915	2 ft (610 mm)	Isle of Skye, Scotland	Remote line hauling "diatomic earth" which was used in the manufacture of dynamite. Steam worked for a short while.
Scropton Tramway	1889	1949	3 ft (914 mm)	Scropton, England	Steam hauled tramway serving Gypsum mines south of Scropton station.

== Metal mining ==
=== Tin, lead and zinc ===
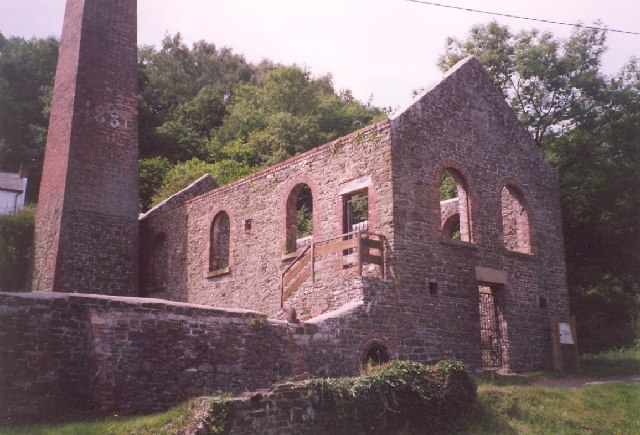
Snailbeach Lead Mine

Name	Opened	Closed	Gauge	Location	Notes
Ardda Tramway	1853	1864	probably 2 ft (610 mm)	Dolgarrog, Wales	Iron sulphide mine with 1 mile long tramway
Athole G. Allen Ltd. Closehouse Barytes Mine		after 1979	2 ft (610 mm) and 19 1/2 in (495 mm)	Middleton-in-Teesdale, England	Locomotive-worked barytes mine.
Basset Mines Tramway	before 1907	1918	20 in (508 mm)	Redruth, England	Steam locomotive worked line connecting the West Basset Mine and the stamps at Carnike
Botallack Mine	before 1864		800 mm (2 ft 7 1/2 in)	St Just, England	300-yard surface line and cliff-side inclines into the mine.
Cae-Coch Mine railway	1860	1919	unknown	Trefriw, Wales	Tramway serving a remote iron sulphide mine
Camborne Mines Ltd. Pendarves Mine		after 1979	600 mm (1 ft 11 5/8 in)	Camborne, England	Underground railway serving the Pendarves tin mine
Carrock Fell mine		after 1979	2 ft (610 mm)	Mungrisdale, England	Lead mine with a single battery-electric locomotive
Cononish Farm Mine railway	?	Present?	2 ft (610 mm)	Tyndrum, Scotland	Mine railway in intermittent use.
Cornwall Tin and Mining Corporation Mount Wellington Mine		by 1979	2 ft (610 mm)	Twelveheads, Cornwall, England	Underground Tin mine
Cornish Hush Mine railway	?	Late 1970s	2 ft (610 mm)	Bishop Auckland, Scotland	Railway at a Fluorspar mine, operated by a battery electric locomotive
Force Crag Mine Ltd. Braithwaite Barytes Mine		after 1987	2 ft (610 mm)	Keswick, England	Railway at a Barytes mine, operated by a battery electric locomotive
Frongoch Lead Mine		before 1903	unknown	Ceredigion, Wales	Tramway at a Lead Zinc mine
Geevor Tin Mines Ltd. Pendeen Mine	1911	1991	18 in (457 mm)	St Just, England	Extensive underground tin mine railway. Part of the site, with reinstated tramway, has been reopened as the Geevor Tin Mines Museum.
Glenn Sannox Railway	around 1900	late 1940s	unknown	Sannox, Arran	Incline and pier railway serving a barytes mine.
Great Laxey Mines Railway	by 1854	1929	19 in (483 mm)	Laxey, Isle of Man	Lead, zinc and silver mines with steam locomotive worked railway by the Laxey Wheel.
Mineral Industries Ltd. Scraithole Mine		after 1979, by 2003	18 in (457 mm)	Nenthead, England	Zinc mine with underground locomotive-worked railway
Parc Mine tramway	1951	after 1960	2 ft (610 mm)	Trefriw, Wales	Lead mines with extensive underground locomotive-hauled railway system.
Rosevale Historical Mining Company	1974	present	2 ft (610 mm) and 18 in (457 mm)	Zennor, England	Newly re-opened tin mine using battery-electric locomotives
Snailbeach District Railways	1873	1961	2 ft 3 3/4 in (705 mm) or 2 ft 4 in (711 mm)	Snailbeach, England	Served the lead and other mineral mines around Snailbeach.
South Crofty Mine	1900	1998	1 ft 10 in (559 mm) and 18 in (457 mm)	Camborne, England	Extensive tin mine with internal railway. The mine was re-opened in 2001 although currently without the use of railway transport.
Swiss Aluminium Mining (UK) Ltd. Burtree Pasture Mine		after 1979	2 ft (610 mm)	Cowshill, England	Fluorite mine using battery-electric locomotives
Swiss Aluminium Mining (UK) Ltd. Cambokeels Mine		after 1979	600 mm (1 ft 11 5/8 in)	Stanhope, England	Fluorite mine using battery-electric locomotives
Swiss Aluminium Mining (UK) Ltd. Redburn Mine		after 1979	2 ft (610 mm)	Stanhope, England	Fluorite mine using battery-electric locomotives
Swiss Aluminium Mining (UK) Ltd. Stanhope Burn Mine		after 1979	2 ft (610 mm)	Stanhope, England	Fluorite mine using battery-electric locomotives
Weardale Fluorspar Ltd. Frasers Grove Mine		after 1989	2 ft (610 mm)	County Durham, England	Fluorspar mine with at least 15 battery electric locomotives on site in 1989
Wheal Jane Ltd. Clemo's Shaft	1965	1992	2 ft (610 mm)	Baldhu, England	Locomotive-worked Cornish tin mine.
Wheal Pendarves Ltd. Wheal Pendarves mine		after 1987	600 mm (1 ft 11 5/8 in)	Camborne, England	Locomotive-worked Cornish tin mine.
Willoughby Mine Tramway	1877	1914	1 ft 10 in (559 mm)	Trefriw, Wales	Tramway serving lead and zinc mine. An early (1904) Kerr Stuart locomotive worked here.

=== Iron ===
Mainly ironstone quarries

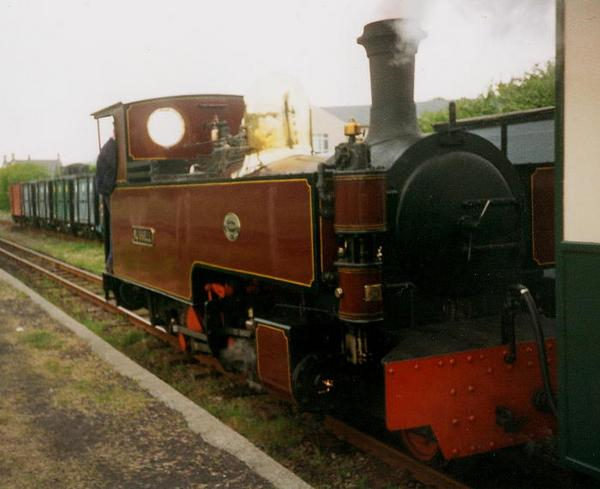
Russell that ran at the Brymbo Ironstone Railway

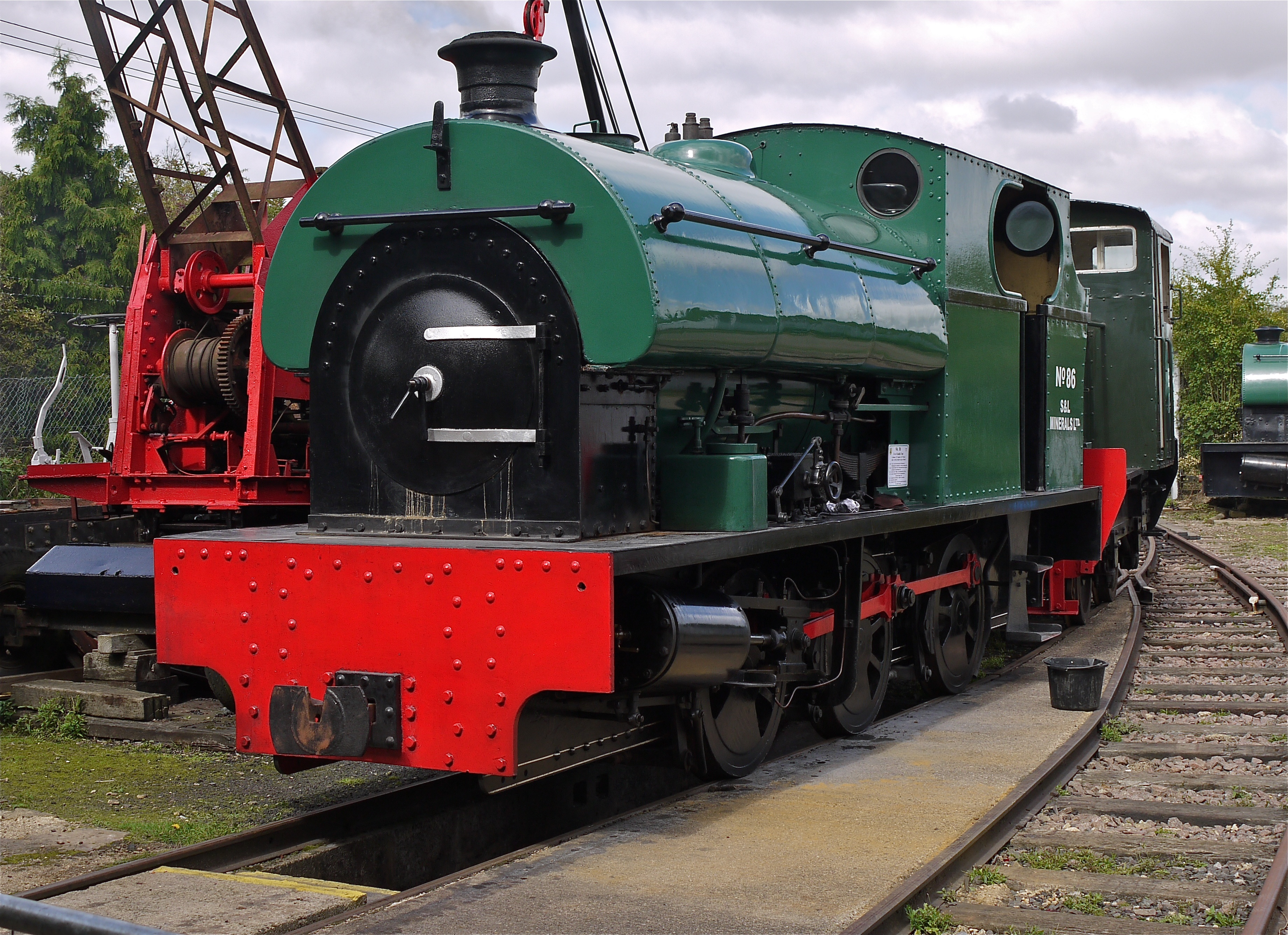
Peckett metre gauge locomotive from the Wellingborough Iron Company tramway

Name	Opened	Closed	Gauge	Location	Notes
British Steel Corporation Beckermet Ore Mine railway		after 1979	2 ft 6 in (762 mm)	Beckermet, England	Underground mine railway.
Brymbo Ironworks railway	1899	1946	1 ft 11 1/2 in (597 mm)	Hook Norton, England	Major ironstone quarry and calcination works served by a steam-hauled railway.
Colton Iron Ore Mine	1880?		2 ft (610 mm)	Brendon Hill, England	Steam locomotive worked tramway connecting the iron ore mine with the West Somerset Mineral Railway
Eastwell Quarries	1880s (?)	1958	3 ft (914 mm)	Eastwell, Leicestershire, England	Extensive system of steam-hauled lines with a cable-hauled incline.
Waltham Iron Ore Tramway	1884	1958	1,000 mm (3 ft 3 3/8 in)	Eaton, Leicestershire, England	System of tramways connecting the pits of the Waltham Iron Company to the Great Northern Railway's Eaton Branch Railway.
Finedonhill Tramway	1874	late 1940s	2 ft 6 in (762 mm)	Finedon, England	Cable-hauled ironstone quarry tramway
Florence Iron Ore Mine railway	?	after 1987	2 ft 6 in (762 mm)	Egremont, England	Underground mine tramway worked by battery-electric locomotives
Grinkle Mine Tramway	1875	1930	3 ft (914 mm)	Roxby and Port Mulgrave, North Yorkshire	3 miles (4.8 km) tramway connecting mine with harbour at Port Mulgrave
Irchester Quarries railway	1871	1884	3 ft 8 1/4 in (1,124 mm)	Irchester, England	Early ironstone quarry system using one steam locomotive.
Irthlingborough Quarries railway		after 1958	3 ft (914 mm)	Irthlingborough, England	Underground mines using electric locomotives with a double-track adit to the surface
Kettering Ironstone Railway	1879	1962	3 ft (914 mm)	Kettering, England	Extensive system of steam-hauled lines serving the ironstone quarries west of Kettering.
Midland Brick Quarries	after 1901	by 1940	2 ft (610 mm)	Wellingborough, England	Small hand-worked ironstone quarry line
Myers Burn Mine	1985	1988	?	Eaglesham, Scotland	Small iron pyrites mine with underground railway system.
Rosedale Branch			? converted to 1,435 mm (4 ft 8 1/2 in) standard gauge		
Raasay Iron Mines	1915	1919	2 ft 3 in (686 mm)	Raasay, off Skye, Inner Hebrides, Scotland	Electric-powered cable haulage connecting mine to pier
Scaldwell Ironstone Quarries		1963	3 ft (914 mm)	Brixworth, England	Steam locomotive worked connecting the ironstone quarry south of Scaldwell to the British Rail branch to Lamport
South Hill Farm Quarries	1912	about 1926	probably 2 ft 6 in (762 mm)	Finedon, England	Locomotive worked ironstone quarry tramway connected to Finedonhill Tramway
Neilson's Tramway	1881	1929	2 ft 4 in (711 mm)	Finedon, England	Cable-hauled tramway with horse-worked upper section, to the Thingdon Mines
Tir Stent mine	pre-1861	1913 ?	18 in (457 mm)	Dolgelley, Wales	Horse worked iron ore mine tramway
Wellingborough Tramway	1874	1966	1,000 mm (3 ft 3 3/8 in)	Finedon, England	The last narrow gauge steam hauled ironstone railway in England. There were also 2 ft 4 in (711 mm) gauge feeder lines at the quarries, latterly worked by diesel locos.

=== Gold ===
Name	Opened	Closed	Gauge	Location	Notes
Clogau mine	1880s	Present	2 ft (610 mm)	Bontddu Wales	Hand-worked gold mine railway, in intermittent use
Gwynfynydd mine		Present	2 ft (610 mm)	Dolgellau Wales	Hand-worked gold mine railway, in intermittent use

== See also ==
- British industrial narrow-gauge railways
- British narrow-gauge railways
- Industrial railway

== Bibliography ==
- "Narrow Gauge Railway Museum's list of railways".
- "List of British narrow gauge steam locomotives". Archived from the original on 21 October 2008.
- Booth, A.W. (1998). Peat Railways of Thorne and Hatfield Moors. Industrial Railway Society. ISBN 1-901556-04-2.
- Crumbleholme, Roger & Kirtland, Terry (1981). steam '81. George Allen & Unwin. ISBN 0-04-385082-0.
- Dean, Ian; Neale, Andrew; Smith, David (1983). Industrial Railways of the South-East. Middleton Press. ISBN 0-906520-09-6.
- Hateley, Roger (1977). Industrial Locomotives of South Western England. Greenford: Industrial Railway Society. ISBN 0-901096-23-7.
- Lee, Charles E. (1945). Narrow-Gauge Railways in North Wales. The Railway Publishing Co. Ltd.
- Macmillan, Nigel S.C. (1970). The Campbeltown & Machrihanish Light Railway. David & Charles: Newton Abbot. ISBN 1-871980-17-8.
- Richards, Alun John (2001). The Slate Railways of Wales (1st. ed.). Llanrwst, Wales: Gwasg Carreg Gwalch. ISBN 0-86381-689-4.
- Robertson, Leslie S.; Neale, Andrew (1988). Narrow Gauge Railways - Two Feet and Under (2nd ed.). Croydon, Surrey: Plateway Press. ISBN 0-9511108-4-5.
- Stoyel, B.D. & Kidner R.W. (1973). The Cement Railways of Kent. The Oakwood Press. ISBN 0-85361-370-2.
- Talbot, Edward; Taylor, Clive (2005). The Crewe Works Narrow Gauge System (2nd ed.). Croydon, Surrey: The London & North Western Railway Society. ISBN 0954695119.
- Tonks, Eric (May 1990). The Ironstone Quarries of the Midlands Part 4: The Wellingborough Area. Cheltenham: Runpast Publishing. ISBN 1-870-754-042.
- Narrow Gauge News, the journal of the Narrow Gauge Railway Society
