= Wellingborough Loco Shed =

Stabling point in Wellingborough, England

- Interactive map of Wellingborough Loco Shed

Location
- Location: Wellingborough, Northamptonshire
- Coordinates: 52.307678°N 0.675435°W
- OS grid: SP904685

Characteristics
- Owner: British Rail
- Depot code: WO (1973 - 1987)
- Type: Diesel

History
- Opened: 1868
- Closed: 1987
- Former depot code: 15A (1 January 1948 - 31 August 1963) 15B (1 September 1963 - 5 May 1973)

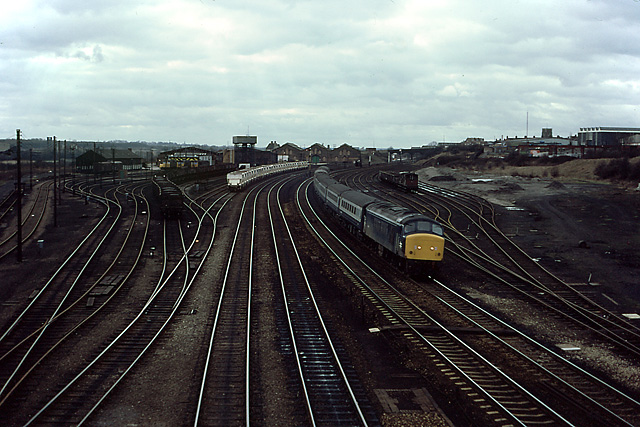
Wellingborough loco shed seen from Finedon Road overbridge. The sidings on the left lead into the sheds

Wellingborough Loco Shed was a stabling point located in Wellingborough, Northamptonshire, England. The depot was situated on the Midland Main Line and was located just north of Wellingborough station.

The depot code is WO.

== History ==
The sidings at the north end of the loco sheds once served the Finedonhill Tramway a narrow-gauge railway that carried iron ore from quarries to the south of Finedon to the sidings. The tramway was in operation from 1875 to 1926. Another narrow gauge tramway, the Wellingborough Tramway passed under the railway immediately north of the Finedon Road overbridge. This line operated until 1966 and was the last narrow-gauge railway operating in The Midlands iron fields.

Before its closure in 1984, Class 08 shunters, 25, British Rail Class 31, 45 and 46 locomotives, British Rail class 47 could be seen at the depot.
