= Scropton Tramway =

Industrial railway in England

Coordinates: 52°51′52″N 1°42′46″W

Overview
- Headquarters: Scropton
- Locale: England
- Dates of operation: 1889–1949
- Successor: Abandoned

Technical
- Track gauge: 3 ft (914 mm)
- Length: 1½ miles

The Scropton Tramway was a British industrial 3 ft (914 mm) narrow gauge railway connecting several gypsum mines with the North Staffordshire Railway station at Scropton in Staffordshire. It was also used to transport munitions during World War II.

== Locomotives ==
Name	Builder	Type	Date	Works number	Notes
	W.G. Bagnall	0-4-0T	Late 1880s	1050	Small inverted saddle tank locomotive; sold by 1894 to Joseph Boam Ltd., Norfolk
	W.G. Bagnall	0-4-0T	1892	1232	Larger version of the first Bagnall locomotive; sold by 1902 to the Manchester Corporation Rivers Department
	Lowca Engineering	0-4-0ST	1884	241	Scrapped 1950
	Manning Wardle	0-4-0ST	1888		Built for the construction of the Ashworth Moor Reservoir; purchased in 1913
	Manning Wardle	0-4-0ST	1888		Built for the construction of the Ashworth Moor Reservoir; purchased in 1913. Sold for scrap, 1946
Prince Charlie	Hunslet	4-6-0T	1917	1276	Built as a 2 ft (610 mm) gauge locomotive for the War Department Light Railways. Purchased in 1947; scrapped 1950
Vyrnwy	Orenstein and Koppel	0-4-0WT	1930		Built reservoir construction; purchased in 1947. Sold to the Piel and Walney Gravel company in 1953.

== See also ==
- British industrial narrow gauge railways
