= Finedonhill Tramway =

Former industrial narrow-gauge railway in England

Coordinates: 52°18′55″N 0°39′50″W

Overview
- Headquarters: Wellingborough
- Locale: England
- Dates of operation: 1875–1926
- Successor: Abandoned

Technical
- Track gauge: 2 ft 6 in (762 mm)
- Length: 1 mile

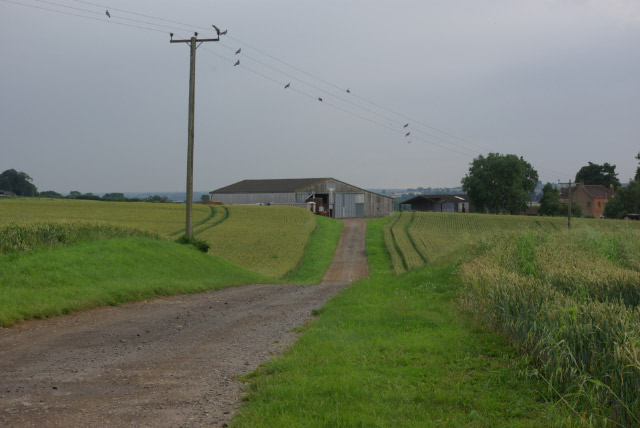
Finedonhill Farm in 2007. The tramway passed just this side of the farm buildings

The Finedonhill Tramway was a British industrial narrow-gauge railway which operated under various ownership between 1875 and 1926.

== History ==
In 1869, the Stanton Ironworks took a lease on ironstone-rich land to the east of Wellingborough, near Finedonhill Farm. They began quarrying, initially carting the ore by road to sidings on the Midland Railway near the Wellingborough Loco Shed. In 1875, a 2 ft 6 in (762 mm) gauge horse-hauled tramway was laid to connect the quarries with the sidings. The first pits were exhausted by 1884, and the tramway was extended north across Sidegate Lane to access new quarries. A stationary steam engine was installed at the south end of the tramway, which powered a continuous rope that hauled the wagons along the tramway.

A mine adit was driven under Finedonhill Farm in 1909 to access further ore deposits. This was served by a short branch off the tramway. In 1912 new leases for quarrying were taken by John Clark near South Hill Farm, about half a mile from Finedonhill Farm. He laid a short tramway to connect with the Finedonhill Tramway and ran ore trains under a wayleave from Stanton. Clark purchased a secondhand steam locomotive and ran trains over the lower section of the rope-hauled tramway.

The leases that Stanton held ended in 1918 and the Finedonhill and Sidegate Lane quarries were abandoned. In 1920, Clark took a new lease of the Sidegate Lane quarry and used the full length of the tramway. He continued to work the Sidegate Lane quarry until 1926, when he abandoned all ore quarrying. The Finedonhill Tramway was not lifted until the wartime scrap drive of 1940.

== Locomotives ==
Builder	Works number	Type	Date built	Disposal	Notes
W.G. Bagnall	1554	0-4-0ST	1898	Unknown	Purchased secondhand around 1912. Identity of locomotive is not certain.
