= Retew =

Coordinates: 50°22′36″N 4°55′13″W

- Abandoned village
- Location within Cornwall
- Civil parish: St Stephen-in-Brannel
- Unitary authority: Cornwall
- Ceremonial county: Cornwall
- Region: South West
- Country: England
- Sovereign state: United Kingdom

Retew was a village near St Austell in Cornwall, England, that was mostly demolished in the early 1960s when the nearby Wheal Remfrey china clay quarry and waste heaps were expanded.

The village was small, containing 24 houses and a factory, and stood on land owned by the quarry owners, English China Clays. The fate of the village had been expected and the residents were rehoused by the company. There was a chapel, but the village was served by visiting mobile retailers, including a butcher, a baker and a fish and chip van. The only part of the village remaining is Retew Hill on the St Dennis side, and a short stub of a road on the Fraddon side, where there is still a sign pointing to the village

== See also ==
- St Austell and Clay Country Eco-town
