= Gothers =

Coordinates: 50.393°N 4.867°W

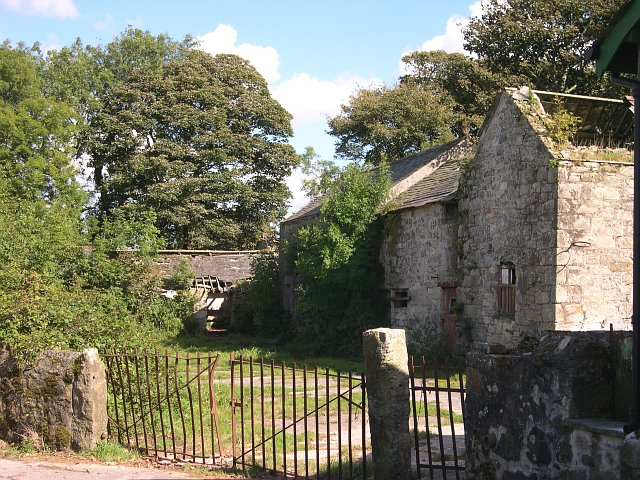
- Disused farm buildings at Gothers

- Location within Cornwall
- OS grid reference: SW963587
- Unitary authority: Cornwall
- Ceremonial county: Cornwall
- Region: South West
- Country: England
- Sovereign state: United Kingdom
- Post town: St Austell
- Postcode district: PL26

Gothers is a hamlet near and northeast of St Dennis (where the 2011 census population was included ) in mid Cornwall, England.

The manor of Gothers was recorded in the Domesday Book (1086) when it was held by Sheerwold from Robert, Count of Mortain. He had also held it before 1066. There were 2 acres of land and land for 1 plough. There were 1 villein, 1 serf, a quarter of a square league of pasture, 2 cattle and 9 sheep. The value of the manor was 3 shillings though it had formerly been worth 10 shillings.
