= W. H. Collier =

American football coach

Playing career
- 1920–1924: Apprentice

Coaching career (HC unless noted)
- 1938–1939: Apprentice

Head coaching record
- Overall: 6–11–1

William Henry "Yank" Collier was an American football coach. He was the tenth head football coach at The Apprentice Schoolin Newport News, Virginia and he held that position for two seasons, from 1938 until 1939. His coaching record at Apprentice was 6–11–1.
