= Industrial railway =

Type of railway

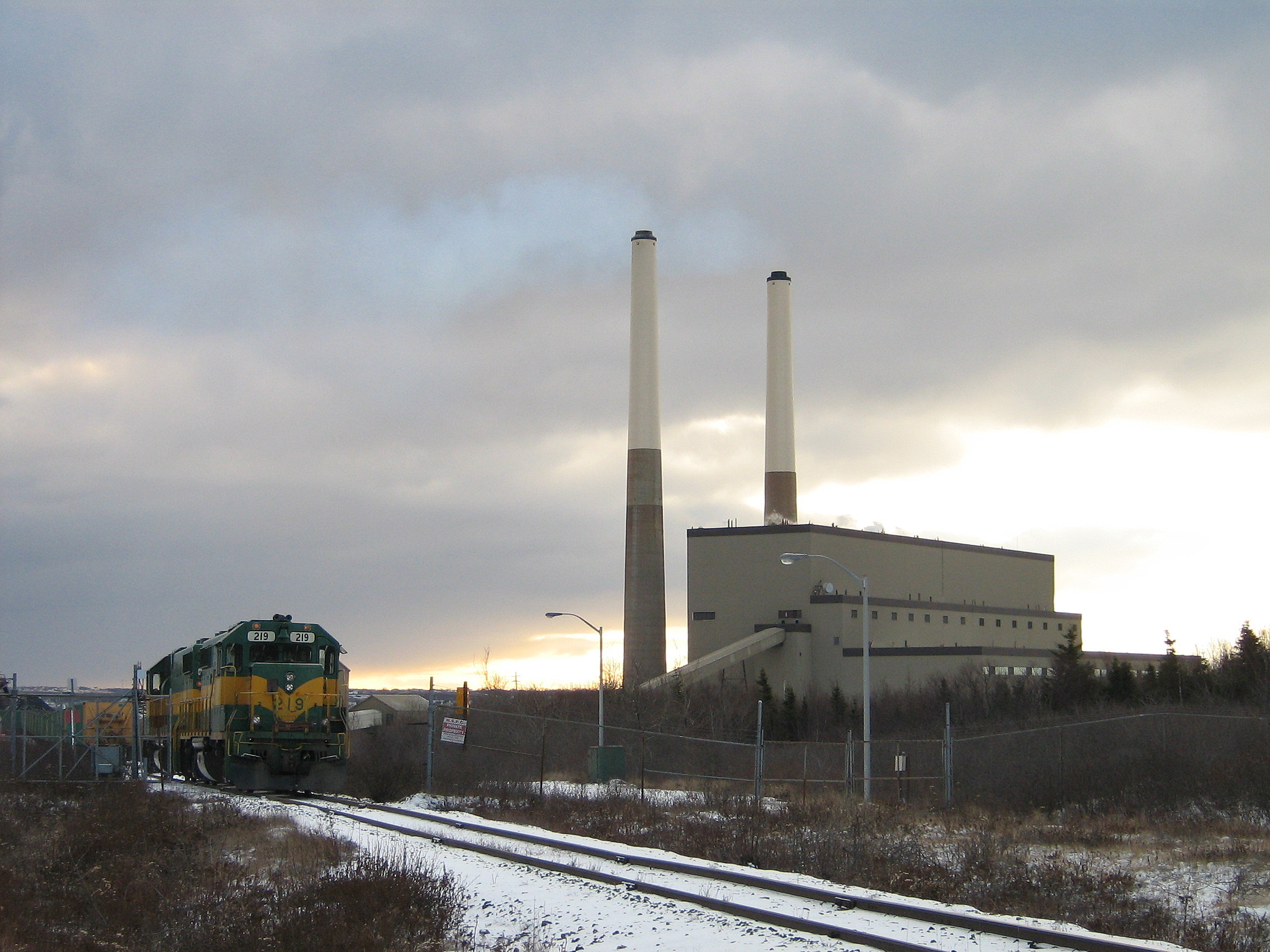
Two Sydney Coal Railway GP38-2 locomotives leave the Lingan Generating Station after unloading coal in Nova Scotia.

An industrial railway is a type of railway (usually private) that is not available for public transportation and is used exclusively to serve a particular industrial, logistics, or military site. In regions of the world influenced by British railway culture and management practices, they are often referred to as tramways (which are distinct from trams or streetcars, which are passenger technologies). Industrial railways may connect the site to public freight networks through sidings, or may be isolated (sometimes very far away from public rail or surface roads) or located entirely within a served property.

== Overview ==
Industrial railways were once very common, but with the rise of road transport, their numbers have greatly diminished.

An example of an industrial railway would transport bulk goods, for example clay from a quarry or coal from a mine, to an interchange point, called an exchange siding, with a main line railway, onwards from where it would be transported to its final destination.

The main reasons for industrial railways are normally for one of two reasons:

- Onsite shunting and consolidation: part-finished products or goods require movement between different parts of the process site to enable them to be manufactured, or made-ready for shipment. Moving relatively small amounts of goods over short distances is expensive if undertaken by mainline railway operators, who make money by charging for the shipment of goods over long distances in bulk
- Control of manufacture: Many industrial lines only operate for short periods of time, requiring the shipment of time-sensitive goods to the factory or processing point, over relatively short distances. These are mainly food products, often operating on narrow-gauge lines to enable closer access to the originating point

As a result, most industrial railways are short, usually only a few miles/kilometers long. While these types of lines most often at some point connect via exchange sidings or transfer sidings to bulk mainline shipping railways, there are notable exceptions that are hundreds of miles long, which include the iron ore-carrying railways in Western Australia, or in China to transport coal. At the same time, in Canada there are the Quebec North Shore and Labrador Railway and the Cartier Railway. These lines can be thought of as dedicated shipment routes, where only products from that industry require shipment between those two points; hence, a dedicated line makes more economic sense, with only a limited possibility of consolidating shipments with other industries. See Compagnie de gestion de Matane

Industrial railways serve many different industries. In both Australia and Cuba, a large number of industrial railways serve the sugarcane industry. In Colorado, the Coors Brewing Company uses its own industrial railway at the brewery both for the delivery of raw materials and for shipping the finished product.

== Military railways ==
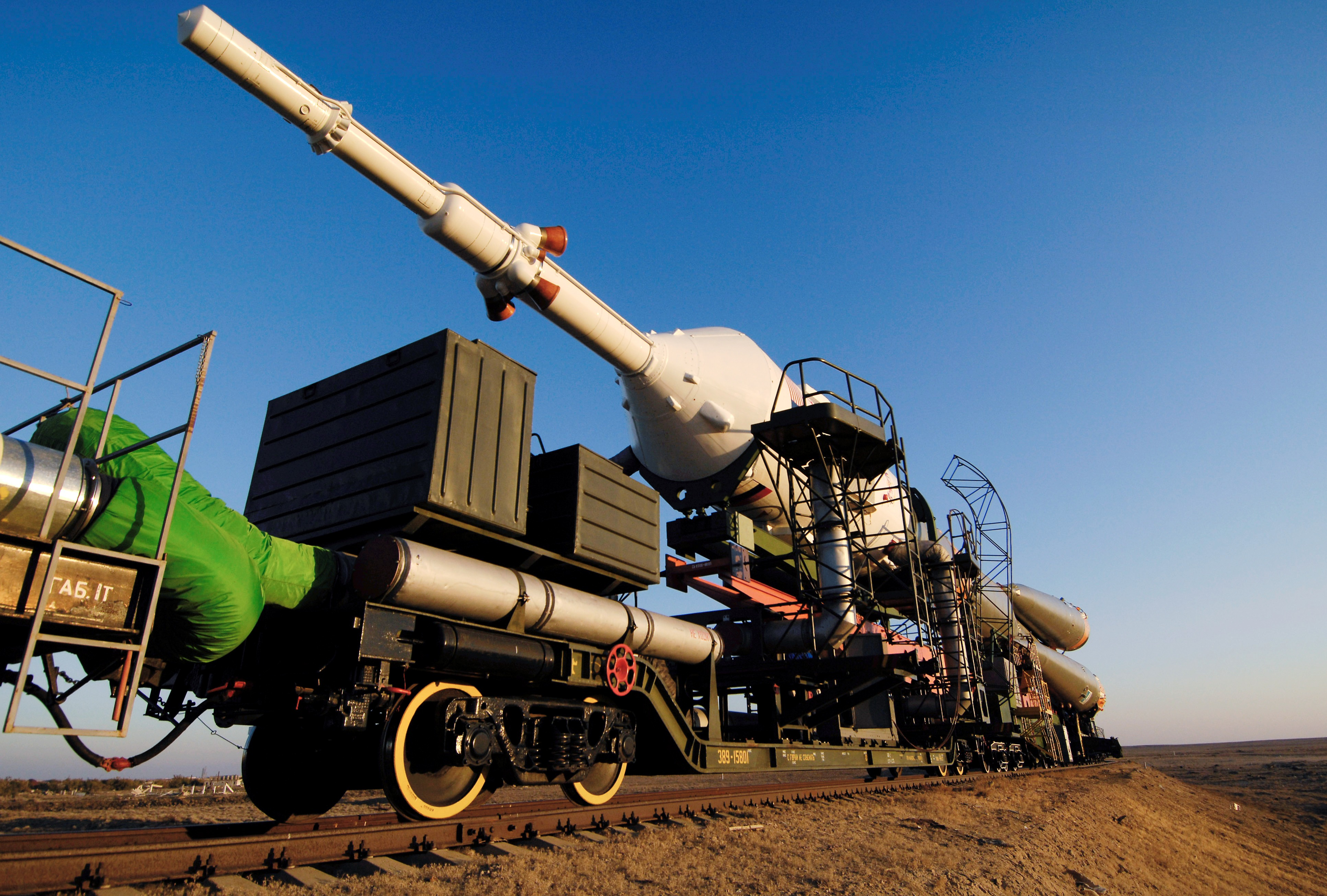
Russian spacecraft transported to the launch pad by the Baikonur intra-spaceport railway.

Some industrial railways are military in purpose and serve ammunition dumps, transportation hubs, and storage facilities. The world's largest industrial railway serves the Baikonur Cosmodrome, and has long been operated by a military rail unit of the Russian Armed Forces. The railway plays a key role in space launch events, transporting space vehicles to their immediate launch pads.

== Gallery ==
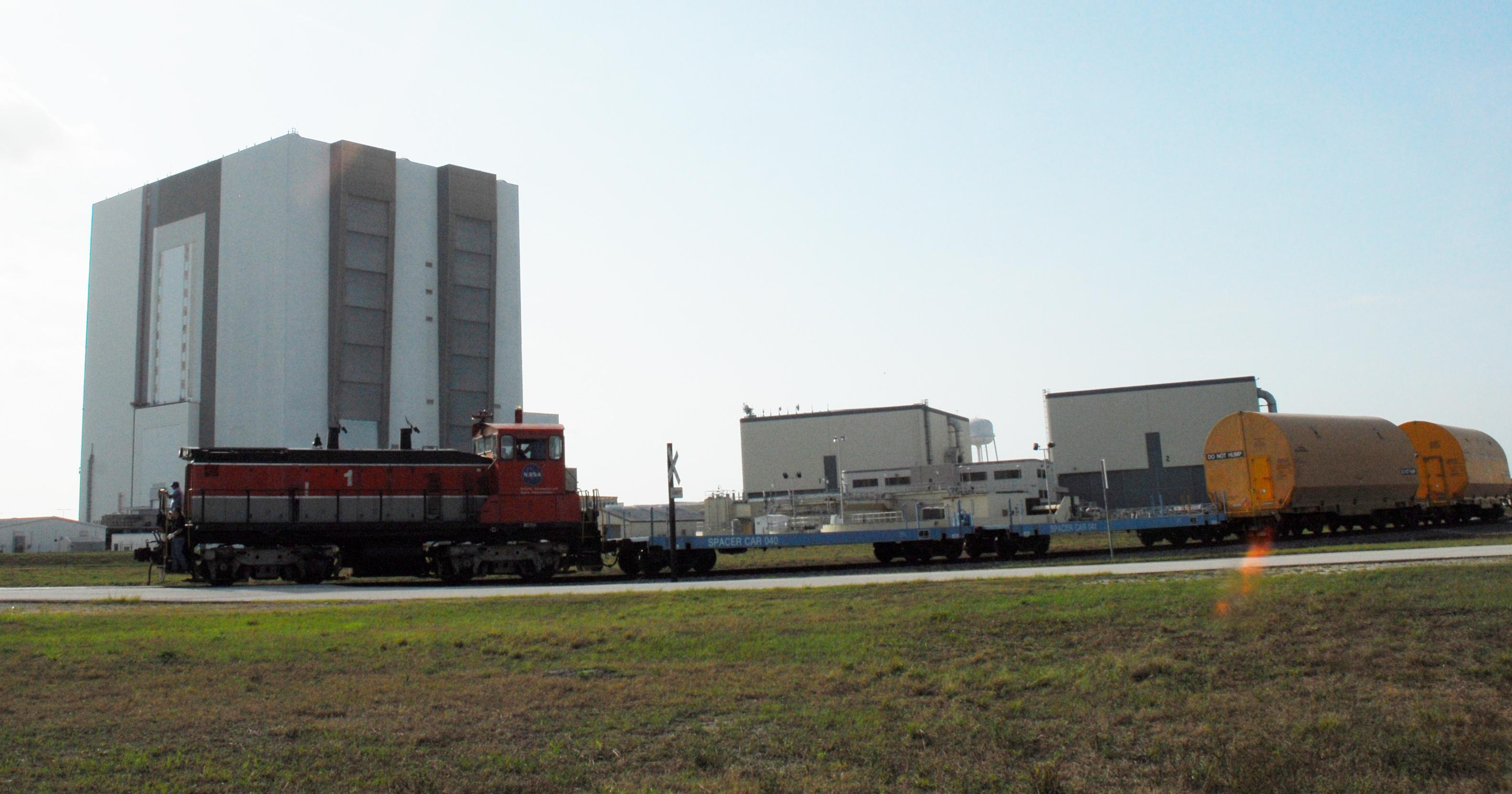
An SW1500 hauls NASA equipment cars along the NASA Railroad in Cape Canaveral, Florida.

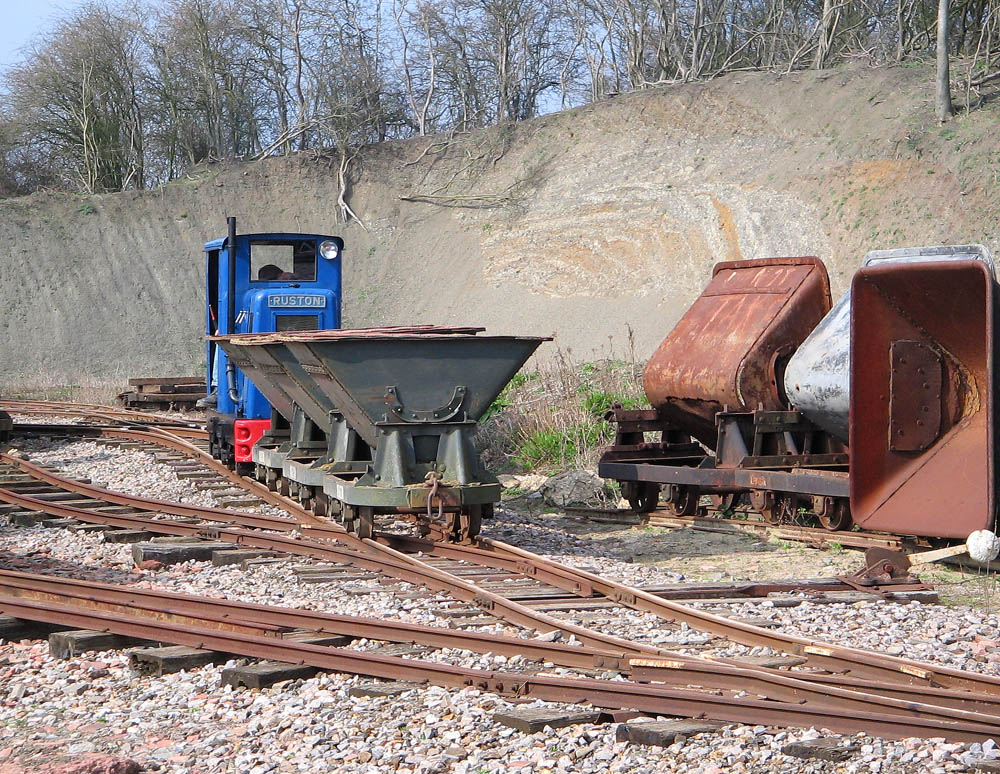
A display of a narrow-gauge industrial sand train at Leighton Buzzard Narrow Gauge Railway

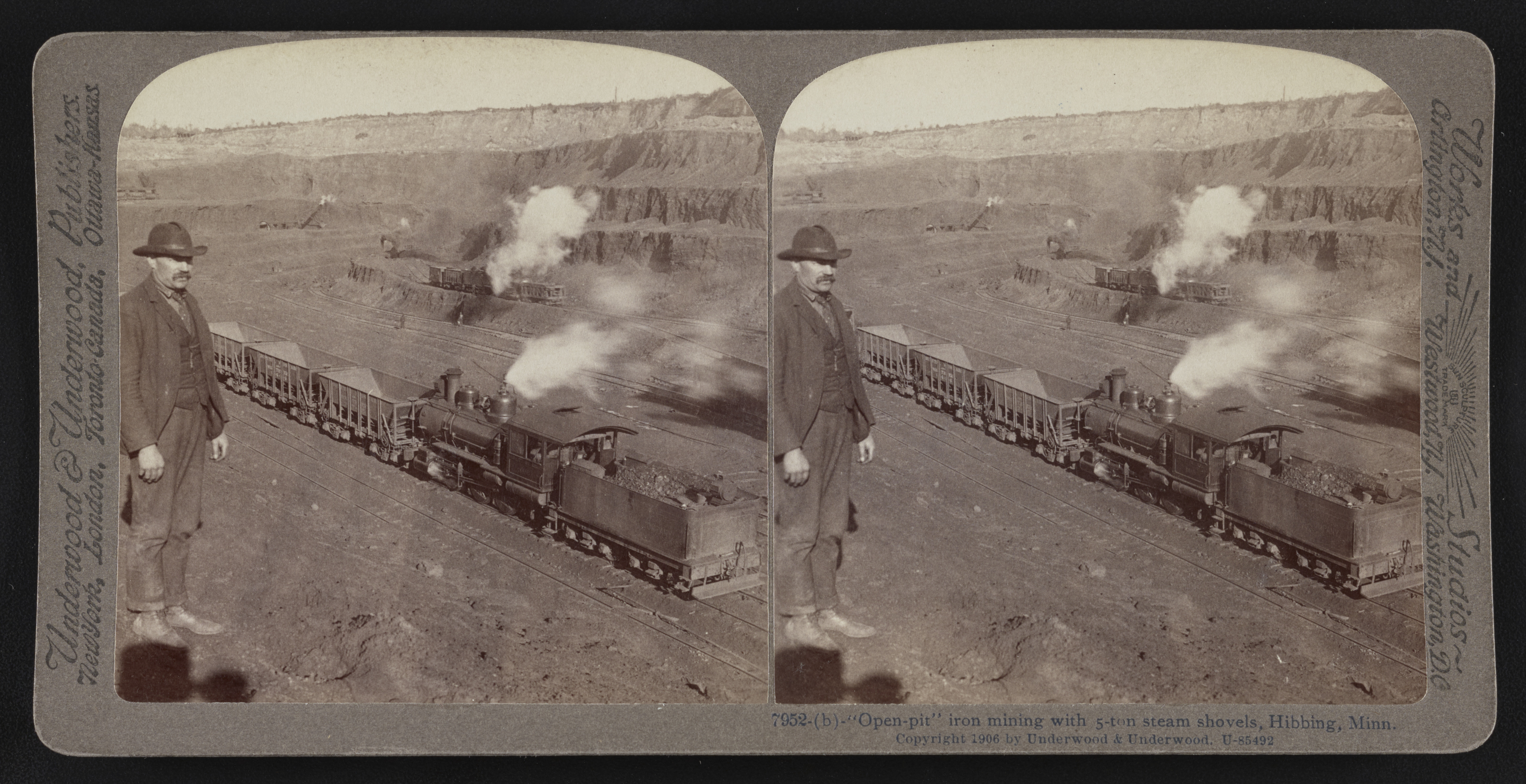
An open-cast iron mining industrial railway in Hibbing, Minnesota, circa 1906

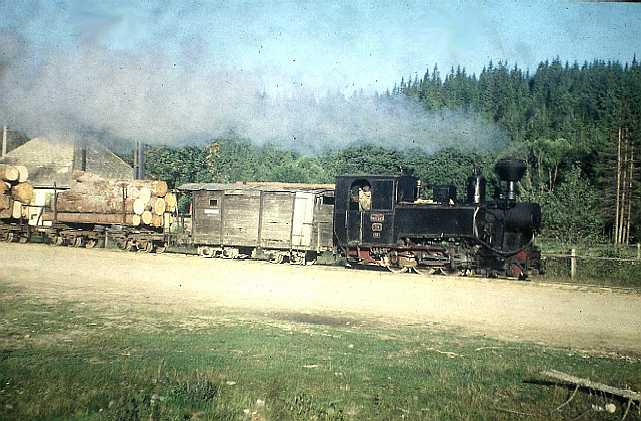
Steam-powered logging train in Comandău, Romania

== See also ==
- British industrial narrow-gauge railways
- British narrow-gauge railways
- British quarrying and mining narrow-gauge railways
- Decauville
- Forest railway
- Light railway
- Mine railway
- Minimum-gauge railway
- Other railways for the transport of goods
- Queensland sugar tramways
- S. D. Warren Paper Mill
- Short-line railroad
- Taiwan Sugar Railways
