= Hampstead station =

Hampstead station may refer to:

== Railway and Tube stations ==
- Hampstead tube station
- West Hampstead tube station
- West Hampstead railway station
- Hampstead Heath railway station
- West Hampstead Thameslink railway station

== Former stations ==
- Hampstead railway station (Metropolitan & St John's Wood Railway)

== See also ==
- Hamstead railway station
