= Stations in West Hampstead =

Transport stations in West Hampstead, London

Coordinates: 51°32′51″N 0°11′29″W

The area of West Hampstead in north-west London is served by a number of different stations, all of which have very similar names. Although physically separate, they are near each other and the stations form a railway interchange. Two of the stations are part of the National Rail network and the third is on the London Underground.

The three stations, located north to south on West End Lane, are:

- West Hampstead Thameslink railway station – served by Thameslink.
- West Hampstead railway station – served by London Overground.
- West Hampstead tube station – served by London Underground Jubilee line.

== Stations and lines ==
West Hampstead Thameslink railway station is the oldest of the three stations, but acquired its name when the Thameslink route was established in 1988. Earlier names included West End, West End and Brondesbury, West Hampstead and until 1988, West Hampstead Midland. It is located on the western side of West End Lane at the Iverson Road junction. Services are operated by Thameslink. As of 2018, annual usage was 3.8 million.

West Hampstead railway station is on the North London Line, with train services provided by London Overground. It was known as West End Lane until 1975. It is on the western side of West End Lane between the tube station and Iverson Road. As of 2018, annual usage was 4.5 million.

West Hampstead tube station is on London Underground Jubilee line. It is on the eastern side of West End Lane near Broadhurst Gardens. It was a Bakerloo line station until 1979. As of 2018, annual usage was 10.5 million.

Additionally, three railway lines pass through West Hampstead but do not have stations in the area; they are:

- The Metropolitan line, whose trains bypass the tube station as they have no platforms there;
- The Midland Main Line, whose trains run through the Thameslink station without stopping;
- The Chiltern Main Line, which runs parallel to the Underground lines on the south side.
West Hampstead stations

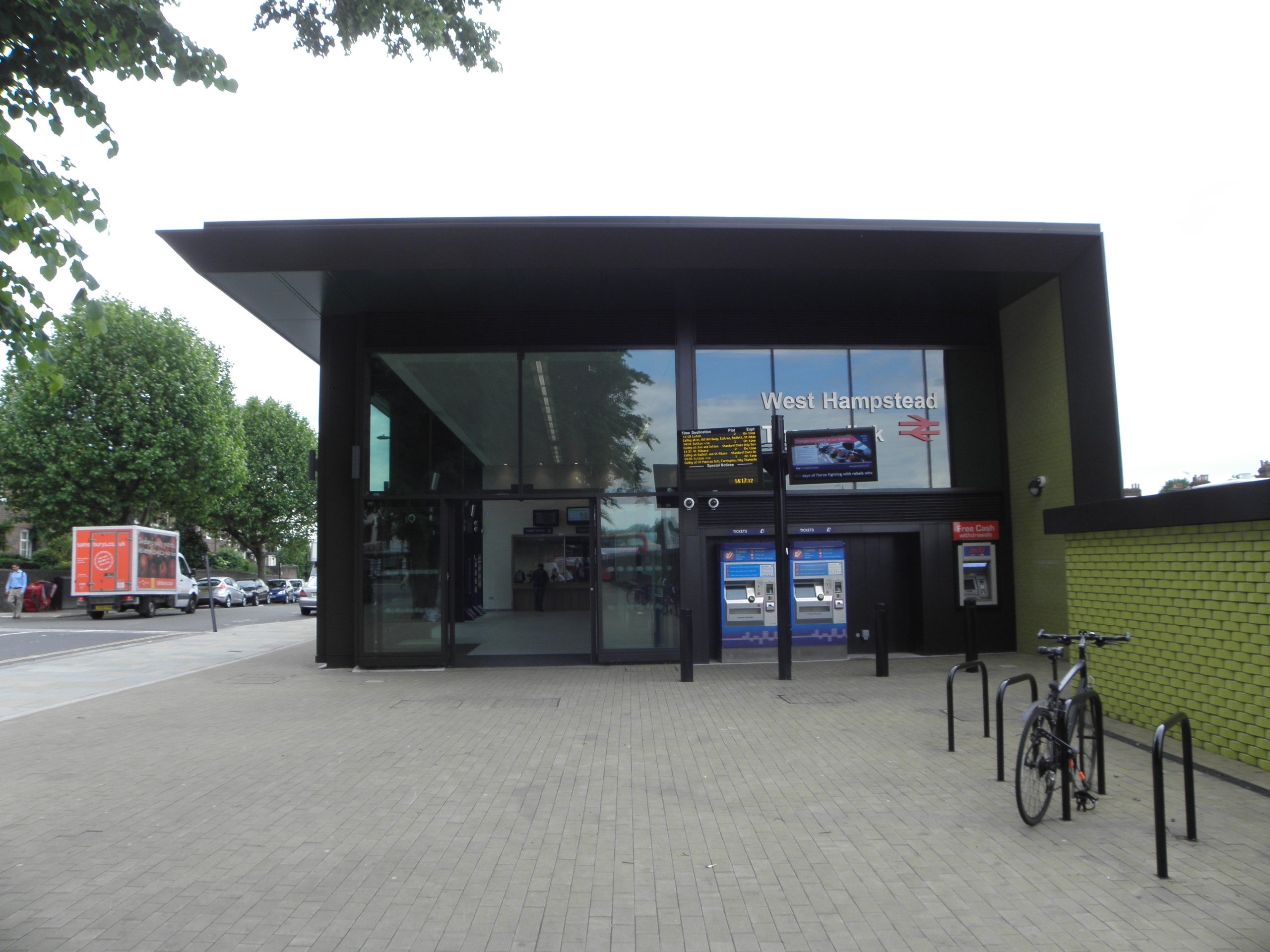
West Hampstead Thameslink station

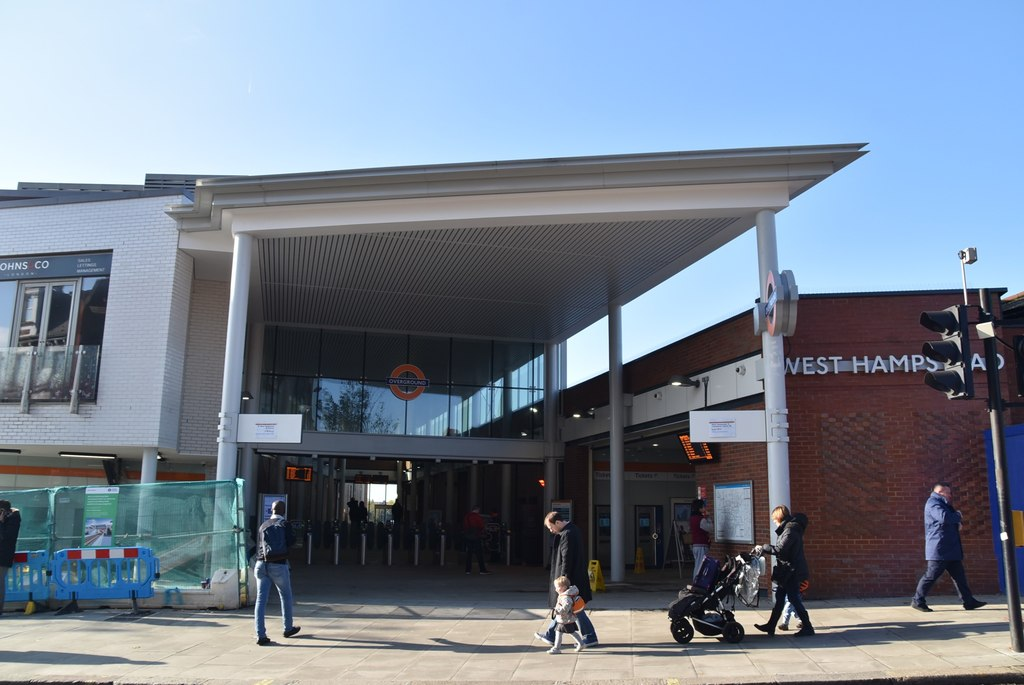
West Hampstead Overground station

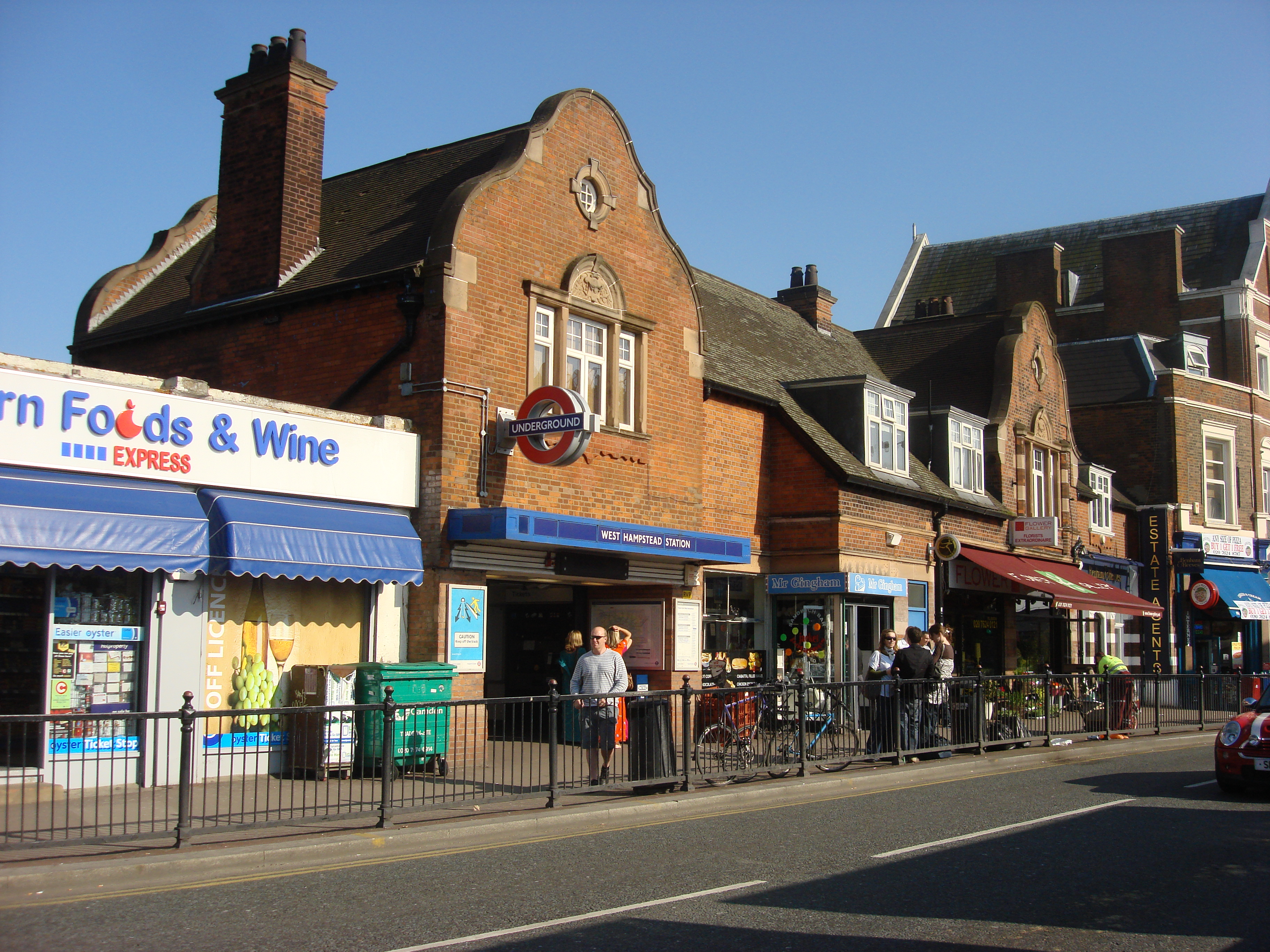
West Hampstead tube station

== Current interchange ==
Lines and stations

To change stations passengers leave one and walk along West End Lane to the other. The diagram shows the relative locations of the stations which are spaced over about 200 metres (220 yards). Out-of-station interchange within twenty minutes between any two of the stations entails no additional charge. As an example: a journey from Richmond to St Albans may be made on one ticket with a walk between the North London Line and the Thameslink stations. Step free access is available at the Thameslink and Overground stations.

== West Hampstead Interchange proposal ==
In 2003, Chiltern Railways unveiled a proposal to redevelop the area along West End Lane to create an integrated station complex which would allow passenger interchange among five different tube and railway lines. The scheme envisaged building new platforms on the Chiltern Main Line and the Metropolitan lines, and relocating the Thameslink and London Overground stations to the east side of West End Lane. The combined station would have a central passenger concourse and ticket hall, and pedestrian walkways would connect the stations. The scheme also proposed the construction of a new housing and office development and widening West End Lane, turning it into "a tree-lined boulevard" with additional space for buses and taxis.

The plans were put on hold in 2007 due to uncertainty over the North London Line rail franchise. The proposal is now no longer possible, due to development in the area. Furthermore, both the Thameslink station and the Overground station have been rebuilt and upgraded in recent years, with step free access added to both.

== Current services ==
West Hampstead Underground station
Preceding station	London Underground	Following station
Kilburn towards Stanmore	Jubilee line	Finchley Road towards Stratford
West Hampstead Thameslink railway station
Preceding station	National Rail	Following station
St Pancras International	Thameslink Thameslink	St Albans City
Kentish Town	Thameslink Sutton Loop	Cricklewood
Kentish Town	Thameslink Bedford-Sevenoaks	Cricklewood
West Hampstead railway station
Preceding station	London Overground	Following station
Brondesbury towards Clapham Junction or Richmond	Mildmay line North London line and West London line	Finchley Road & Frognal towards Stratford
