= West Hampstead =

Area in the London Borough of Camden

Coordinates: 51.5543°N 0.1888°W

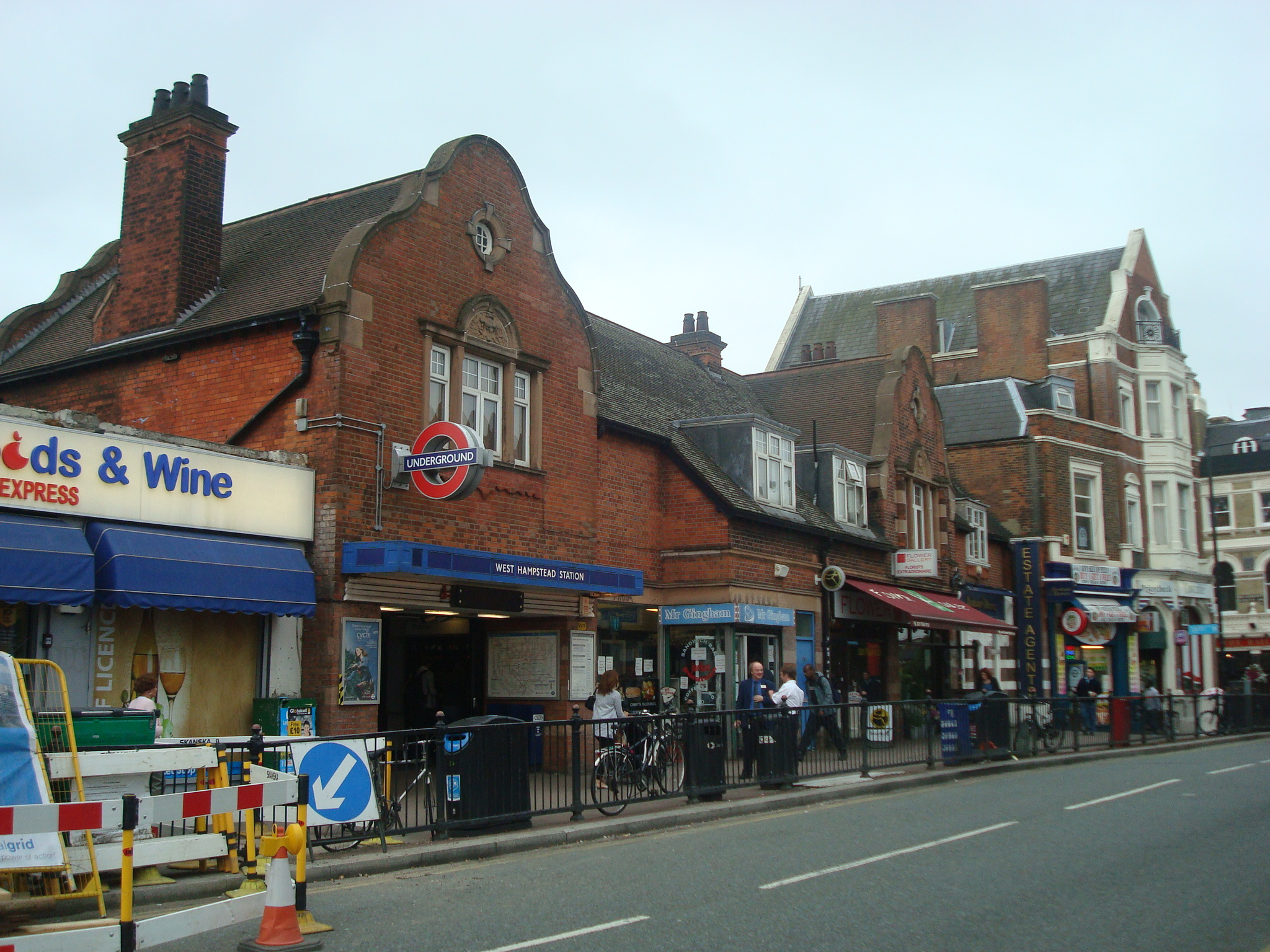

- Location within Greater London
- Population: 11,658
- OS grid reference: TQ255855
- London borough: Camden
- Ceremonial county: Greater London
- Region: London
- Country: England
- Sovereign state: United Kingdom
- Post town: LONDON
- Postcode district: NW3, NW6
- Dialling code: 020
- Police: Metropolitan
- Fire: London
- Ambulance: London
- UK Parliament: Hampstead and Highgate
- London Assembly: Barnet and Camden

West Hampstead is an area in the London Borough of Camden. Neighbouring areas includes Childs Hill to the north, Frognal to the east, Swiss Cottage to the south-east, South Hampstead to the south and Kilburn to the south-west.

The neighbourhood is mainly residential, with several local amenities, including a range of independent shops, supermarkets, restaurants, bars, cafes and bakeries; most of these are concentrated in the northern section of West End Lane (its high street), and around West End Green. Located in travel zone 2, West Hampstead is served by three stations: West Hampstead on the Jubilee line, West Hampstead Overground station and West Hampstead Thameslink station.

== History ==
A map showing the West End ward of Hampstead Metropolitan Borough as it appeared in 1916

=== West End hamlet ===
An area, known as "le Rudyng" (indicating a woodland clearing) in the mid-13th century, had by 1534 come to be called West End. It was then a freehold estate belonging to Kilburn Priory, and was so called because it was at the west end of another, larger estate. Although it is possible that there was a dwelling on the estate prior to 1244, an estate house was certainly extant by 1646. West End Lane (named as such by 1644), the main road through the area, is still bent at a right-angle at the north and south ends where it connects to Finchley Road and Edgware Road respectively. This is because the lane used to form the boundary between a number of different estates.

By the early 17th century several houses were present, and by the middle of that century London merchants were building larger houses in the area. By 1800 West End was a hamlet of two to three dozen houses and cottages located in parkland, mostly on the west side of West End Lane and Fortune Green Lane, and north of the present-day railway lines. West End Lane had been rerouted, making it straighter and lying further to the west than previously. In 1851 residents were mainly agricultural labourers, gardeners, craftsmen and tradespeople, with an innkeeper, two beershop keepers, a schoolmistress and a few gentry. There were three main large houses: West End House, West End Hall and Lauriston Lodge.

=== West Hampstead ===
Transformation of the area started with the construction of three railway lines across West End Lane: Hampstead Junction Railway, built by 1857; Midland line, opened in 1868; and Metropolitan & St. John's Wood line, opened in 1879. West Hampstead was the name adopted by Metropolitan & St. John's Wood for its station on West End Lane. The period of greatest development in the area was the 15 years from the opening of that station, with estates on the west side of West End Lane being turned from farmland and parkland into housing estates. In 1897 large-scale development started on the east side of West End Lane, where three large houses, West End Hall, Canterbury House and Treherne House, had stood until then.

== Notable buildings and sites ==
- Emmanuel Church, an Anglican church on the corner of Lyncroft Gardens, opened in 1903.
- Hampstead Cemetery on Fortune Green Road, opened in 1876
- Hampstead Cricket Club moved to Lymington Road in 1877.
- Hampstead Synagogue on Dennington Park Road, built on the site of Lauriston Lodge, opened in 1892.
- Lilian Baylis House at 165 Broadhurst Gardens, opened in the 1880s. It was originally the Falcon Works, a place for tradespeople to work from. A few years later it was turned into a venue for concerts, meetings and other gatherings and named West Hampstead Town Hall. In 1928, Crystalate Gramophone Record Manufacturing took it over and moved its recording studio there. In 1937, Decca took it over and the building became Decca Studios until 1980. Artists including David Bowie and the Rolling Stones recorded there, but the Beatles failed their audition there on 1 January 1962, before they signed with Parlophone. It is now used as rehearsal space by the English National Opera.
- The Railway Hotel on the corner of West End Lane and Broadhurst Gardens, built in 1881. From 1961 to 1970 it housed Klooks Kleek, a jazz and rhythm & blues club. Notable acts performing there included Cream, Ten Years After, Stevie Wonder, Buddy Guy and Rod Stewart. The live album John Mayall Plays John Mayall was recorded there in 1964 by running cables out of the window to Decca Studios, which was two buildings away. The British blues/rock band Ten Years After did likewise on 14 May 1968, and released the performance as their second album Undead.
- St. James Church on Sherriff Road, the first church in the UK to house a main-branch post office and community centre, the Sheriff Centre.
- West Hampstead Fire Station was opened in 1901 and is still operating, responding to over 2,000 emergency calls a year. Its service area covers 12 square miles (31 km^{2}), including Hampstead, West Hampstead, Kilburn, Cricklewood and parts of Golders Green.

== Transport links ==
There are three railway stations named West Hampstead, all within close proximity, and a number of other tube stations in the area. Numerous bus routes pass through the district.

- Tube: West Hampstead tube station, on the Jubilee line. Nearby is Finchley Road tube station, on the Jubilee and Metropolitan lines.
- Trains: West Hampstead Thameslink station on the cross London Thameslink route, and West Hampstead Overground station on the Mildmay line.
- Buses: 13, 113, 139, 189, 328, C11 and N113.

== Notable residents ==
There are four English Heritage blue plaques in West Hampstead commemorating historic personalities that have lived there. The plaques mark the residences of painter David Bomberg at 10 Fordwych Road, conductor Sir Adrian Boult at 78 Marlborough Mansions on Cannon Hill, newspaper proprietor Alfred Harmsworth, 1st Viscount Northcliffe at 31 Pandora Road, and ophthalmologist Dame Ida Mann at 13 Minster Road.

=== Other notable people ===
- Gerry Anderson – publisher, producer, director and writer
- Joan Armatrading – singer and musician, resident in her early days
- Camila Batmanghelidjh – businesswoman, charity leader and author
- Sacha Bennett – filmmaker
- Dirk Bogarde – actor
- Paul Brightwell – actor
- Sandy Brown – jazz musician, lived on Canfield Gardens
- Jim Carter – actor
- Michael Clanchy - historian
- Gus Dudgeon – record producer, lived at Kings Gardens and worked at Decca Studios
- Maurice Feild – artist
- Steven Finn – Middlesex County Cricket Club and England cricketer
- Marina Fiorato – author
- Stephen Fry – actor and television presenter
- GFOTY – artist and musician
- Angela Griffin – actress and television presenter
- Julia Hartley-Brewer – radio presenter, political journalist and newspaper columnist
- Margot Heinemann – Marxist writer, leading member of the Communist Party of Great Britain, born at 89 Priory Road
- Derek Jacobi – actor
- Chaka Khan – singer
- Jim Laker – Surrey CCC and England cricketer, lived in West Hampstead when he took a world record 19 for 90 at Old Trafford during the 1956 Ashes.
- Phyllida Law – actress
- Turner Layton – singer and composer, lived on Aberdare Gardens from the 1930s to the 1970s
- Doris Lessing – author
- Dua Lipa – singer and songwriter and YouTuber
- Matt Lucas – comedian and actor
- Bill Nighy – actor
- Slash – guitarist for Velvet Revolver and formerly for Guns N' Roses
- Henry Spinetti – drummer, session musician and brother of actor Victor Spinetti
- Dusty Springfield – singer, born and lived on Sumatra Road
- Imelda Staunton – actress
- Emma Thompson – actress, comedian and screenwriter
- Eric Thompson – actor, television presenter and producer
- Sophie Thompson – actress
- Callum Turner – actor
- Johnny Vegas – actor, comedian
- Alec and Evelyn Waugh – authors, who grew up in Hillfield Road
- Robert Webb - actor, comedian
- Greg Wise – actor

== Gallery ==
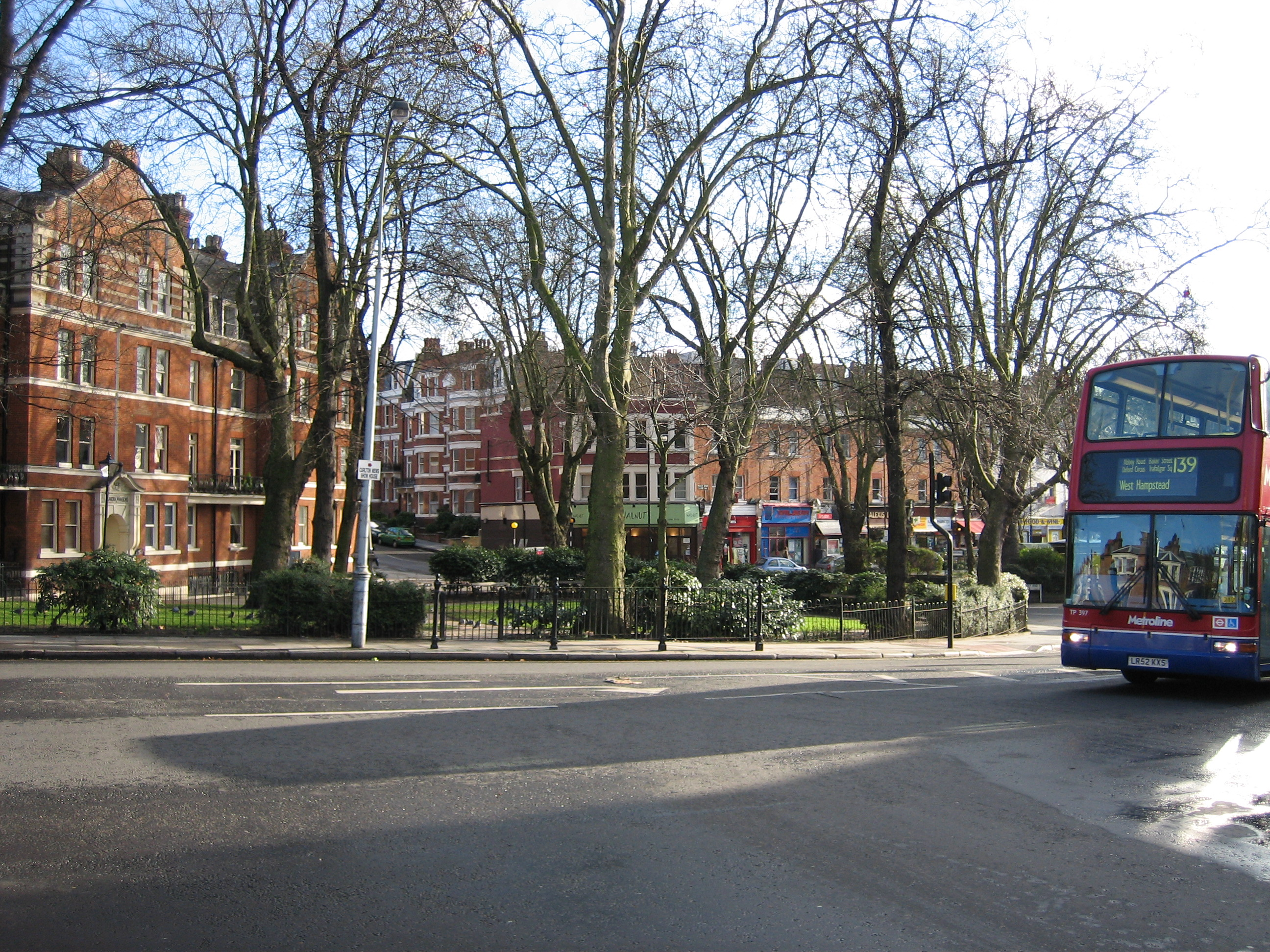
West End Green, near the northern end of West End Lane

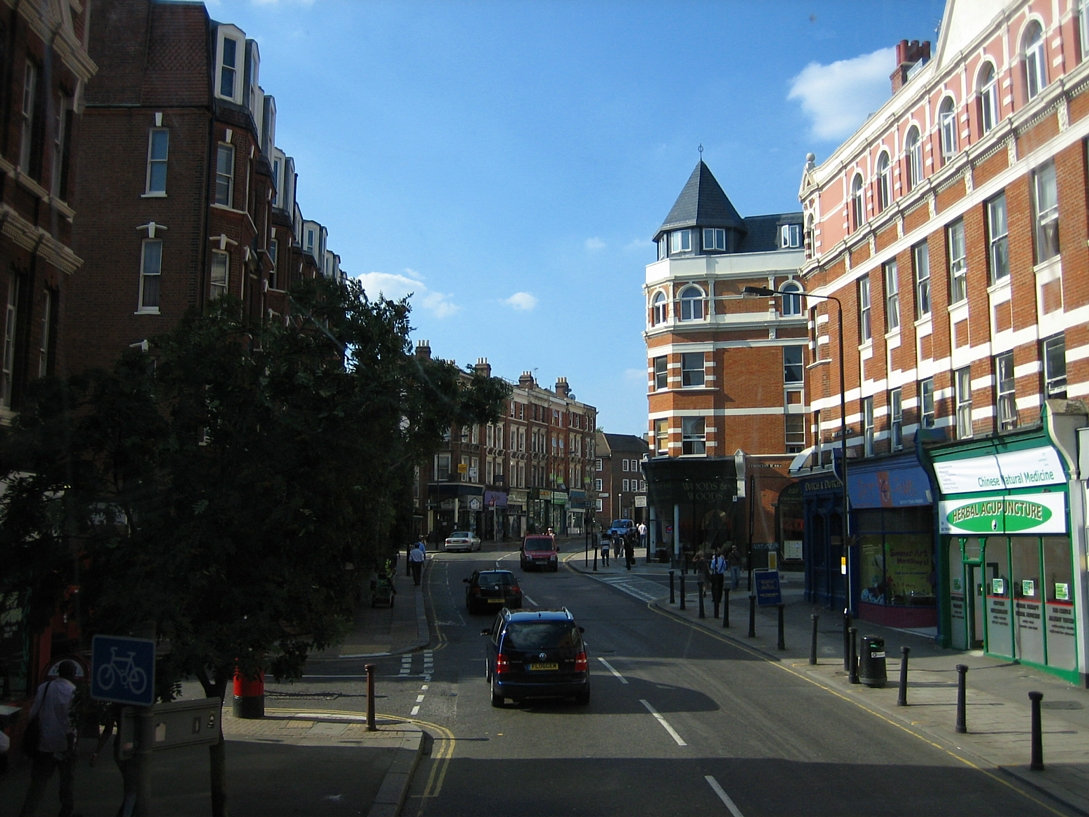
Shops on West End Lane

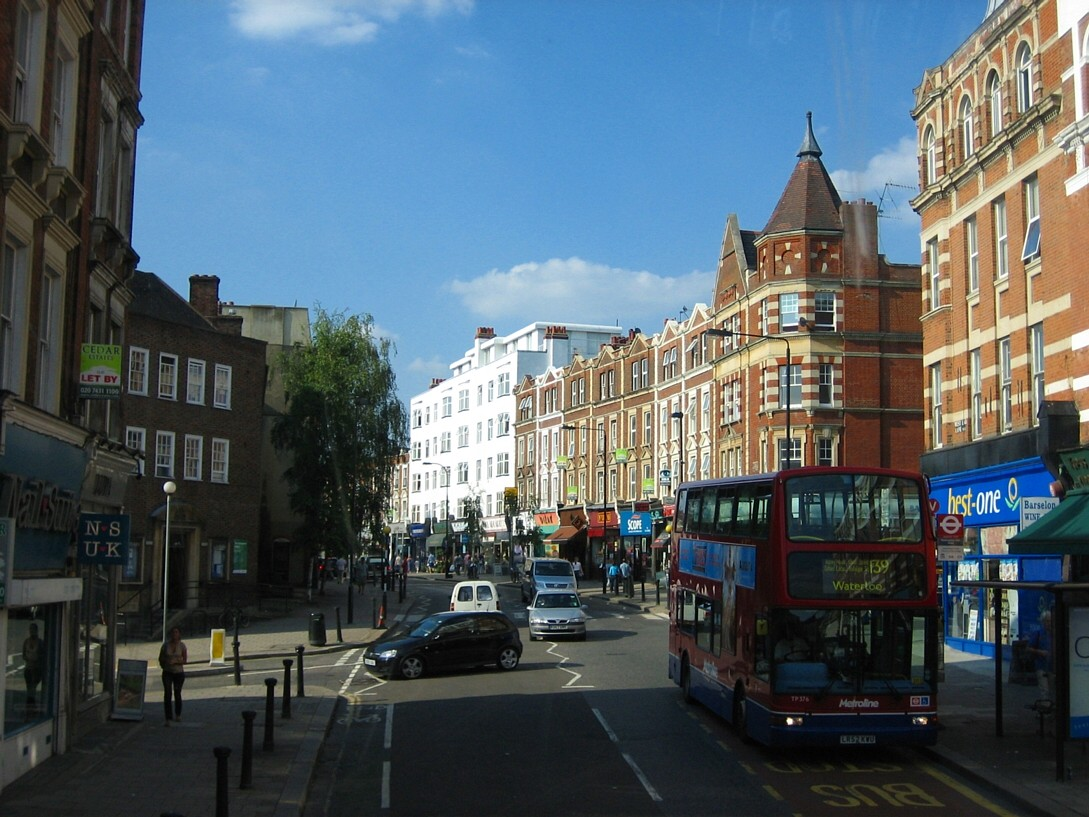
Shops, West Hampstead Library on West End Lane

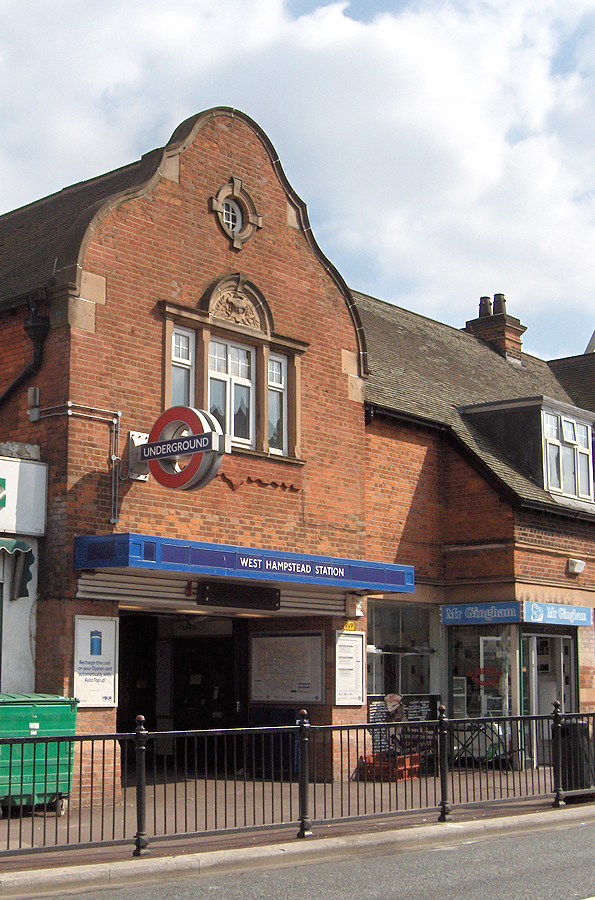
West Hampstead tube station

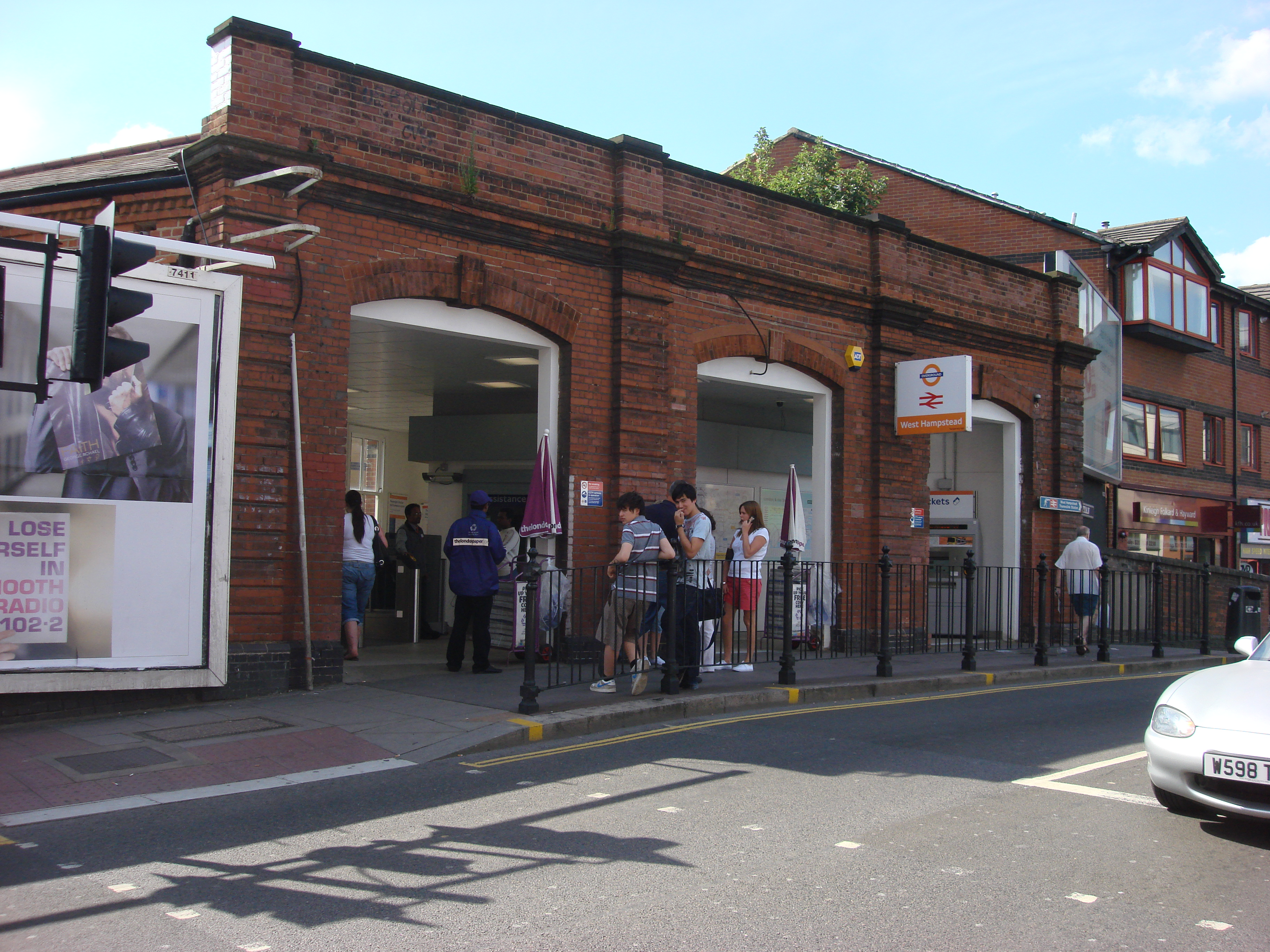
West Hampstead (old) London Overground station

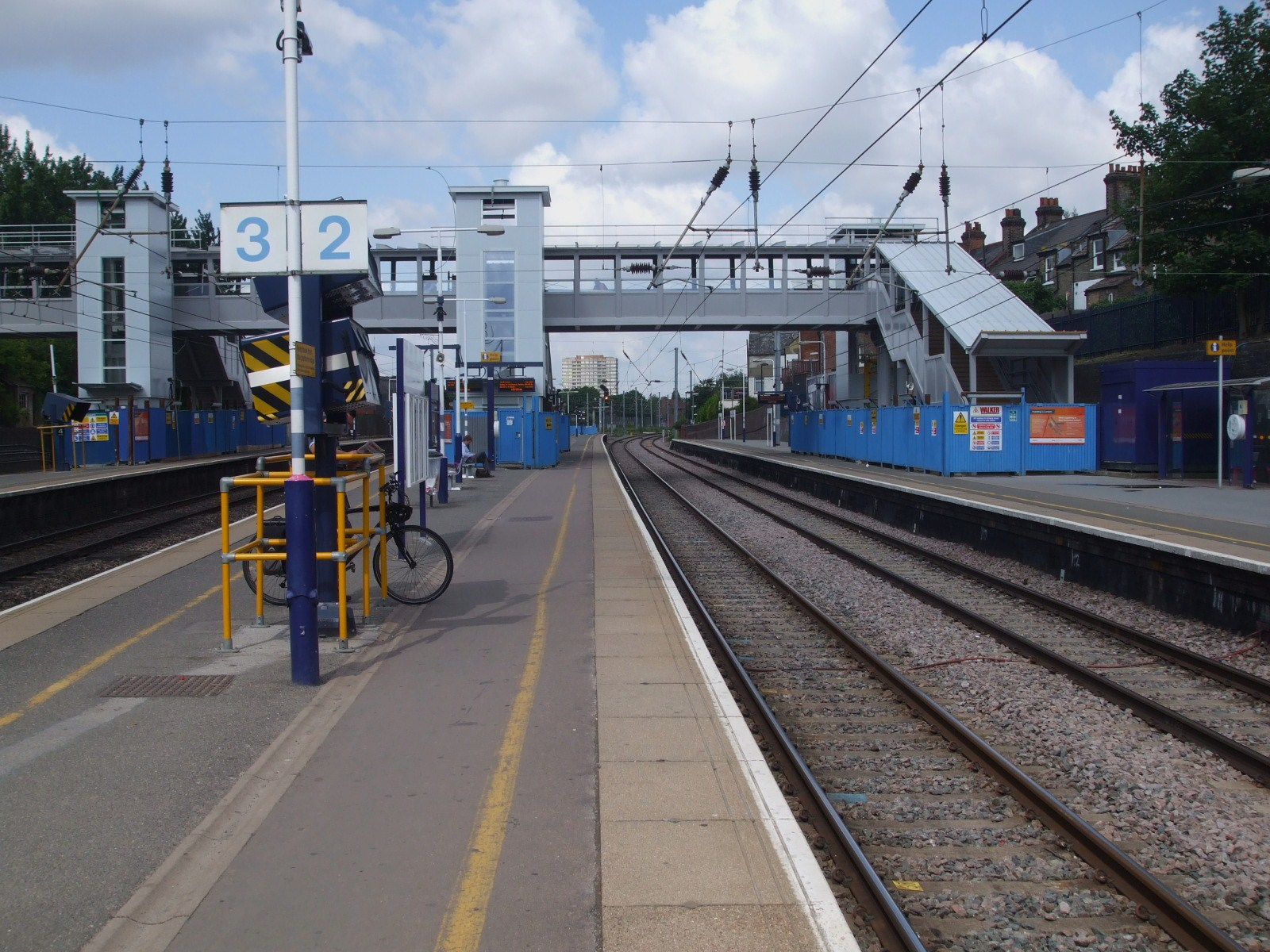
West Hampstead Thameslink station
