= Jubilee line =

London Underground line

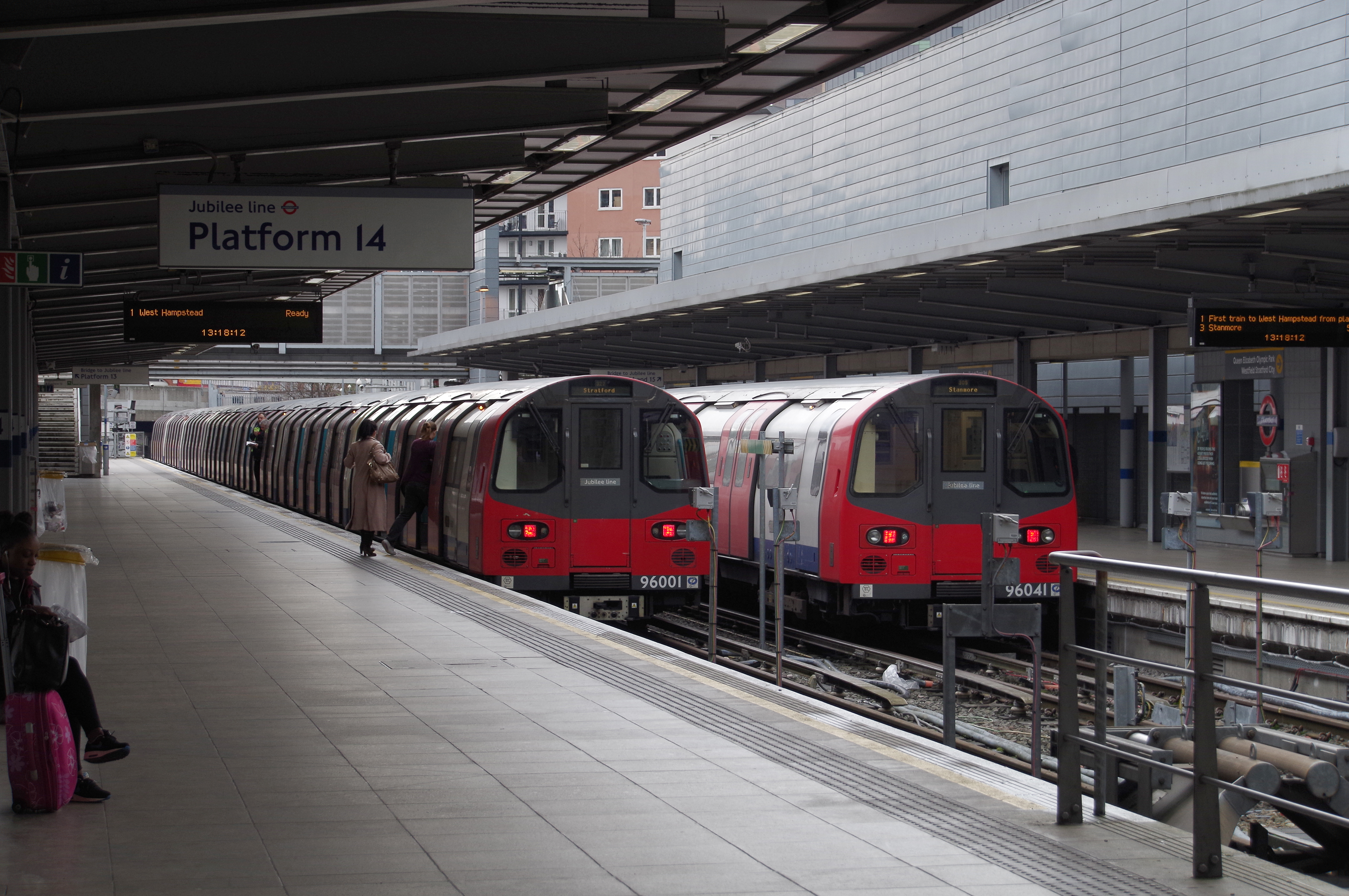
- 1996 Stock trains at Stratford in 2014

Overview
- Termini: North Greenwich, Stratford; Wembley Park, Stanmore
- Stations: 27
- Colour on map: Silver/grey
- Website: tfl.gov.uk/tube/route/jubilee/

Service
- Type: Rapid transit
- System: London Underground
- Depots: Neasden; Stratford Market
- Rolling stock: 1996 Stock
- Ridership: 276.813 million (2019) passenger journeys

History
- Opened: 1 May 1979; 47 years ago
- Last extension: 1999

Technical
- Line length: 36.2 km (22.5 mi)
- Character: Deep-level tube
- Track gauge: 1,435 mm (4 ft 8 1/2 in) standard gauge
- Electrification: Fourth rail, 630 V DC
- Operating speed: 100 km/h (62 mph)
- Signalling: CBTC (SelTrac S40)
- Train protection system: TBTC
Transport for London rail lines
London Underground
Bakerloo
Central
Circle
District
Hammersmith & City
Jubilee
Metropolitan
Northern
Piccadilly
Victoria
Waterloo & City
London Overground
Liberty
Lioness
Mildmay
Suffragette
Weaver
Windrush
Other TfL Modes
DLR
Elizabeth line
London Trams

The Jubilee line is a London Underground line that runs between Stanmore in suburban north-west London and Stratford in east London, via the West End, South Bank and Docklands. Opened in 1979, it is the newest line on the Underground network, although some sections of track date back to 1932 and some stations to 1879.

The western section of the line between Stanmore and Baker Street was previously a branch of the Metropolitan line until 1939 and later a branch of the Bakerloo line until 1979, while the newly built line was completed in two major sections: initially in 1979 to Charing Cross, then in 1999 with an extension to Stratford. The later stations are larger and have special safety features, both aspects being attempts to future-proof the line. Following the extension to east London, serving areas once poorly connected to the Underground, the line has seen a huge growth in passenger numbers and is the fourth-busiest on the network (after the Northern, Victoria and Central lines), with over 276 million passenger journeys in 2019.

Between Wembley Park and Finchley Road, the Jubilee line shares its route with the Metropolitan line and the Chiltern Main Line. Between Canning Town and Stratford it runs parallel to the Stratford International branch of the Docklands Light Railway. The Jubilee line is printed silver/grey on the Tube map, to commemorate the Silver Jubilee of Elizabeth II, after which the line was named.

== History ==
=== 1932 to 1939 ===
The first section of what is now the Jubilee line opened in 1932, when the Metropolitan Railway built a branch from its main line at Wembley Park to Stanmore. The line, as with many others in the northwest London area, was designed for the use of commuters from the new and rapidly expanding suburbs. The line presented the Metropolitan with a problem. The suburban traffic had been so successful that, by the early 1930s, the lines into Baker Street were becoming overloaded, a problem exacerbated by the post-war flight from the City of London to the West End of London.

At first, the Metropolitan had advocated a new deep tube line roughly following the line of the Edgware Road between the tube station and a point near Willesden Green. Indeed, construction advanced as far as the rebuilding of Edgware Road station to accommodate 4 platforms of 8-car length. Things changed, though, with the formation of the London Passenger Transport Board (LPTB) and the subsequent absorption of the Metropolitan line. The solution was now a new branch of the Bakerloo line from Baker Street to serve new stations at St John's Wood and Swiss Cottage, thereby rendering the existing stations of Lord's, Marlborough Road and Swiss Cottage on the parallel route redundant, and negating the need for the Met's extension from Edgware Road station. It was originally proposed that the Metropolitan line's Swiss Cottage station would remain open during peak hours for interchange with the Bakerloo, and that Lord's station would open for special cricketing events, but both were closed permanently as economy measures during the Second World War.

The new line rose between the Metropolitan line tracks at Finchley Road, providing cross-platform interchange with the Metropolitan line. Continuing north to Wembley Park, the new Bakerloo line branch was to provide local service on the Metropolitan line, where Metropolitan line trains ran non-stop between Finchley Road and Wembley Park, cutting seven minutes from journey times. At Wembley Park, the new Bakerloo would turn north to serve Kingsbury, Queensbury, Canons Park and Stanmore, taking over the former Metropolitan branch. The Bakerloo extension, built as above, opened in 1939.

=== 1939 to 1979, the Fleet line ===
The planning for the Tube network immediately before and after World War II considered several new routes. The main results of this study concerned two major routes: the south-to-northeast "line C", and lines 3 and 4, new cross-town routes, linking the northwest suburbs to Fenchurch Street, Wapping and variously Lewisham and Hayes. Line C opened as the Victoria line, in stages, from 1968 to 1972. Work on the northwest–southeast route continued.

The "Fleet line" was mentioned in a 1965 Times article, discussing options after the Victoria line had been completed – suggesting that the Fleet line could take a route via Baker Street, Bond Street, Trafalgar Square, Strand, Fleet Street, Ludgate Circus and Cannon Street, then proceeding into southeast London. The new line was to have been called the Fleet line, partly because it ran along Fleet Street, which itself is named after the River Fleet (although it would only have crossed under the Fleet at Ludgate Circus; the central London section mostly follows the Tyburn).

In 1971, construction began on the new Fleet line. Economic pressure and doubt over the final destination of the line had led to a staged approach. In the first stage, the Baker Street to Stanmore branch of the Bakerloo line was joined at Baker Street to a new 2.5-mile (4 km) segment into central London, with intermediate stops at Bond Street and Green Park and terminating at a new station at Charing Cross, thereby relieving pressure on the West End section of the Bakerloo line between Baker Street and Charing Cross and also allowing increased frequencies on the section north of Baker Street. The new tube was to offer cross-platform interchange between the Bakerloo and Fleet at Baker Street, as pioneered on the Victoria line. The work was completed in 1979. As part of the works, Trafalgar Square (Bakerloo) and Strand (Northern) stations were combined into a single station complex, Charing Cross. The existing Charing Cross tube station was renamed Embankment.

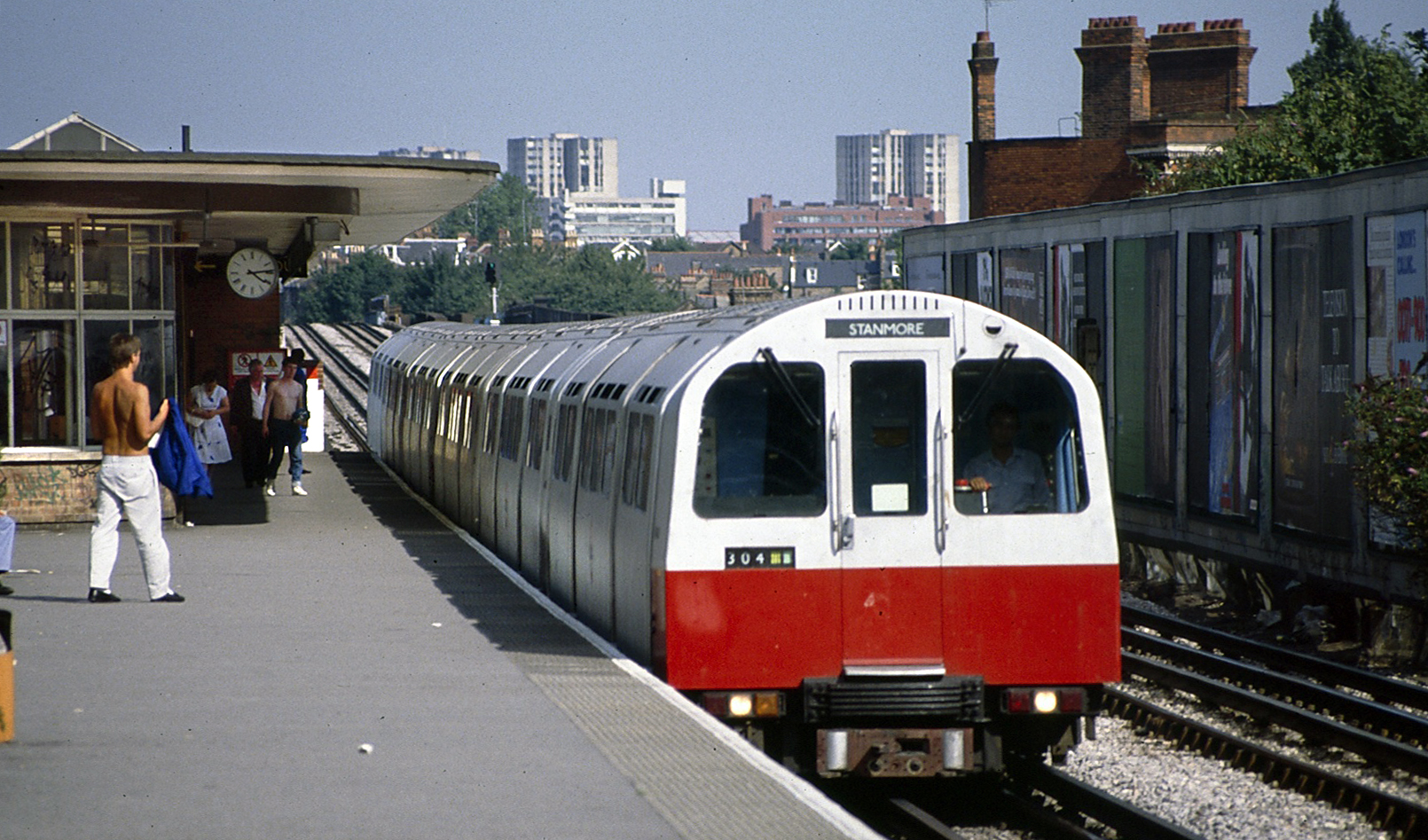
1983 Stock train to Stanmore at Kilburn in 1988

Another part of the works included a section of test tunnel, built near New Cross. This part of London has waterlogged soil that is difficult to tunnel in, so a new tunnelling method, called the bentonite shield, was used experimentally in 1972 to construct a 150 m (490 ft) section of tunnel on the line of the proposed Phase 2 route. The experiment was successful, leading to the introduction of this method of construction elsewhere, but when the planned route was altered, this 180-metre (590 ft) section was left abandoned.

In 1975, when plans were under way to introduce the London Transport Silver Jubilee Bus fleet, the then Sales Manager of London Transport Advertising, Geoffrey Holliman, proposed to the Chairman of LTE, Kenneth Robinson, that the Fleet line should be renamed the Jubilee line. However, this idea was initially rejected because of the additional costs involved. Nevertheless, the name was ultimately chosen for the line after Queen Elizabeth II's 1977 Silver Jubilee following a pledge made by the Conservatives in the Greater London Council election of 1977. The original choice of battleship grey for the line's colour was based on the naval meaning of the word fleet; this became a lighter grey, representing the silver colour of the Jubilee itself.

The line was officially opened by the Prince of Wales (now King Charles III) on 30 April 1979, with passenger services operating from 1 May 1979.

=== Proposed extensions ===
The Jubilee line of 1979 was to be the first of four phases of the project, but lack of funds meant that no further progress was made until the late 1990s.

- Phase 2 would have extended the line along Fleet Street to stations at Aldwych, Ludgate Circus, Cannon Street and Fenchurch Street. Parliamentary approval for this phase was granted on 27 July 1971.
- Phase 3 would have seen the line continue under the river to Surrey Docks (now Surrey Quays) station on the Windrush line, taking over both of the ELL's branches to New Cross Gate and New Cross stations, with an extension to Lewisham. Parliamentary approval for this phase as far as New Cross was granted on 5 August 1971 and the final section to Lewisham was granted approval on 9 August 1972.
- In 1973, an alternative plan for Phase 3 was devised to provide transport connections to the London Docklands area then being considered for regeneration as it was expected that the docks would be closed by the late 1980s. Initially proposed as a mainline service but later developed as a tube line extension for the Jubilee line, the new plan was developed over the next few years to a final form that considered extending the line parallel to the River Thames known informally as the 'River line'. This would have taken the line from Fenchurch Street to Thamesmead via St Katharine Docks, Wapping, Surrey Docks North, Millwall (near the later location of South Quay DLR station), North Greenwich, Custom House, Silvertown, Woolwich Arsenal, and then to Thamesmead Central. The depot would have been at Beckton, roughly on the site of the current Docklands Light Railway depot, and a shuttle service between there and Custom House was considered. Parliamentary approval for the route as far as Woolwich Arsenal including the Beckton branch was granted on 1 August 1980.
- Phase 4 was the possible continuation of the original Phase 3 Lewisham branch to take over suburban services on the Addiscombe and Hayes branches.

=== Millennium extension ===
Changes in land use, particularly the urban renewal of the Docklands area, resulted in the project to extend the line beyond Charing Cross being changed considerably in the 1970s, 1980s and 1990s. The Jubilee Line Extension, as the eventual project became known, opened in three stages in 1999. It split from the existing line at Green Park; the service to Charing Cross was discontinued (though still maintained for reversing trains at times of disruption, and for occasional use as a film set). The line extends as far as Stratford, with ten intermediate stations.

The new stations were designed to be "future-proof", with wide passageways, large numbers of escalators and lifts, and emergency exits. The stations were the first on the Underground to have platform edge doors, and were built to have step-free access throughout. The project was the single largest addition to the Underground in 25 years.

There have been other proposals to extend the line to serve the docks.

=== 24-hour weekend service ===
In mid-2014, TfL announced plans for a new Night Tube service, to include the entire Jubilee line. This would be an overnight service on Friday and Saturday nights. Its introduction was postponed because of a dispute between TfL and the three rail unions. The service eventually started on 7 October 2016.

The entire Night Tube network was suspended in March 2020 because of the COVID-19 pandemic, with the Jubilee line service being restored in May 2022.

== Current Jubilee line ==
Open since 1979, the Jubilee line is the newest line of the London Underground network. The trains were upgraded in 1997 to the 1996 stock. In 1999, trains began running to Stratford instead of Charing Cross, serving areas once poorly connected to the London Underground network.

=== Station features ===
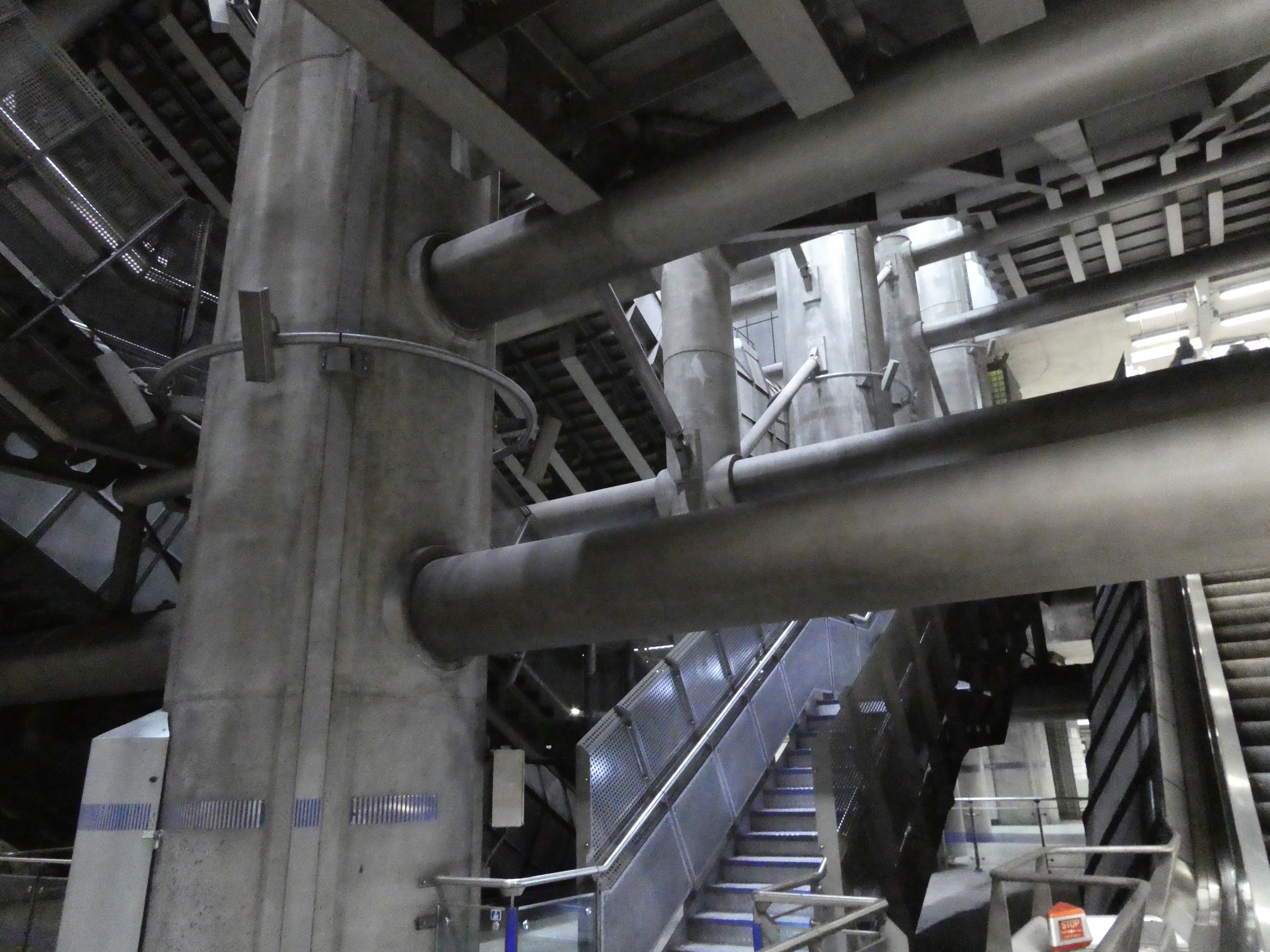
Contemporary Architecture of the Westminster Tube Station by Hopkins Architects

Stations north of Baker Street were not initially built specifically for the Jubilee line. In 1939, two new stations, St John's Wood and Swiss Cottage, were opened on the then-new Bakerloo line branch to Stanmore and have more traditional tube station features. Stations north of Finchley Road were opened by the Metropolitan Railway (now the Metropolitan line), but they became part of the Bakerloo line in 1939, with only Wembley Park being shared with the Metropolitan. In 1979, the Jubilee line took over the whole of the Stanmore branch of the Bakerloo line between Baker Street and Stanmore. New platforms were built for the Jubilee line at Baker Street (westbound platform; the eastbound one opened in 1939), Bond Street, Green Park and Charing Cross.

Stations on the Jubilee Line Extension feature:

- step-free access to street level
- contemporary architecture with overall design of the project led by Roland Paoletti, and stations designed by a different architect (e.g. Canary Wharf by Foster and Partners, North Greenwich by Alsop, Lyall and Störmer)
- substantially more escalators than previous stations (increasing the number of escalators on the Underground by half)
- modern fire safety standards including evacuation routes and ventilation shafts
- platform edge doors

The stations have subsequently been praised as exemplary pieces of 20th-century architecture. The platform edge doors were introduced primarily to prevent draughts underground and to assist in air flow. They also prevent people from falling or jumping onto the track, as well as the build-up of litter.

=== Rolling stock ===
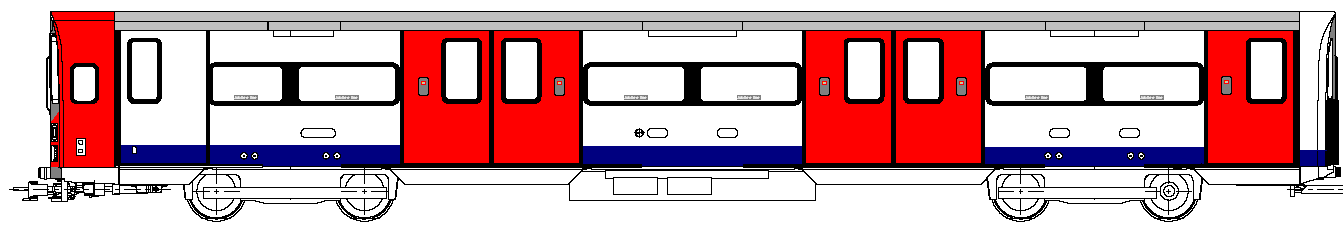
1996 tube stock driving car

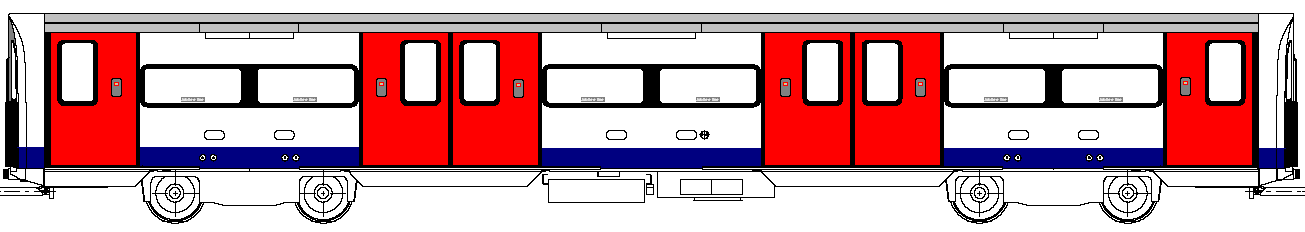
1996 tube stock trailer car

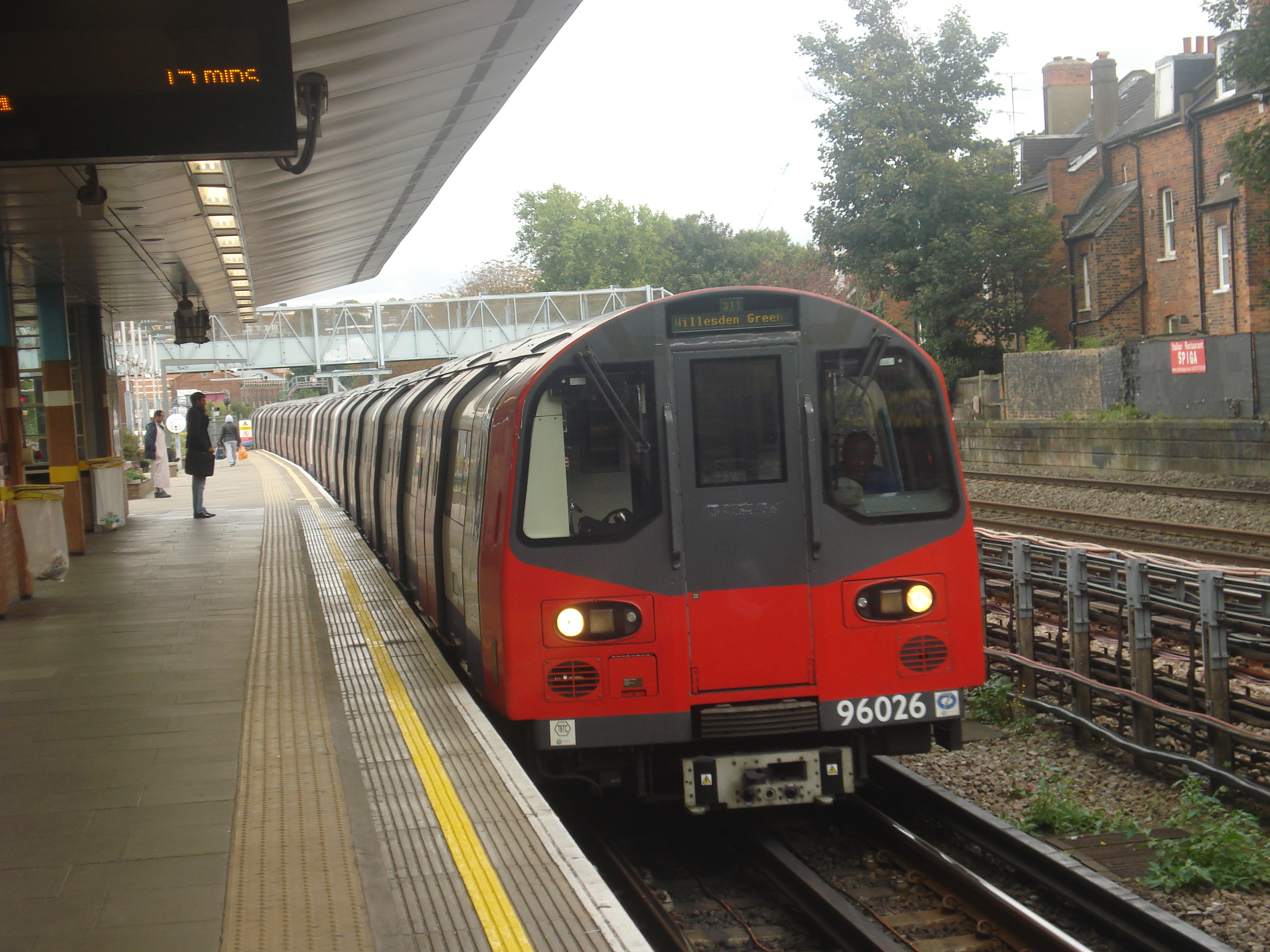
1996 stock to Willesden Green arriving at West Hampstead

When the Jubilee line was opened, it was operated by 1972 stock. From 1984, this was gradually replaced by the new 1983 stock; the displaced 1972 stock was transferred to the Bakerloo line. The 1983 stock proved to be unreliable and troublesome in service, with single-leaf doors making passenger loading and unloading a slower process than on other stock with wider door openings. With the construction of the Jubilee Line Extension, the opportunity was taken to introduce new trains, and today the line is worked by 1996 stock, which has an exterior similar to the 1995 stock in use on the Northern line.

The new stock has internal displays and automated announcements to provide passengers with information on the train's route. At first, the displayed text was static and showed only the destination of the train, but later showed also the name of the next station and interchanges there. Subsequent modifications introduced scrolling text. The 1996 stock uses a different motor from the 1995 stock and has a motor design similar to Class 365, Class 465, and Class 466 Networker trains.

=== Seventh car upgrade ===
The Jubilee line closed for three days from 25 December 2005 in order to add an extra car to each six-car train. The line had to be closed as six- and seven-car trains could not run in service at the same time, because the platform-edge doors at Jubilee Line Extension stations could not cater for both train lengths simultaneously. The signalling system was also modified to work with the longer trains.

An extra four complete seven-car trains were added to the fleet, bringing the total to 63. This enabled the period during which a full service could be run to be increased. The full fleet was not required to be available until full advantage could be taken of the new signalling system.

The result of the seventh-car upgrade was a 17% increase in capacity, allowing 6,000 more passengers per hour to use the line. Work was completed and the line reopened two days ahead of schedule, on 28 December 2005.

=== Signalling system ===
Since 2011, the Jubilee line has automatic train operation (ATO), using the SelTrac S40 moving block system. This provides capacity for 30 trains per hour.

Migration to the system was problematic. The programme of temporary closures for engineering work was criticised by local politicians as well as by the management of venues such as Wembley Stadium and The O2 because visitors to major concerts and sporting events had to travel by rail replacement bus. The management of the project by Tube Lines was criticised by London TravelWatch for its delayed delivery date, and a report by the London Assembly referred to the weekly line closures as "chaotic".

=== Mobile network connectivity ===
In March 2020, a leaky feeder based system was brought online in the Jubilee line tunnels, between Westminster and Canning Town. The development of this system arose from the Home Office's desire to provide coverage for its new Emergency Services Network on the London Underground. It allows passengers to receive 4G connectivity both in the tunnels and on station platforms.

When opened, it was the first section of London Underground tunnel to receive 4G and 5G connectivity. It was followed in December 2022 and into 2023 by a section of the Central line between Queensway and Holland Park and the Northern line between Archway and Mornington Crescent. TfL intends to deploy the technology across the entire Tube network by the mid-2020s.

== Future ==
=== Thamesmead branch ===
When North Greenwich Underground station was opened, it was built to enable a branch extension to be built eastwards to Thamesmead. There are currently no plans to construct this branch route.

=== West Hampstead interchange ===
Plans were put forward in 1974 and again in 2004 for a West Hampstead interchange, to connect the three West Hampstead stations in one complex. The plans were put on hold in 2007 due to uncertainty over the North London Line rail franchise. The proposal is now no longer possible, due to development in the area. Furthermore, both the Thameslink station and the Overground station have been rebuilt and upgraded in recent years, with step-free access added to both.

== Route ==
=== Map ===
The route of the Jubilee line

== Services ==
Jubilee line services in trains per hour (tph) are:

- Peak services at 30 tph in the core section between Stratford and West Hampstead:
  - 18 tph Stratford – Stanmore
  - 4 tph Stratford – Wembley Park
  - 4 tph Stratford – Willesden Green
  - 4 tph Stratford – West Hampstead
  - Some peak services originate or terminate at West Ham or Neasden
- Off-Peak services at 24 tph in the core section between Stratford and West Hampstead:
  - 12 tph Stratford – Stanmore
  - 4 tph Stratford – Wembley Park
  - 4 tph Stratford – Willesden Green
  - 4 tph Stratford – West Hampstead

== Stations ==
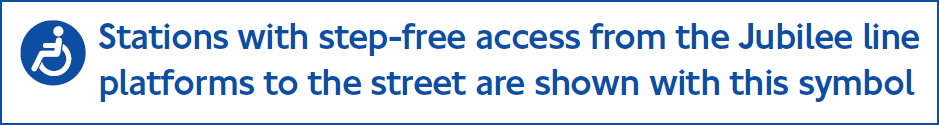
Notice explaining about step-free access. This can be found inside every Jubilee line train.

Station	Image	Roundel	Opened	Additional information
Stanmore			10 December 1932	^{map 1}
Canons Park			10 December 1932	Opened as Canons Park (Edgware); renamed 1933.^{map 2}
Queensbury			16 December 1934	^{map 3}
Kingsbury			10 December 1932	^{map 4}
Wembley Park (Note: At Wembley Park, there are six tracks, but Jubilee line trains only use the two innermost tracks.)			14 October 1893	Connects with Metropolitan line.^{map 5}
Neasden (Note: Between Finchley Road and Wembley Park, the Jubilee line right of way widens to four tracks. Jubilee line trains run on the two inner tracks. Flanking the Jubilee line are tracks used by the Metropolitan line. Metropolitan line trains run non-stop from Finchley Road to Wembley Park, skipping West Hampstead, Kilburn, Willesden Green, Dollis Hill and Neasden stations. Willesden Green and Neasden stations have platforms on the Metropolitan line tracks, but Metropolitan line trains call there only when normal working is disrupted or on irregular occasions when local events can cause a heavy increase in use of the stations.)			2 August 1880	^{map 6}
Dollis Hill			1 October 1909	^{map 7}
Willesden Green			24 November 1879	^{map 8}
Kilburn			24 November 1879	Opened as Kilburn & Brondesbury; renamed 25 September 1950.^{map 9}
West Hampstead			30 June 1879	Connects with Mildmay line and National Rail services.^{map 10}
Finchley Road			30 June 1879	Connects with Metropolitan line.^{map 11}
Swiss Cottage			20 November 1939	^{map 12}
St John's Wood			20 November 1939	^{map 13}
Baker Street			1 May 1979	Connects with Bakerloo, Circle, Hammersmith & City and Metropolitan lines.^{map 14}
Bond Street			1 May 1979	Connects with Central line and the Elizabeth line.^{map 15}
Green Park			1 May 1979	Connects with Piccadilly and Victoria lines.^{map 16}
Westminster			22 December 1999	Connects with Circle and District lines.^{map 17}
Waterloo			24 September 1999	Connects with Bakerloo, Northern and Waterloo & City lines, and National Rail services.^{map 18}
Southwark ( Waterloo East)			20 November 1999	Connects with National Rail services from Waterloo East.^{map 19}
London Bridge ( Trains to Gatwick)			7 October 1999	Connects with Northern line and National Rail services.^{map 20}
Bermondsey			17 September 1999	^{map 21}
Canada Water			17 September 1999	Connects with Windrush line.^{map 22}
Canary Wharf			17 September 1999	Connects with Docklands Light Railway and the Elizabeth line. ^{map 23}
North Greenwich ( from Greenwich Peninsula)			14 May 1999	Connects with the London Cable Car from Greenwich Peninsula.^{map 24}
Canning Town (Note: From Canning Town to Stratford low level, the Jubilee line right-of-way widens to four tracks. The Jubilee line trains use the two western tracks. Directly parallel to the line is the Docklands Light Railway Stratford International extension. Jubilee line trains make stops at Canning Town and West Ham, but bypass Star Lane, Abbey Road and Stratford High Street stations.)			14 May 1999	Connects with Docklands Light Railway.^{map 25}
West Ham			14 May 1999	Connects with District and Hammersmith & City lines, Docklands Light Railway and National Rail services.^{map 26}
Stratford			14 May 1999	Connects with Central line, Mildmay line, Elizabeth line, Docklands Light Railway and National Rail services.^{map 27}

=== Former stations ===
The Jubilee line platforms at Charing Cross are still used during service suspensions. For example, when the service is suspended between Green Park and Stratford, trains will terminate (and passengers alight) at Green Park before going to Charing Cross and using a scissors crossover to reverse back westbound. The platforms are a popular set for films and television because the platforms are contemporary and the trains used are current ones that appear in normal passenger service.

== Depots ==
The main servicing and maintenance depot on the Jubilee line is Stratford Market Depot ^{map 29} between the Stratford and West Ham stations. Trains are also stabled in Neasden Depot – sharing it with the Metropolitan line.

Stratford Market Depot was built as part of the Jubilee Line Extension in the late 1990s, as the Neasden Depot could not accommodate the increased number of trains required.

== Maps ==
- ^map 1Stanmore – 51°37′10″N 000°18′10″W
- ^map 2Canons Park – 51°36′28″N 000°17′41″W
- ^map 3Queensbury – 51°35′39″N 000°17′10″W
- ^map 4Kingsbury – 51°35′05″N 000°16′43″W
- ^map 5Wembley Park – 51°33′49″N 000°16′46″W
- ^map 6Neasden – 51°33′15″N 000°15′01″W
- ^map 7Dollis Hill – 51°33′07″N 000°14′19″W
- ^map 8Willesden Green – 51°32′57″N 000°13′18″W
- ^map 9Kilburn – 51°32′50″N 000°12′17″W
- ^map 10West Hampstead – 51°32′49″N 000°11′26″W
- ^map 11Finchley Road – 51°32′50″N 000°10′49″W
- ^map 12Swiss Cottage – 51°32′35″N 000°10′29″W
- ^map 13St John's Wood – 51°32′05″N 000°10′27″W
- ^map 14Baker Street – 51°31′19″N 000°09′25″W
- ^map 15Bond Street – 51°30′50″N 000°09′00″W
- ^map 16Green Park – 51°30′24″N 000°08′34″W
- ^map 17Westminster – 51°30′04″N 000°07′30″W
- ^map 18Waterloo – 51°30′09″N 000°06′47″W
- ^map 19Southwark – 51°30′11″N 000°06′18″W
- ^map 20London Bridge – 51°30′18″N 000°05′10″W
- ^map 21Bermondsey – 51°29′53″N 000°03′50″W
- ^map 22Canada Water – 51°29′54″N 000°03′00″W
- ^map 23Canary Wharf – 51°30′13″N 000°01′07″W
- ^map 24North Greenwich – 51°30′02″N 000°00′13″E
- ^map 25Canning Town – 51°30′50″N 000°00′30″E
- ^map 26West Ham – 51°31′41″N 000°00′14″E
- ^map 27Stratford – 51°32′32″N 000°00′12″W
- ^map 28Neasden Depot – 51°33′28″N 000°15′31″W
- ^map 29Stratford Market Depot – 51°31′59″N 000°00′04″E

== See also ==
- Jubilee Line corruption trial
- List of crossings of the River Thames
- Tunnels underneath the River Thames

West:	Crossings of the River Thames	East:
Westminster Bridge	Between Westminster and Waterloo	Hungerford Bridge and Golden Jubilee Bridges
Canary Wharf – Rotherhithe Ferry	Between Canada Water and Canary Wharf	Docklands Light Railway between Island Gardens and Cutty Sark
Greenwich Foot Tunnel	Between Canary Wharf and North Greenwich	Blackwall Tunnels
Blackwall Tunnels	Between North Greenwich and Canning Town	Millennium Dome electricity cable tunnel (no public access); London Cable Car
