= FNY =

FNY may refer to:

- Finchley Road & Frognal railway station, London, National Rail station code
- French Navy, the maritime arm of the French Armed Forces (ICAO airport code)
