= West Hampstead railway station =

London Overground station

West Hampstead
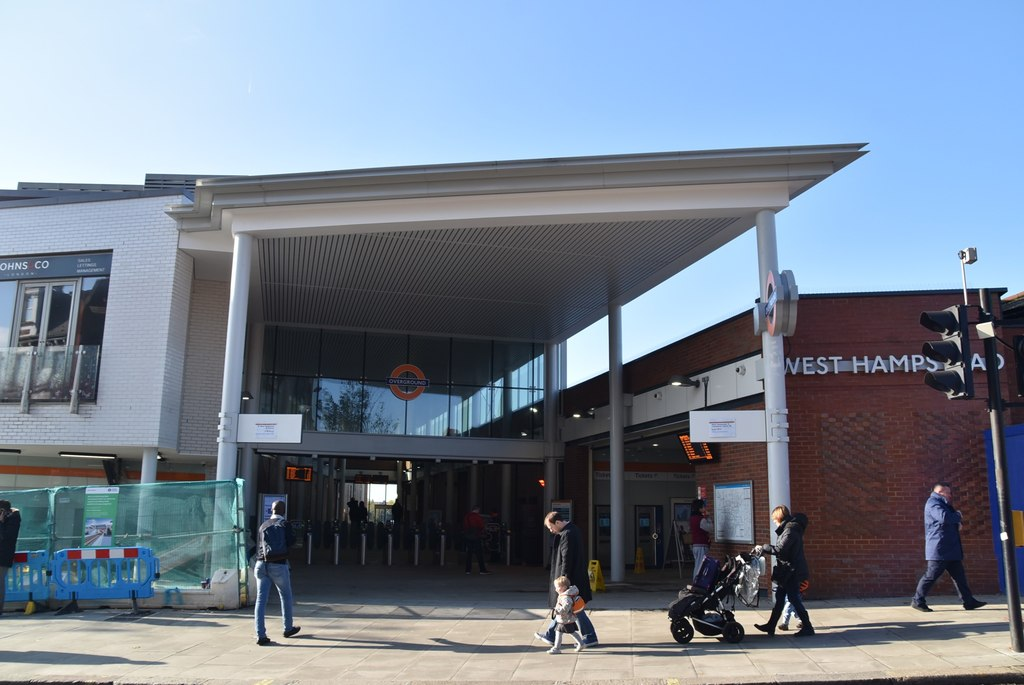
- Interactive map of West Hampstead

General information
- Location: West Hampstead
- Local authority: London Borough of Camden
- Managed by: London Overground
- Owner: Network Rail
- Station code: WHD
- DfT category: D
- Number of platforms: 2
- Accessible: Yes
- Fare zone: 2
- OSI: West Hampstead; West Hampstead Thameslink

National Rail annual entry and exit
- 2020–21: ▼1.554 million
- Interchange: ▼0.200 million
- 2021–22: ▲2.898 million
- Interchange: ▲0.447 million
- 2022–23: ▲3.297 million
- Interchange: ▲0.828 million
- 2023–24: ▲3.702 million
- Interchange: ▼0.622 million
- 2024–25: ▲3.945 million
- Interchange: ▼0.574 million

Key dates
- 1 March 1888: Opened as West End Lane
- 1975: Renamed West Hampstead

Other information
- External links: Departures; Facilities
- Coordinates: 51.5473°N 0.1918°W

West Hampstead is a station on the Mildmay line of the London Overground, located on West End Lane in the London Borough of Camden. Located in London fare zone 2, it is situated between Brondesbury and Finchley Road & Frognal stations.

Two out-of-station interchanges exist with West Hampstead Overground station. One of these is with West Hampstead tube station on the Jubilee line of the London Underground, and the other is with West Hampstead Thameslink station for National Rail services operated by Thameslink.

== History ==
The station opened on 1 March 1888 and was called West End Lane until 1975, when it became West Hampstead (making it one of three stations of essentially the same name along West End Lane). The train service was provided by the North London Railway until 1909, when management of the NLR was taken over by the London and North Western Railway. Complete amalgamation with the LNWR followed in 1922, and the LNWR then amalgamated with other railways to form the LMS from January 1923. The LMS became the London Midland Region of British Railways on nationalisation in 1948, and the shortened brand name British Rail was used from 1965. The station and the rest of the North London Line was included in the reorganised BR business Network SouthEast in 1986.

Following the privatisation of British Rail, the station was managed by the Silverlink franchise (National Express) from 1997 until 2007, when operations passed to London Overground.

After privatisation, Anglia Railways ran a regional service for a while between Norwich and Basingstoke which called here. This service, known as London Crosslink, was discontinued in Autumn 2002 because of a shortage of train paths on the North London line and the financial return being less than forecast.

The station was initially refurbished towards the end of 2007, to coincide with the takeover of the line by London Overground. The station was comprehensively upgraded in the late 2010s thanks in part to the adjacent Ballymore West Hampstead Square development. The upgrade included a new station building, wider platforms and step free access, and was completed in December 2019. The works were designed by Mott MacDonald engineers and BPR Architects.

== Accidents and incidents ==
- On 23 February 1937, an express freight train, hauled by LMS Hughes Crab 2-6-0 No. 2765, was derailed near the station.

== Development ==
A West Hampstead interchange proposal was put forward in 2004 by Chiltern Railways which would link the three West Hampstead stations with subterranean walkways. New platforms would be built for the Chiltern Main Line, and possibly also for the Metropolitan line, and the Thameslink and London Overground (formerly Silverlink) stations would be relocated on the east side of West End Lane. The redevelopment would involve demolishing existing buildings and the redevelopment of West End Lane as "a tree-lined boulevard". The plans were put on hold in 2007 due to uncertainty over the North London line rail franchise. This has now been shelved with Network Rail instead redeveloping the Thameslink station by installing a second footbridge with lift access leading to a new station building on Iverson Road.

In early 2008, the London Group of the Campaign for Better Transport published a plan for an off-road, mainly orbital North and West London Light Railway, sharing the orbital Dudding Hill Line freight corridor, and taking over at least one of the two Midland Railway freight lines which run through the neighbouring West Hampstead Thameslink station.

== Connections ==
London Buses routes 139, 328 and C11 serve the station.

== Services ==
All services at West Hampstead are operated by London Overground as part of the Mildmay line using Class 378 EMUs.

The typical off-peak service in trains per hour is:

- 8 tph to Stratford via Camden Road
- 4 tph to Richmond
- 4 tph to Clapham Junction

During the late evenings, the services to and from Clapham Junction do not operate.

Preceding station	London Overground	Following station
Brondesbury towards Clapham Junction or Richmond	Mildmay line North London line and West London line	Finchley Road & Frognal towards Stratford
Historical Railways
Willesden Junction	Anglia Railways London Crosslink	Camden Road
