= Finchley Road railway station =

Former railway station in England

Coordinates: 51.5487°N 0.1822°W

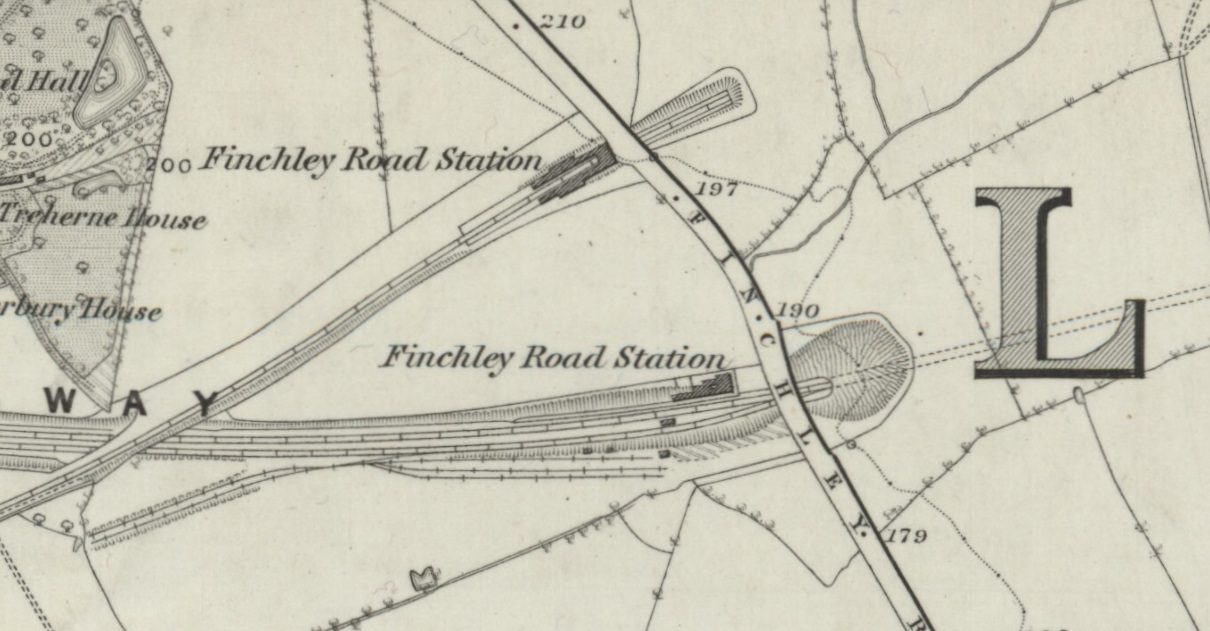
Finchley Road station (bottom) on 1870 Ordnance Survey map

Finchley Road railway station was built by the Midland Railway (MR) in 1868 on its extension to St. Pancras. Situated at the north end of the Belsize Tunnels, it served the newly developed area of St John's Wood.

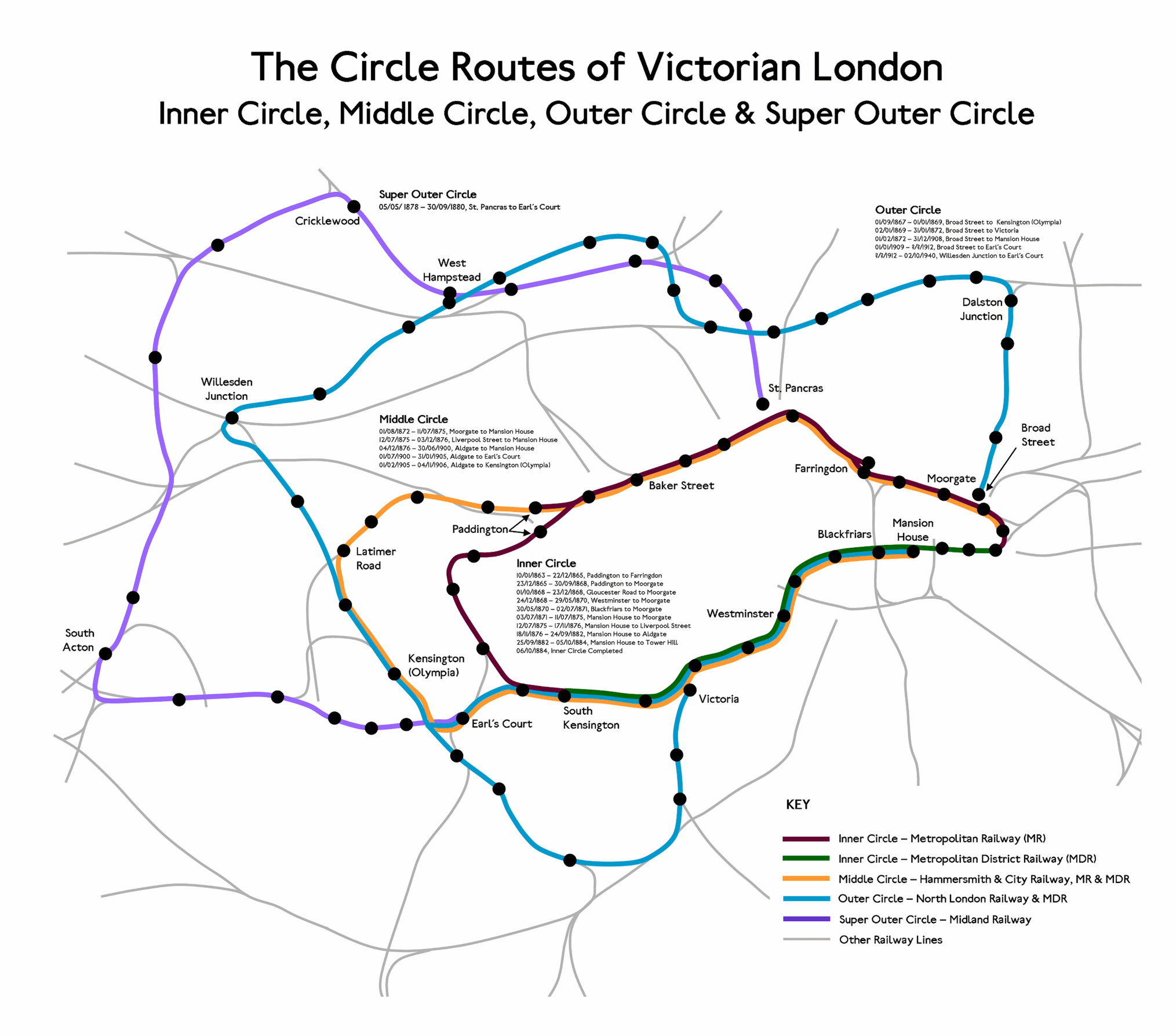
The Victorian Super Outer Circle route, passing through Finchley Road station

For a short period from 1878 until 1880, the MR operated the Super Outer Circle service through the station from St. Pancras to Earl's Court Underground station via tracks through Cricklewood, then using the Dudding Hill Line to South Acton and Hammersmith.

The station was rebuilt in 1884 and closed in 1927. Very little of the station buildings other than rubble remain, though the island platform's contours still determine the track layout. As of February 2009 the station area was being offered for sale with a view to redevelopment.

The present-day Finchley Road & Frognal railway station is on the old London and North Western Railway line from Willesden to Camden Town, which crosses the MR line a little way north.

| Preceding station | Disused railways | Following station |
|---|---|---|
| West Hampstead | Midland Railway; Midland Main Line | Haverstock Hill |
