= West Hampstead tube station =

London Underground station

West Hampstead
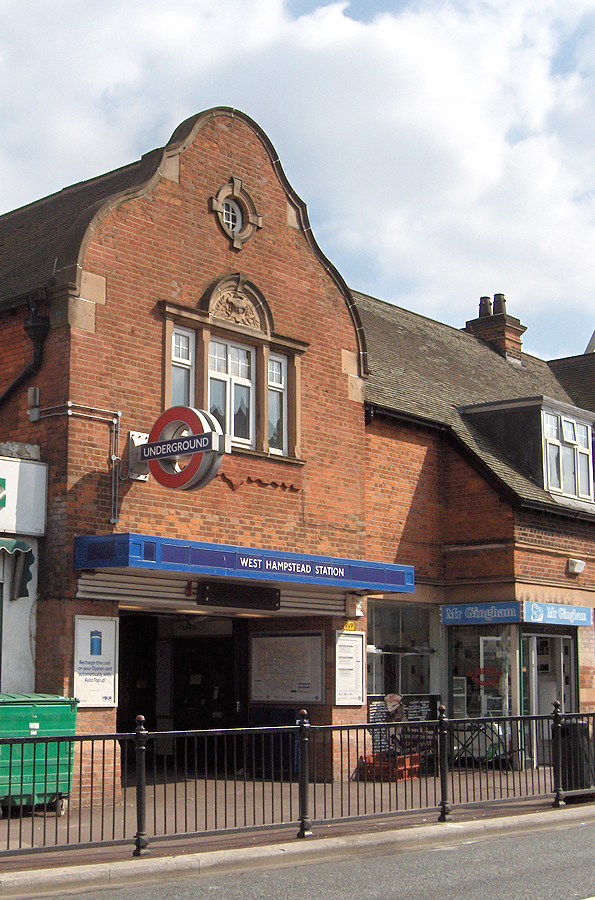
- Station entrance
- Interactive map of West Hampstead

General information
- Location: West Hampstead
- Local authority: London Borough of Camden
- Managed by: London Underground
- Number of platforms: 2
- Fare zone: 2
- OSI: West Hampstead; West Hampstead Thameslink

London Underground annual entry and exit
- 2020: ▼4.96 million
- 2021: ▼4.47 million
- 2022: ▲7.10 million
- 2023: ▲7.39 million
- 2024: ▲8.43 million

Key dates
- 30 June 1879: Opened (MR)
- 20 November 1939: Start (Bakerloo line)
- 1 May 1979: End (Bakerloo line)
- 1 May 1979: Start (Jubilee line)

Other information
- External links: TfL station info page
- Coordinates: 51.54694°N 0.19056°W

West Hampstead is a London Underground station in West Hampstead. It is located on West End Lane between Broadhurst Gardens and Blackburn Road, and is in London fare zone 2. The station is on the Jubilee line, between Kilburn and Finchley Road stations. It is 100 m (110 yd) from West Hampstead station on the London Overground's Mildmay line and 200 m (220 yd) from West Hampstead Thameslink station. Metropolitan line trains also pass through the station, but do not stop.

== History ==
The station was opened on 30 June 1879 by the Metropolitan Railway (now the Metropolitan line) when it extended its tracks from Swiss Cottage. The station acted as the temporary terminus of the branch until it was further extended to Willesden Green on 24 November that year. The original station had two tracks with facing platforms; the booking office was to the south of the current surface building location with separate stairs to each platform. Consequential to the extension of the Great Central Railway displacing the Metropolitan Railway toward the north, this construction was replaced by an island platform overlapping the position of the previous Up platform.

On 20 November 1939, most stopping services were transferred to the Bakerloo line when it took over operations on the Stanmore branch; at this time the platform was rebuilt in the Underground's standard style, but the station building was retained. Stopping services were transferred to the Jubilee line on 1 May 1979. Metropolitan line services run past the station on their own tracks either side of the Jubilee Line having not served the station (a few trains in the early morning and late at night) since the connection between the Metropolitan and Jubilee Lines at Finchley Road was removed as part of the preparation for automatic operation of the Jubilee Line.

In 2003, Chiltern Railways unveiled a proposal for West Hampstead interchange, a development that would allow passenger interchange among five different Tube and railway lines. In 2008 it was proposed that the North and West London Light Railway could serve the station. The West Hampstead interchange proposal is now no longer possible, due to development in the area.

=== Step free access ===
Both the nearby Thameslink station and the Overground station were rebuilt and upgraded in 2011 and 2019 respectively, with step free access added to both stations.

Local community groups and politicians have pushed for step-free access to be provided at the Underground station. As part of the approval of redevelopment of the O2 Centre by developers Landsec in 2023, £10 million was secured for future step-free access at the Underground station. In July 2023, TfL announced that West Hampstead was one of several stations that could become step-free, depending on available funding. In 2025, a property developer proposed replacing light industrial units adjacent to the station with student accommodation and new homes. This proposal would allow for TfL to expand the station to provide step-free access, as well as widen the narrow pavement outside the entrance.

== Connections ==
London Buses routes 139, 328 and C11 serve the station.

== See also ==
- Stations in West Hampstead

Preceding station	London Underground	Following station
Kilburn towards Stanmore	Jubilee line	Finchley Road towards Stratford
Former services
Kilburn towards Stanmore	Bakerloo line Stanmore branch (1939–1979)	Finchley Road towards Elephant & Castle
Kilburn towards Stanmore	Metropolitan line Stanmore branch (1932–1939)	Finchley Road towards Baker Street or Aldgate
