= Kilburn tube station =

London Underground station

Kilburn
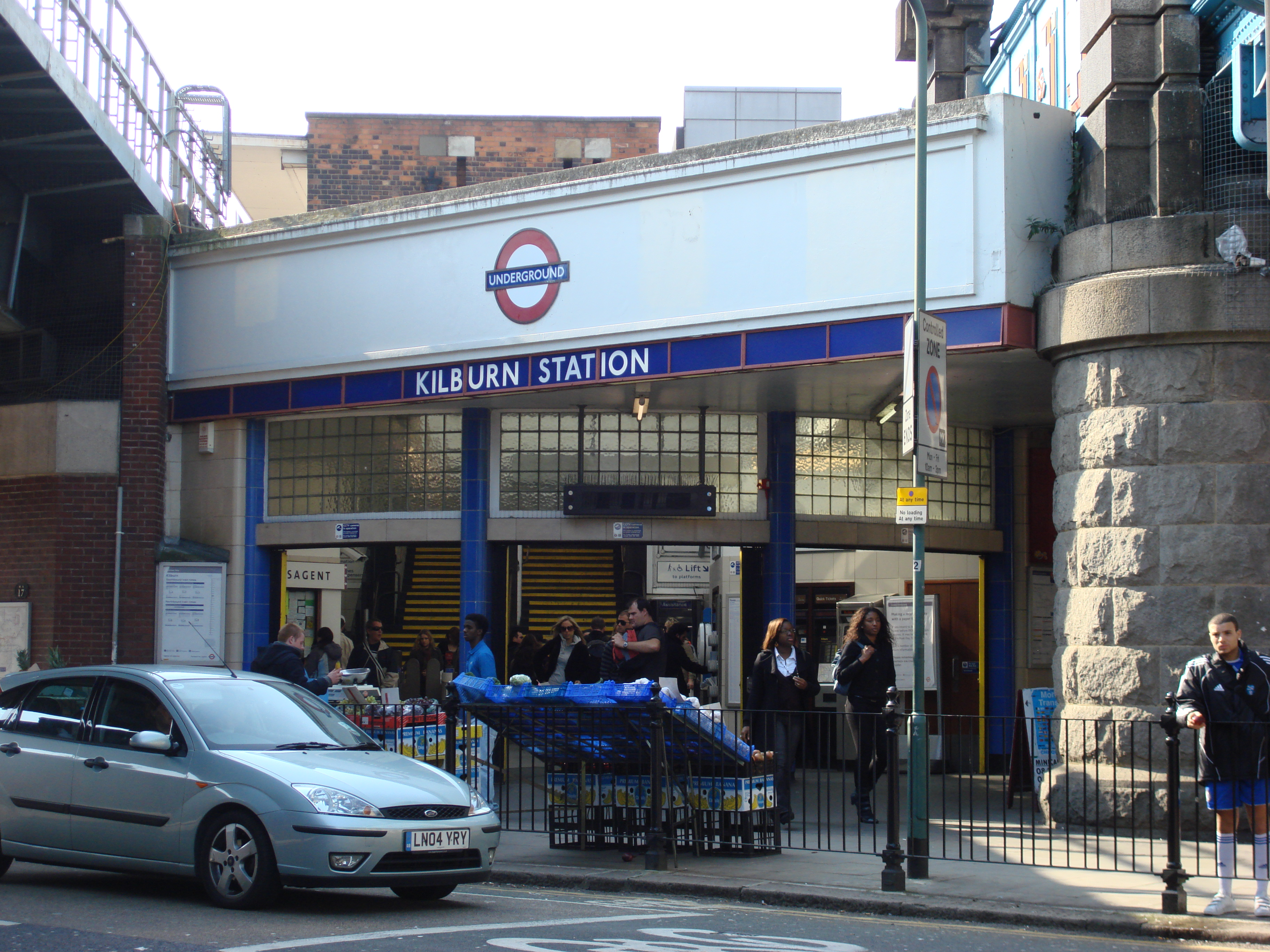
- Station entrance
- Interactive map of Kilburn

General information
- Location: Brondesbury Park
- Local authority: London Borough of Brent
- Managed by: London Underground
- Number of platforms: 2
- Accessible: Yes
- Fare zone: 2
- OSI: Brondesbury

London Underground annual entry and exit
- 2020: ▼3.95 million
- 2021: ▼3.30 million
- 2022: ▲5.52 million
- 2023: ▲5.57 million
- 2024: ▼5.55 million

Railway companies
- Original company: Metropolitan Railway

Key dates
- 24 November 1879: Opened as Kilburn & Brondesbury
- 20 November 1939: Bakerloo line service introduced
- 7 December 1940: Metropolitan line service ceased
- 25 September 1950: Renamed Kilburn
- 1 May 1979: Bakerloo line service replaced by Jubilee line

Other information
- External links: TfL station info page
- Coordinates: 51.54722°N 0.20472°W

Kilburn is a London Underground station in Kilburn, north-west London. It is on the Jubilee line between Willesden Green and West Hampstead stations, and is in London fare zone 2. The station is located on the A5 Kilburn High Road or Shoot-up Hill, approximately 0.1 miles (0.16 km) north of Brondesbury station. Metropolitan line trains typically bypass the station without stopping.

The station was first opened on the Metropolitan line in 1879 as part of an extension to Willesden Green. The two-track line through the station was quadrupled in the 1910s. After merging to form the London Passenger Transport Board in 1933, Metropolitan line services through the station were transferred to the Stanmore branch of the Bakerloo line, and the station was extensively rebuilt. This branch was then transferred again to the Jubilee line in 1979. The 1930s station building remains, and was refurbished in 2005. The station is wheelchair accessible and has frequent train services to Central London.

== Location ==
Kilburn serves the area of the name itself, which is a moderate commercial district and dense residential suburb. The place was said to be named after Cylla, then a Saxon, or from the 1121 Saxon term "Cuneburna" for "the cattle stream". The earliest settlements near the station date back to 1847. The station is on the A5 Kilburn High Road or Shoot-up Hill. The road connects several stations including Brondesbury and Kilburn High Road. Nearby landmarks include the Red Lion, Kiln Theatre, Kilburn Grange Park, ICMP London and Kingsgate Primary School.

== History ==
The Metropolitan Railway (MR) first opened a separate line called the Metropolitan and St. John's Wood Railway (M&SJWR) from Baker Street to Swiss Cottage. Due to low passenger numbers, the MR was considering options to extend the M&SJWR further to provide new routes into Central London. (Note: The original intention was to extend to Hampstead, but only the route up to Swiss Cottage was completed. The railway was instead extended in a north-western direction.) Permission was granted to extend the line up to Harrow via Kilburn in 1874.

The station opened as Kilburn and Brondesbury on 24 November 1879 which formed part of the extension to Willesden Green. As there was an increase in traffic, the tracks from Finchley Road to Harrow (now Harrow-on-the-Hill) were to be quadrupled. Four-track operation started between Finchley Road and Kilburn in 1913, extending to Wembley Park in 1915. This created a bottleneck between Finchley Road and Baker Street.

On 1 July 1933, the MR amalgamated with other Underground railways, tramway companies and bus operators to form the London Passenger Transport Board, and the MR became the Metropolitan line of London Transport. Due to a bottleneck between Finchley Road and Baker Street, the Bakerloo line was to extend to Finchley Road and Stanmore to relieve congestion on the Metropolitan line. The extension would also take over the intermediate stations, including Kiburn. Construction began in 1936 and Kilburn became part of the Stanmore branch of the Bakerloo line on 20 November 1939, at which time the station was extensively rebuilt. Metropolitan line services through the station ceased on 7 December 1940, where services were fully transferred to the Bakerloo line. The station was renamed to its current name on 25 September 1950.

During World War II and throughout the 1950s and early 1960s consideration was given to various routes connecting north-west and south-east London via Central London. The Victoria line was given priority and it was not until after construction of that line started that detailed planning began for the new line. It was planned to run in an east–west direction along Fleet Street, and was to be named the Fleet line. Lack of funding meant that only the first stage of the proposed line, from Baker Street to Charing Cross was approved in July 1969; funding was agreed in August 1971. (Note: Funding for Stage 1 of the line was to come from the Greater London Council and central government in the ratio 1:3.) Construction began in 1972. In 1977, the name of the line was changed to the Jubilee line, to mark the Queen's Silver Jubilee that year. (Note: The decision to change the name of the line was made by the Greater London Council, although the line was not expected to open until 1978. Subsequent delays in the installation of escalators and fitting-out of stations pushed the opening date into 1979.) Trial running of trains began in August 1978 and the Jubilee line opened on 1 May the next year. The line had been officially opened by Prince Charles the previous day, starting with a train journey from Green Park to Charing Cross. This replaced the Stanmore branch of the Bakerloo line, with the initial section operating between Stanmore and Charing Cross. (Note: Work on the Fleet line's stages 2 and 3 did not proceed and it was not until 1992 that an alternative route to Stratford was approved.)

== Design ==
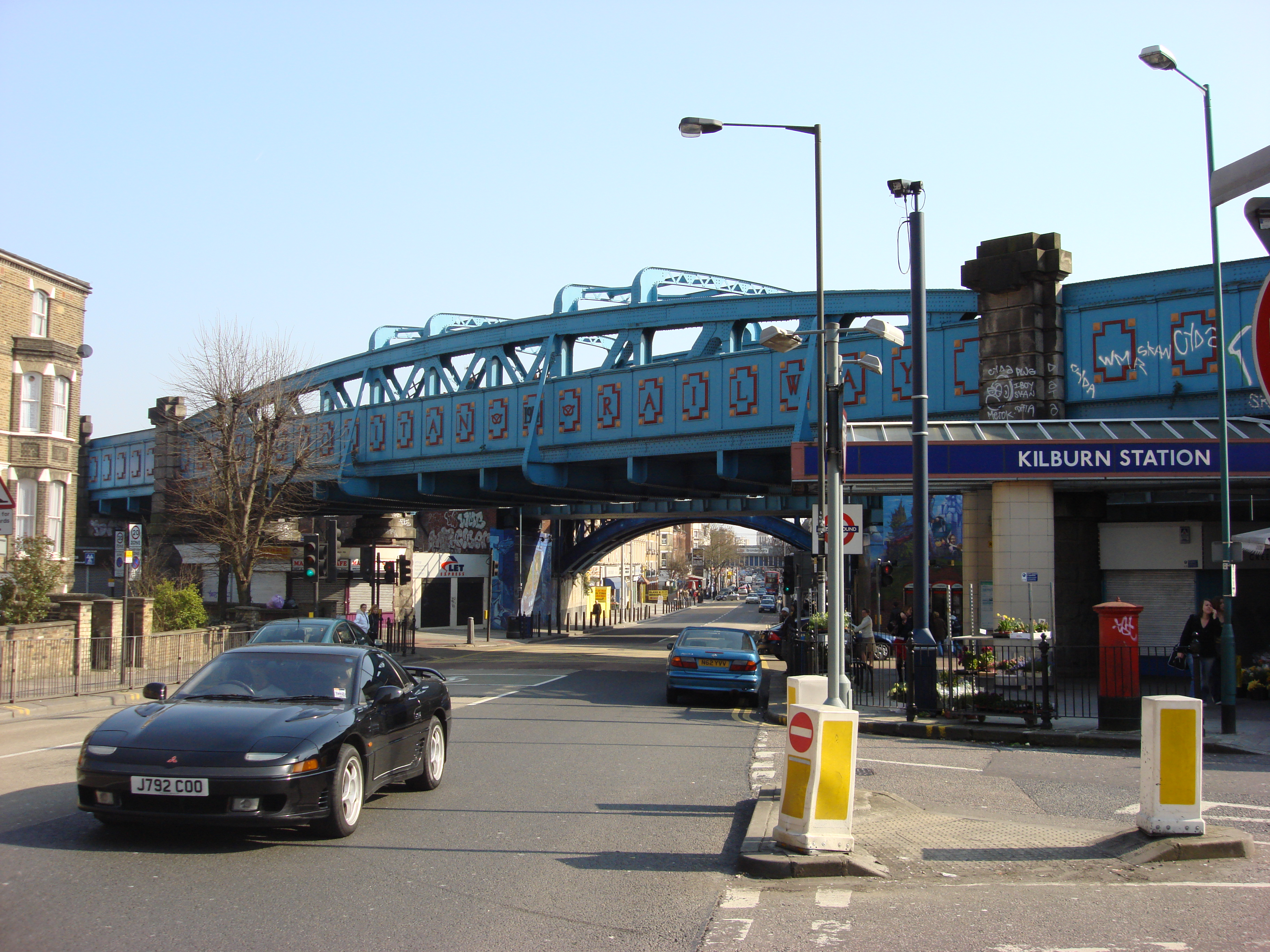
The viaduct at Kilburn, spelling out the words "Metropolitan Railway"

One of the bridges just beyond the station which carries the four-track line over the A5 Kilburn High Road (then known as Watling Street) has the company name "METROPOLITAN RAILWAY" fixed on the sides of the viaduct. The numbers on the viaduct read "1914", around the time when the Metropolitan Railway quadrupled its tracks from Finchley Road to Harrow-on-the-Hill.

In 2005, major refurbishing works took place, which involved the station being fully repainted, receiving a new CCTV system, better lighting, upgraded PA systems, new toilets, and new train indicator boards at the ticket hall and platform level. A lift was also installed at the station to provide step-free access from street to platform level. Heritage features were also retained throughout the refurbishment.

== Services and connections ==
=== Services ===
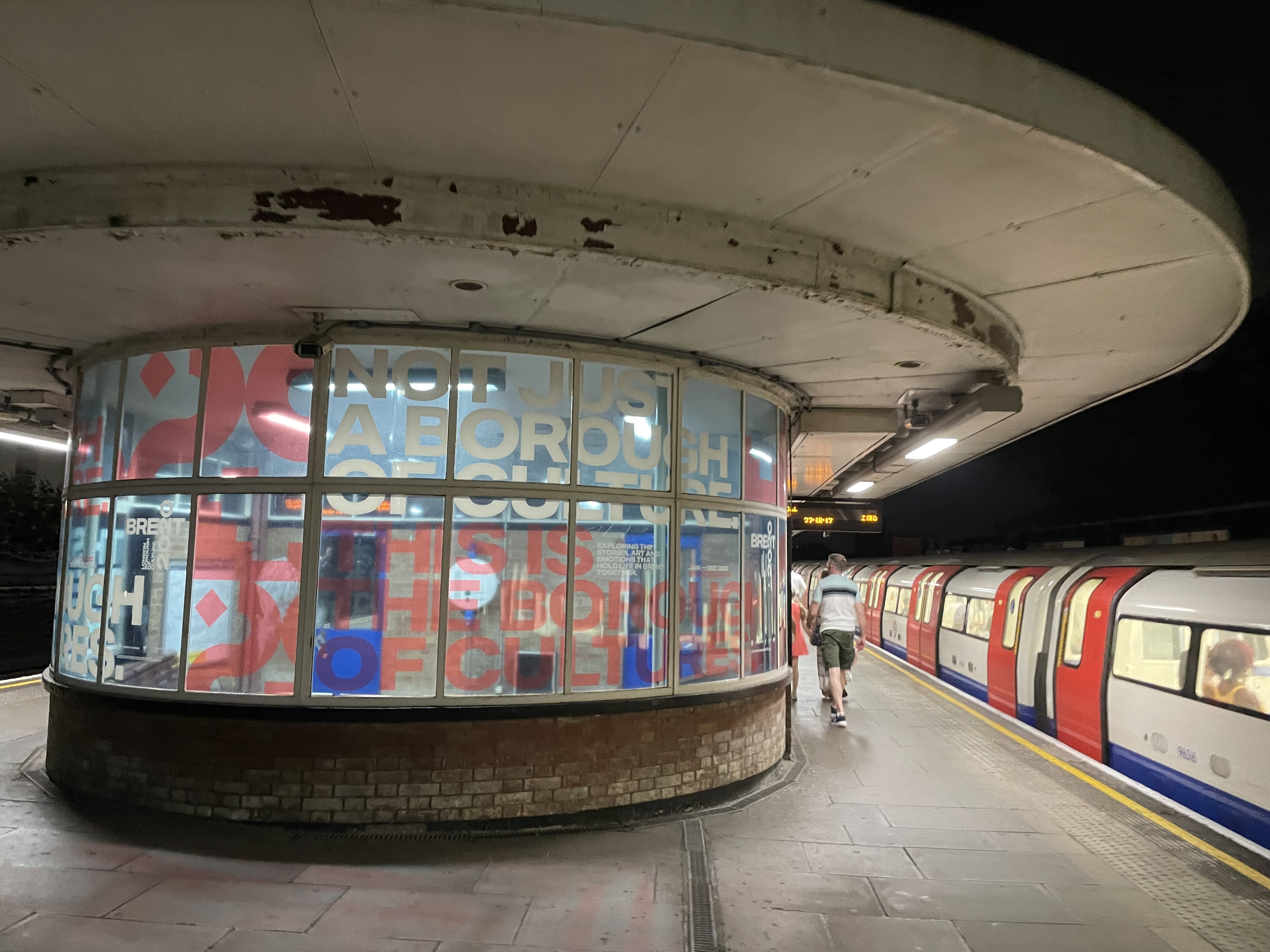
The station at night with a Jubilee line train in the northbound platform

Kilburn station is on the Jubilee line in London fare zone 2. It is between Willesden Green to the north and West Hampstead to the south. The typical off-peak service in trains per hour (tph) is:

- 24 tph eastbound (southbound) to Stratford
- 16 tph westbound (northbound) to Stanmore
- 4 tph westbound (northbound) to Willesden Green
- 4 tph westbound (northbound) to Wembley Park

The Metropolitan line passes through the station without stopping. Night tube services began operation on the night of 7 October 2016, two months after the Central and Victoria line services began. 6 tph operate in both directions throughout the entire line.

Preceding station	London Underground	Following station
Willesden Green towards Stanmore	Jubilee line	West Hampstead towards Stratford
Former services
Willesden Green towards Stanmore	Bakerloo line Stanmore branch (1939–1979)	West Hampstead towards Elephant & Castle
Willesden Green towards Stanmore	Metropolitan line Stanmore branch (1932–1939)	West Hampstead towards Baker Street or Aldgate

=== Connections ===
London Buses routes 16, 32, 189, 316, 332, school route 632, and night route N16 serve the station.

Kilburn is close to Brondesbury station on the London Overground’s Mildmay line, with a walking distance of 0.1 miles (0.16 km). This route is also considered as an official out-of-station interchange by Transport for London.

== Notes and references ==
=== Bibliography ===
- Bruce, J Graeme (1983). Steam to Silver. A history of London Transport Surface Rolling Stock. Capital Transport. ISBN 978-0-904711-45-5.
- Demuth, Tim; Leboff, David (1999). No Need To Ask. Harrow Weald: Capital Transport. ISBN 185414-215-1.
- Green, Oliver (1987). The London Underground: An illustrated history. Ian Allan. ISBN 978-0-7110-1720-7.
- Horne, Mike (2000). The Jubilee Line. Capital Transport. ISBN 978-1-85414-220-7.
- Horne, Mike (2003). The Metropolitan Line. Capital Transport. ISBN 978-1-85414-275-7.
- Jackson, Alan (1986). London's Metropolitan Railway. David & Charles. ISBN 978-0-7153-8839-6.
- Rose, Douglas (1999) [1980]. The London Underground, A Diagrammatic History (7th ed.). London: Douglas Rose/Capital Transport. ISBN 978-1-85414-219-1.
- Rose, Douglas (2016) [1980]. The London Underground, A Diagrammatic History (9th ed.). Douglas Rose/Capital Transport. ISBN 978-1-85414-404-1.
- Wallinger, Mark; Self, Will; Warner, Marina; Wolmar, Christian; Bal, Thierry; Coysh, Louise; Dillon, Tamsin (6 October 2014). Labyrinth: A Journey Through London's Underground by Mark Wallinger. Art / Books. ISBN 978-1-90897-016-9.
