= West Hampstead Thameslink railway station =

National rail (Thameslink) station in London, England

West Hampstead Thameslink
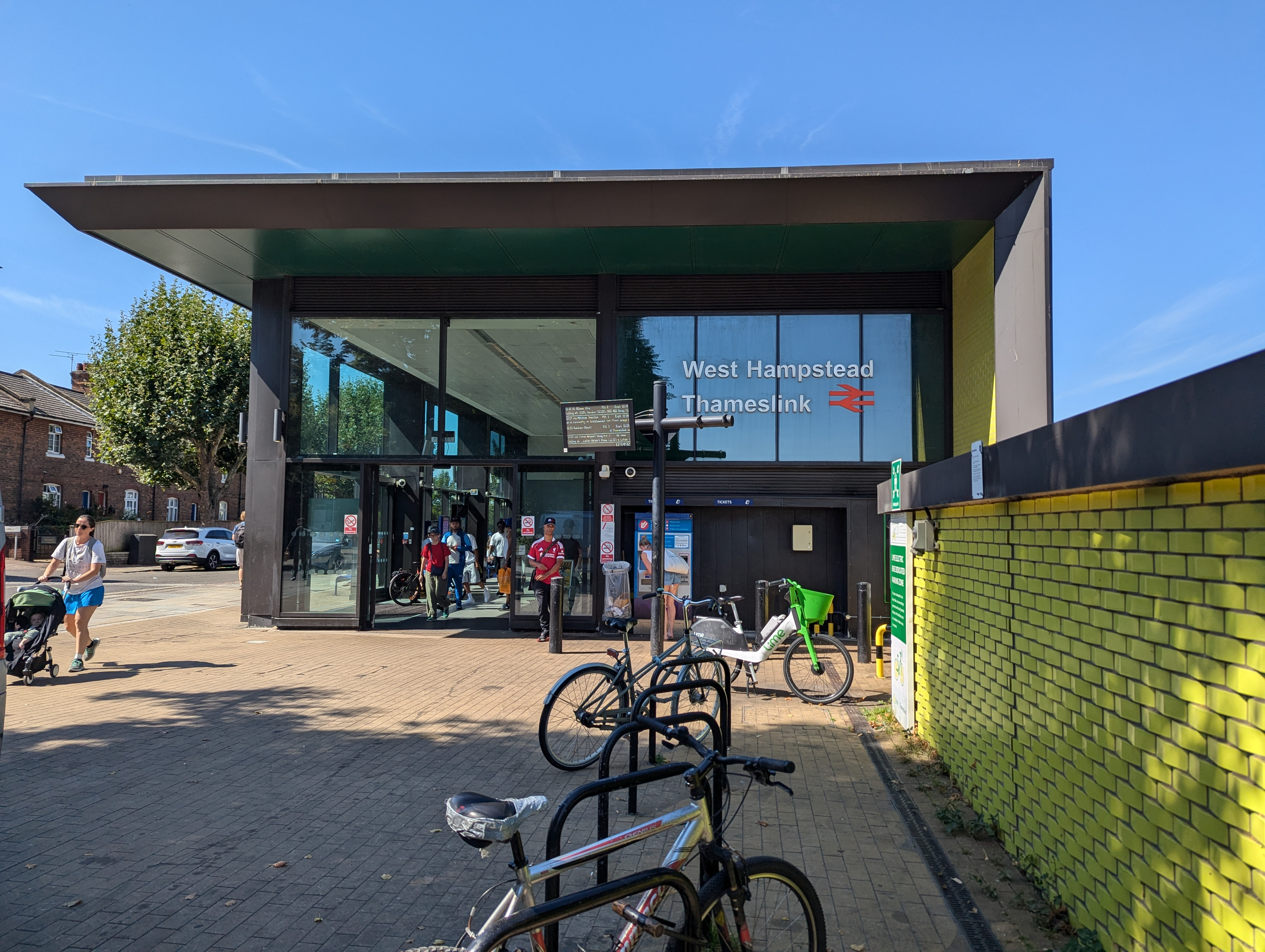
- Station building entrance in August 2025
- Interactive map of West Hampstead Thameslink

General information
- Location: West Hampstead
- Local authority: London Borough of Camden
- Managed by: Thameslink
- Station code: WHP
- DfT category: E
- Number of platforms: 4
- Accessible: Yes
- Fare zone: 2
- OSI: West Hampstead; West Hampstead

National Rail annual entry and exit
- 2020–21: ▼1.091 million
- Interchange: ▼0.325 million
- 2021–22: ▲2.233 million
- Interchange: ▲0.659 million
- 2022–23: ▲2.862 million
- Interchange: ▲1.057 million
- 2023–24: ▲2.947 million
- Interchange: ▼0.986 million
- 2024–25: ▲3.148 million
- Interchange: ▼0.936 million

Railway companies
- Original company: Midland Railway
- Pre-grouping: Midland Railway
- Post-grouping: London, Midland and Scottish Railway

Key dates
- 1 March 1871: Opened as West End for Kilburn and Hampstead
- 1 July 1903: Renamed West End
- 1 April 1904: Renamed West End and Brondesbury
- 1 September 1905: Renamed West Hampstead
- 25 September 1950: Renamed West Hampstead Midland
- 16 May 1988: Renamed West Hampstead Thameslink

Other information
- External links: Departures; Facilities
- Coordinates: 51.5484°N 0.1930°W

West Hampstead Thameslink is a National Rail station on the Midland Main Line and is served by Thameslink trains as part of the Thameslink route between Kentish Town and Cricklewood. The station is in London fare zone 2.

== History ==
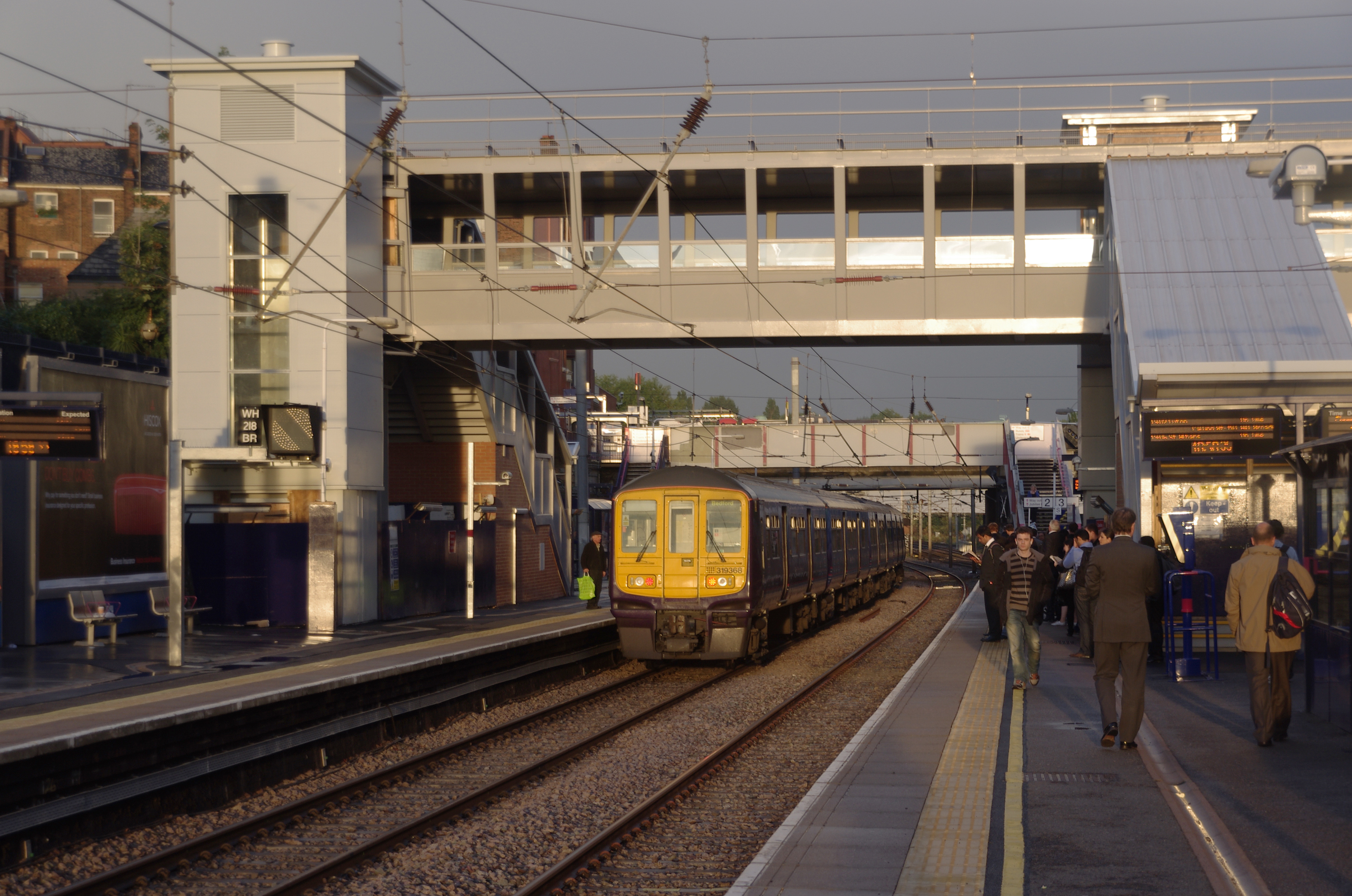
First Capital Connect EMU 319368 calls with a Sutton Loop service.

The station was built by the Midland Railway on its extension to St. Pancras, to serve the newly developed area around the hamlet of West End. It opened on 1 March 1871, and was originally named West End for Kilburn and Hampstead.

For a short period from 1878 the station formed part of the Super Outer Circle, Midland trains running through from St Pancras to Earl's Court via Acton Central and Turnham Green.

It was renamed several times: to West End on 1 July 1903; to West End and Brondesbury on 1 April 1904; to West Hampstead on 1 September 1905; West Hampstead Midland on 25 September 1950; and finally West Hampstead Thameslink on 16 May 1988. It was popular for many years for people taking a day out on Hampstead Heath and those visiting the chalybeate springs in Hampstead itself.

Oyster Pay as you go was introduced in late 2007.

From March 2009, Southeastern and Thameslink began running some peak hour trains from Sevenoaks to Luton, though in the off-peak these services turn back at Kentish Town.

== Connections ==
London Buses routes 139, 328 and C11 serve the station.

== Services ==
All services at West Hampstead Thameslink are operated by Thameslink using Class 700 EMUs.

The typical off-peak service in trains per hour is:

- 2 tph to Bedford (non-stop to and from St Albans City)
- 2 tph to Luton (all stations except Cricklewood and Hendon)
- 4 tph to St Albans City (all stations)
- 2 tph to Brighton via Gatwick Airport
- 2 tph to Rainham via Dartford
- 4 tph to Sutton (2 of these run via Mitcham Junction and 2 run via Wimbledon)

During the peak hours, the station is served by additional services between Luton and Orpington via Catford.

The station is also served by a night service between Bedford and Three Bridges on Sunday to Friday nights.

Preceding station	National Rail	Following station
St Albans City or Brent Cross West or Cricklewood	Thameslink Thameslink	Kentish Town or London St Pancras International
	Historical railways	
Cricklewood	Midland Railway Dudding Hill Line	Finchley Road

== See also ==
- Stations in West Hampstead
