= Broadhurst Gardens =

Street in Hampstead, London

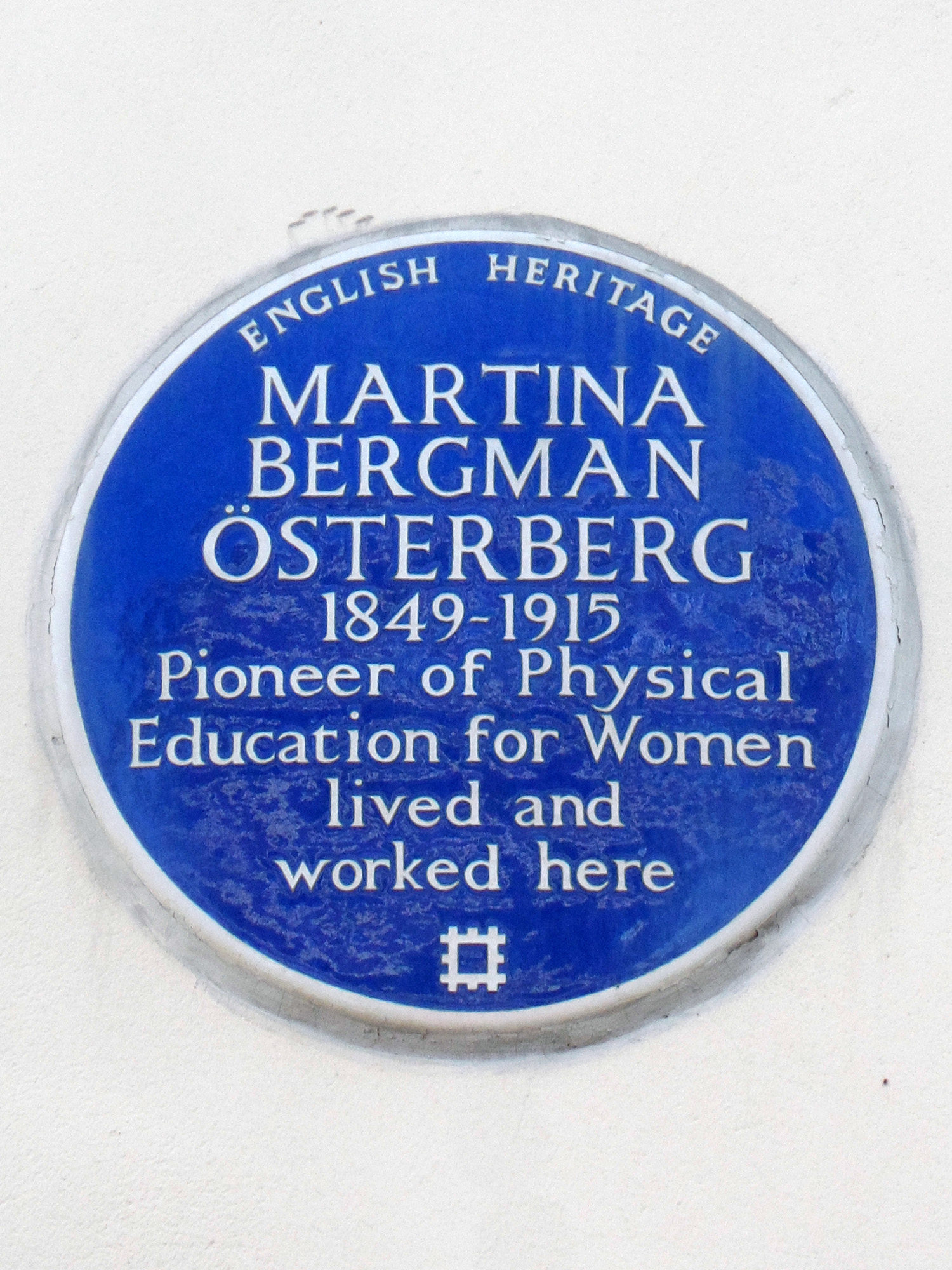
Blue plaque for Martina Bergman-Österberg.

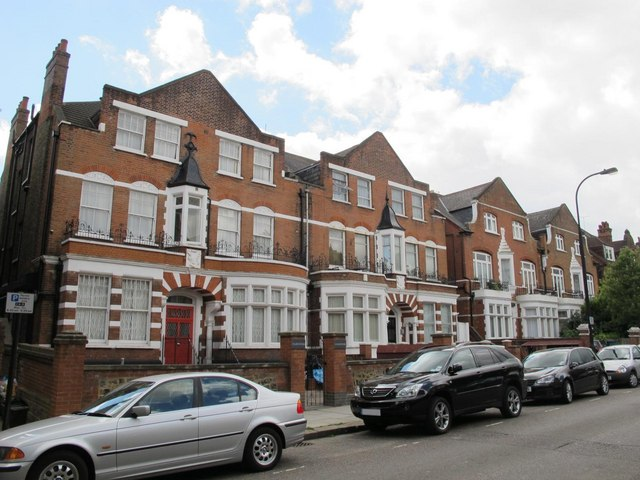
Houses featuring the red brick characteristic of the area.

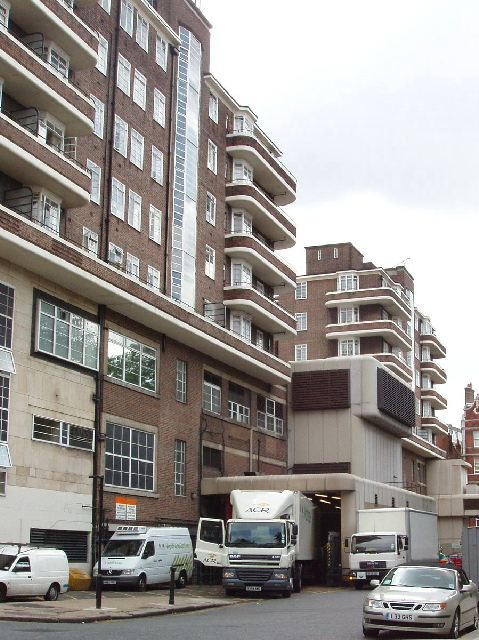
The rear of the St John's Court Art Deco apartments at the Finchley Road end of the street.

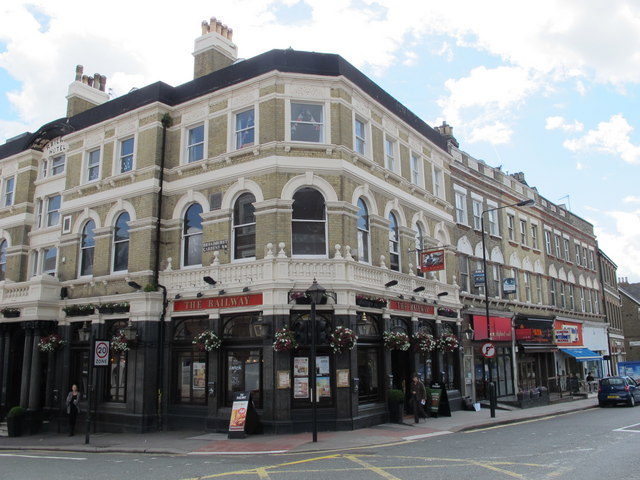
The Railway pub in 2011 at the West Hampstead end of the street.

Broadhurst Gardens is a street in the London Borough of Camden running eastwards from West End Lane in West Hampstead and ending near to the Finchley Road. It forms the northern border of South Hampstead, and runs parallel to the Midland Main Line. It meets or is crossed by Priory Road, Fairhazel Gardens and Canfield Gardens.

Construction began on the street in the 1870s and it was completed by 1887. It takes its name from an estate in Sussex belonging to the Maryon Wilson family like many other roads in the area developed during the era. It follows route of a much older pathway known as Gypsy Lane that linked the Kilburn and Belsize parts of Hampstead Parish. The northern side of the street was badly damaged by German bombing during the Second World War due to its proximity to the railway lines. The bomb sites were bought by the LCC in 1947 and redeveloped as flats.

The Decca Studios were located in the street from 1937 to 1981, based in a building that had previously been a factory and West Hampstead Town Hall which despite its name was primarily an entertainment venue. They were then sold off when Decca Records was acquired by Polygram. It was renamed Lilian Baylis House, and is now used as a rehearsal space by the English National Opera. The building is now Grade II listed.

The former residence of the physical education pioneer Martina Bergman-Österberg is now commemorated with a blue plaque. Other notable residents include the artists Walter Sickert, founder of the Camden Town Group, and John Henry Henshall. The Railway pub is at the western end, on the junction with West End Lane close to West Hampstead tube station. The shops at this end of an otherwise largely residential street are known as Broadwell Parade.

== See also ==
- Maresfield Gardens and Netherhall Gardens, nearby streets located on opposite side of Finchley Road

== Bibliography ==
- Bebbington, Gillian. London Street Names. Batsford, 1972.
- Baron, Wendy. Sickert: Paintings and Drawings. Yale University Press, 2006.
- Cherry, Bridget & Pevsner, Nikolaus. London 4: North. Yale University Press, 2002.
- Thompson, Francis Michael Longstreth. Hampstead; Building a Borough, 1650-1964. Routledge & Kegan Paul, 1974.
- Wade, Christopher (ed.) The Streets of West Hampstead. Camden History Society, 1992.
