= London Buses route 139 =

London bus route

139
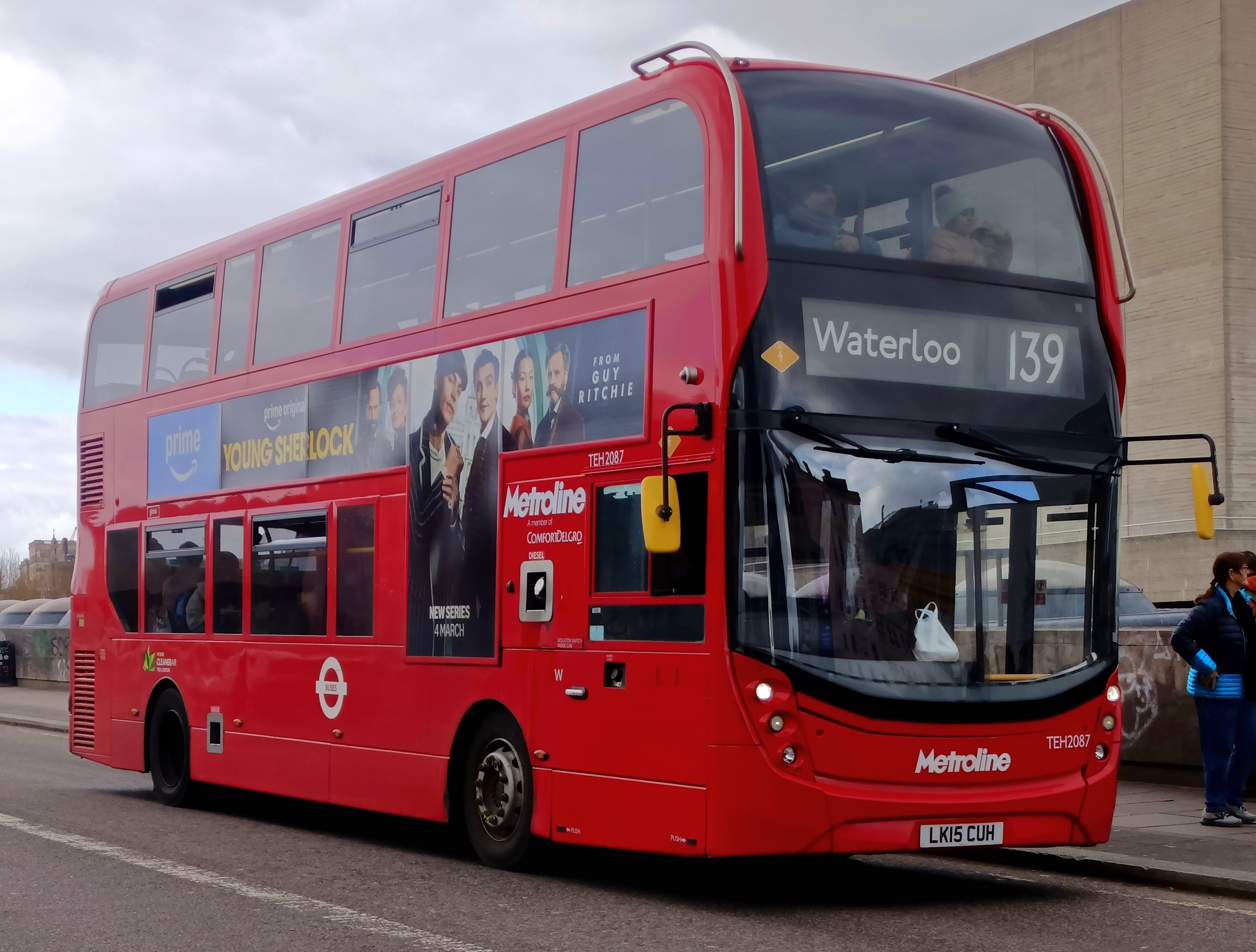
- Metroline Alexander Dennis Enviro400H MMC on Waterloo Bridge in March 2026

Overview
- Operator: Metroline
- Garage: Cricklewood
- Vehicles: Alexander Dennis Enviro400H MMC; Volvo B5LH Wright Eclipse Gemini 3
- Night-time: 24-hour service

Route
- Start: Golders Green station
- Via: West Hampstead; Abbey Road; Baker Street; Oxford Circus; Trafalgar Square; Aldwych
- End: Waterloo station

London Buses route 139 is a Transport for London contracted bus route in London, England. Running between Golders Green and Waterloo stations, it is operated by Metroline.

== History ==
In July 2016, Transport for London opened a public consultation on proposals for the route to be extended from West Hampstead to Golders Green as part of the Inner North West London Buses review. This took effect on 1 April 2017 with the route being extended to Golders Green and at the same was transferred from Metroline to London Sovereign.

When next tendered, the contract to operate the route was re-awarded to Metroline with the handover occurring on 29 August 2020.

On 21 November 2025, Transport for London launched a consultation proposing to reroute the route between Portman Square and Oxford Circus station via Wigmore Street instead of Oxford Street as part of plans to pedestrianise Oxford Street. In March 2026, it was confirmed that the changes would proceed and they were implemented on 25 October 2026.

== Current route ==
Route 139 operates via these primary locations:

- Golders Green station
- Childs Hill
- West Hampstead station
- Abbey Road
- St John's Wood
- Baker Street station
- Portman Square
- Wigmore Street
- Oxford Circus station
- Piccadilly Circus
- Trafalgar Square
- Charing Cross station
- Aldwych
- Waterloo station
