= Kingsbury =

Kingsbury may refer to:

== Places ==
=== United Kingdom ===
- Kingsbury, London, a district of northwest London in the borough of Brent
  - Kingsbury tube station, London Underground station
- Kingsbury, Warwickshire, a village and civil parish in Warwickshire, England
- Kingsbury Episcopi, village and civil parish in Somerset, England
- Kingsbury Regis, a hamlet in Milborne Port, Somerset, England
- Kingsbury Reservoir, old name for the Brent Reservoir in London
- Hundred of Kingsbury, a historical Hundred in the ceremonial county of Somerset, England
- Kingsbury, former name of Tyburn, a ward in Birmingham, England

=== Australia ===
- Kingsbury, Victoria, a suburb in Melbourne
- Kingsbury Tourist Drive, a scenic drive in Western Australia

=== Canada ===
- Kingsbury, Quebec, a village municipality in the Estrie region

=== Sri Lanka ===
- The Kingsbury, a hotel in Colombo

=== United States ===
- Kingsbury, Indiana, a town in Washington Township, LaPorte County
- Kingsbury, Nevada, a census-designated place in Douglas County
- Kingsbury, New York, a town in Washington County
- Kingsbury, Ohio, an unincorporated community in Meigs County
- Kingsbury, Texas, a city in Guadalupe County
- Kingsbury Auxiliary Airfield, an airport in San Joaquin County, California
- Kingsbury Brook, a tributary of Huntington Creek in Luzerne County, Pennsylvania
- Kingsbury County, South Dakota
- Kingsbury Creek, a stream in St. Louis County, Minnesota
- Kingsbury Fish and Wildlife Area, a protected area in LaPorte County, Indiana
- Kingsbury Grade, a state highway in Douglas County, Nevada
- Kingsbury Hall, a performing-arts center at the University of Utah, Salt Lake City, Utah
- Kingsbury House, a historic house in Newton, Massachusetts
- Kingsbury Place, a private place neighborhood in St. Louis, Missouri
- Kingsbury Plantation, Maine, a plantation in Piscataquis County
- Kingsbury Run, an area on the southeast side of Cleveland, Ohio

== People ==
- Kingsbury (band), an American indie rock band
- Kingsbury (surname) (including a list of people with the name)
- Albert Kingsbury, inventor of the hydrodynamic Kingsbury thrust bearing
- Aubrey Kingsbury, American soccer goalkeeper
- Mikaël Kingsbury, Canadian freestyle skier

== Other ==
- USS Kingsbury (APA-177)
- Kingsbury Aviation
- Kingsbury Commitment A 1913 AT&T agreement authored by Nathan Kingsbury with the United States government

== See also ==
- Kingsbury School (disambiguation)
- Kingsburg (disambiguation)
