= List of place names with royal styles in the United Kingdom =

The following list of place names with royal styles in the United Kingdom includes places granted a royal title or style by express grant from the Crown (usually by royal charter or letters patent) and those with a royal title or style based on historic usage.

== England ==
=== Royal ===
The following places have been explicitly granted or confirmed the use of the title "royal" by royal charter, letters patent or similar instrument issued by the monarch. Since 1926 the entitlement to the title "royal borough" has been strictly enforced. Devizes in Wiltshire, which had previously used the title without authorisation, was forced to end the practice.

Location	Type	Local government	Charters	Charter lapsed	Notes
Berkshire	Royal county	County council (1889–1998); 6 unitary authorities (1998–)	1957, 1974	—N/a	Location of Windsor Castle
Greenwich	Royal borough	London borough council	2012	—N/a	To mark the Diamond Jubilee of Elizabeth II. Location of the erstwhile Palace of Placentia, birthplace of Henry VIII, Mary I and Elizabeth I
Kensington	Royal borough	Metropolitan borough council	1901	1965	In memory of Queen Victoria, born at Kensington Palace
Kensington and Chelsea	Royal borough	London borough council	1965	—N/a	Transferred from Kensington
Kingston upon Thames	Royal borough	Municipal borough council in Surrey	Ancient prescriptive right, confirmed in 1927	1965	Coronation place of King Æthelstan in 924–925. Æthelstan described Kingston as royal town in a charter, as did Eadred later in the 10th century. In 1927 the mayor of Kingston upon Thames petitioned George V for the right to use the title of "royal borough". In reply to the petition the king declared that Kingston was entitled to the status, having been described as a royal borough since time immemorial.
Kingston upon Thames	Royal borough	London borough council	1965	—N/a	Transferred from municipal borough
Leamington Spa	"Royal" prefix	Civil parish with town council	1838, 1974, 2002	—N/a	Spa town established in late 18th century. The town received the title of "Royal Leamington Spa" in 1838 following a visit by Queen Victoria. Royal Leamington Spa was incorporated as a municipal borough in 1875, and on the borough's abolition in 1974 charter trustees were formed. The charter trustees were themselves abolished when a town council was formed in 2002.
Sutton Coldfield	Royal town	Historic town, now a civil parish within the City of Birmingham	1528	—N/a	Honour bestowed by Henry VIII
Tunbridge Wells	"Royal" prefix	Unparished area	1909, 1974	—N/a	Spa town, incorporated as a municipal borough in 1888. In 1909 Edward VII allowed the prefix "Royal" in recognition of the town's connections with the royal family since the Stuart dynasty. The Borough of Royal Tunbridge Wells was abolished in April 1974, and charter trustees were briefly appointed to preserve the mayoralty of the town. The trustees, who were themselves abolished in December 1974, obtained letters patent reauthorising the prefix "Royal" to the name of the town.
Windsor, also known as New Windsor	Royal borough	Municipal borough council	From reign of Henry I in early 12th century	1974	Location of Windsor Castle
Windsor and Maidenhead	Royal borough	Non-metropolitan district council (1974–1998); Unitary authority (1998–)	1974	—N/a	Transferred from Borough of Windsor
Wootton Bassett	"Royal" prefix	Civil parish with a town council	2011	—N/a	Repatriation of military personnel
Port of Barrow	"Royal" prefix	Port	2025	—N/a	Construction of warships and nuclear submarines for the Royal Navy

==== Former ====
- Royal Liberty of Havering – abolished in 1892.

=== Regis ===
Regis, Latin for "of the king", occurs in numerous placenames. This usually recalls the historical ownership of lands or manors by the Crown. The "Regis" form was often used in the past as an alternative form to "King's", for instance at King's Bromley and King's Lynn.

Examples include Houghton Regis in Bedfordshire, Salcombe Regis in Devon, Bere Regis, Melcombe Regis and Lyme Regis in Dorset, Milton Regis in Kent, Beeston Regis in Norfolk, Grafton Regis in Northamptonshire, Brompton Regis in Somerset, Newton Regis in Warwickshire and Rowley Regis in the West Midlands.

There is one modern example of the granting of the suffix "regis". In 1929, George V, having spent several months recuperating from a serious illness in the seaside resort of Bognor, West Sussex, allowed it to be renamed as "Bognor Regis".

=== King's ===
- Kingham
- Kingsbury
- Kingsclere
- King's Cliffe
- King's Cross
- King's Heath
- King’s Hill
- Kingskerswell
- Kings Langley
- King's Lynn
- King's Norton
- King's Sutton
- Kings Ripton
- Kings Tamerton
- Kings Worthy
- Kingstanding
- Kingsteignton
- Kingston by Ferring
- Kingston upon Hull
- Kingston upon Thames
- Kingswear
- Kingswinford
- Kingswood, Surrey
- Winterborne Kingston
- Kingsthorpe, Northampton

==== Somerset ====
- Kingsbridge
- Kingsbury Episcopi
- Kingsdon
- Kingston Bridge
- Kingston Seymour
- Kingston St Mary
- Kingstone
- Kingweston
- Kingswood

=== Queen's ===
- Queen Adelaide, Cambridgeshire
- Queenborough, Isle of Sheppey, Kent
- Queen Camel
- Queen Charlton
- Queen's Park, London
- Queensbury, London
- Queensbury, West Yorkshire
- Quendon

=== Prince's ===
- Princes Risborough
- Princetown

== Scotland ==
=== King and Rìgh ===
- Various places called Kingshouse
- Kingdom of Fife
- Kingskettle
- Dalrigh and possibly some of the places called Dalry
- Portree (disputed)

Kingsburgh, Skye is a corruption of Cinnseaborgh, which is in turn a corruption of a Norse name.

In many places "Kin(g)" is a suffix meaning "head", an anglicisation of Ceann: Kinghorn and Kingussie, for example, are nothing to do with royal patronage.

=== Regis ===
- Cramond, formerly referred to as Cramond Regis.

=== Queen ===
- North and South Queensferry
- Queen's Park, Edinburgh

=== Royal ===
- "Royal" Deeside – location of Balmoral Castle (unofficial but widely used)

==== Former royal burghs ====
In Scotland a royal burgh was a burgh or incorporated town founded by, or subsequently granted, a royal charter. By 1707, when the Act of Union with England and Wales came into effect, there were 70 royal burghs. None were created after 1707, and they were formally abolished in 1975. Notwithstanding their abolition, the term is still used in many of the former burghs.

== Wales ==
=== Royal ===
- Royal Town of Caernarfon. The status of royal borough was granted to then municipal borough of Caernarvon in August 1963. The borough was abolished in 1974 and replaced by the community of Caernarfon, to which the status of royal town was granted. Caernarfon was the site of the investiture of Charles, Prince of Wales.

=== King's ===
- Kingsland, Anglesey

=== Queen's ===
- Queensferry, Flintshire

== Northern Ireland ==
=== Royal ===
- Royal Hillsborough, County Down: On 1 June 2021 Brandon Lewis, the Secretary of State for Northern Ireland, announced that the prefix "Royal" would be granted to the exurban village. The local Lisburn and Castlereagh District Council had requested this in recognition of Hillsborough Castle, the official royal residence for Northern Ireland, as well as to mark the centenary of the creation of Northern Ireland. Letters Patent were issued and unveiled in October 2021 to effect this.

== See also ==
- Borough status in the United Kingdom
- Burgh
- City status in the United Kingdom
