= Kingsbury (surname) =

Kingsbury is a surname. Notable people and characters with the surname include:

- Albert Kingsbury (1863–1943), American engineer, inventor and entrepreneur
- Alison Mason Kingsbury (1898–1988), American artist
- Benedict Kingsbury (born 1961), scholar of international law and global governance
- Bobby Kingsbury (born 1980), American baseball player
- Bruce Kingsbury (1918–1942), Australian Victoria Cross recipient
- Clarence Kingsbury (1882–1949), British Olympic cyclist
- Cyrus Kingsbury (1786–1870), American Christian missionary
- Damien Kingsbury (born 1955), Australian academic
- Donald Kingsbury (born 1929), American–Canadian science fiction writer
- Edward M. Kingsbury (1854–1946), American journalist
- Emma L. Kingsbury (born 1987), Designer
- Fred Kingsbury (1927–2011), American Olympic rower
- Gina Kingsbury (born 1981), Canadian ice hockey player
- Gladys Kingsbury (1876–1958), American silent film actress and screenwriter
- Henry Kingsbury (born 1943), pianist and ethnomusicologist
- Howard Kingsbury (1904–1991), American Olympic rower
- Jack Dean Kingsbury (born 1934), American theologian
- Jacob Kingsbury (1756–1837), American army officer
- Jill Kingsbury, fictional character in the New Zealand soap opera Shortland Street
- John James Kingsbury (1853–1939), Australian politician and Crown Prosecutor
- Joseph C. Kingsbury (1812–1898), Mormon pioneer
- Joseph T. Kingsbury (1853–1937), American university president
- Karen Kingsbury (born 1963), American author
- Kathleen Kingsbury, American journalist and editor
- Kyle Kingsbury (born 1982), American mixed martial artist
- Kyle Kingsbury (character), fictional character in the 2007 novel Beastly by Alex Flinn
- Kliff Kingsbury (born 1979), American football player and coach
- Laurie Kingsbury (born 1992), Canadian ice hockey player
- Mathieu Kingsbury (born 1985), Canadian racing driver
- Mikaël Kingsbury (born 1992), Canadian skier
- Noel Kingsbury, British garden designer and writer
- Susan Myra Kingsbury (1870–1949), American economist and social researcher
- Thelma Kingsbury (born c. 1912 - 1979), English–American badminton player
- Tim Kingsbury (born 1977), Canadian musician
- Tom Kingsbury, American businessman
- William W. Kingsbury (1828–1892), American politician
