= Queensbury, London =

Area of north-west London, England

Coordinates: 51.591897°N 0.290767°W

Queensbury
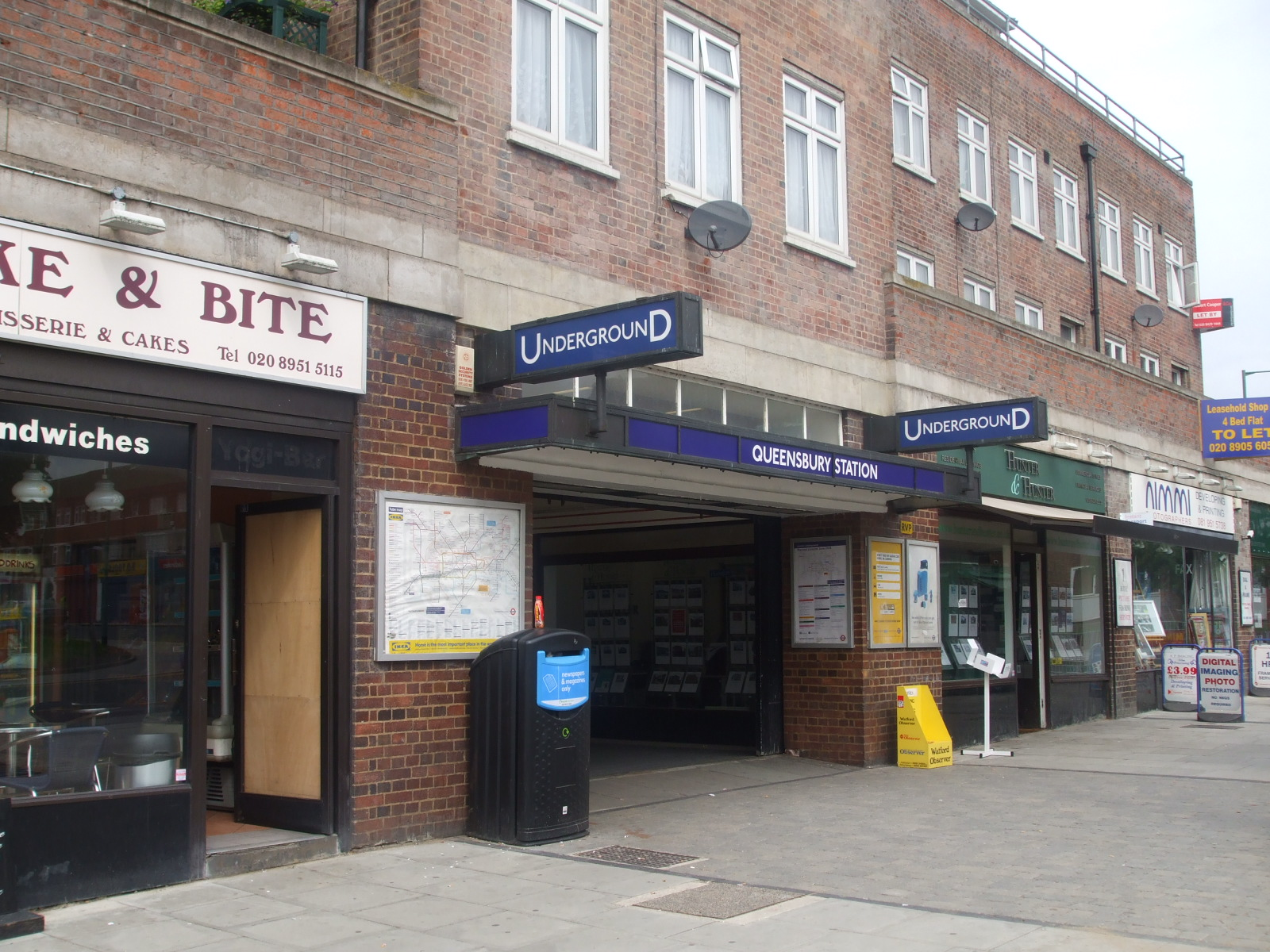
- Queensbury Station Parade

- Location within Greater London
- Population: 15,155 (2011 census, Brent ward)
- OS grid reference: TQ185895
- London borough: Harrow; Brent
- Ceremonial county: Greater London
- Region: London
- Country: England
- Sovereign state: United Kingdom
- Post town: HARROW, STANMORE, EDGWARE
- Postcode district: HA3, HA7, HA8
- Post town: LONDON
- Postcode district: NW9
- Dialling code: 020
- Police: Metropolitan
- Fire: London
- Ambulance: London
- UK Parliament: Brent East; Harrow East
- London Assembly: Brent and Harrow

Queensbury is an area in the south-east of the London Borough of Harrow, in north-west London, England; it lies on the boundary with the London Borough of Brent. The area is split between four postal districts: Harrow HA3, Stanmore HA7, Edgware HA8 and London NW9.

== History ==
The Queensbury suburb was built by Percy Harold Edwards (1886–1937); the name was chosen in a newspaper competition he inaugurated. From 1916, Queensbury was the site of the Stag Lane Aerodrome.

The main focus of Queensbury is the area around the tube station. Queensbury did not exist as an area before the opening of the Stanmore branch, as part of the Metropolitan line in 1932, which was transferred to the Bakerloo line in 1939, and then to the Jubilee line in 1979. The station opened on 16 December 1934. Its name was adopted for the tube station to match neighbouring Kingsbury and has no historical basis; it had been selected by way of a newspaper competition.

The parade of shops and houses built along with the station form a large crescent, with a public green space in the centre. The area was developed in the 1930s and the architecture reflects this. Until May 2008, a roundabout in front of the station featured a prominent 1930s-style mast, bearing the London Underground emblem. The pavements and public space were redeveloped at that time, losing some of the 1930s character.

== Geography ==
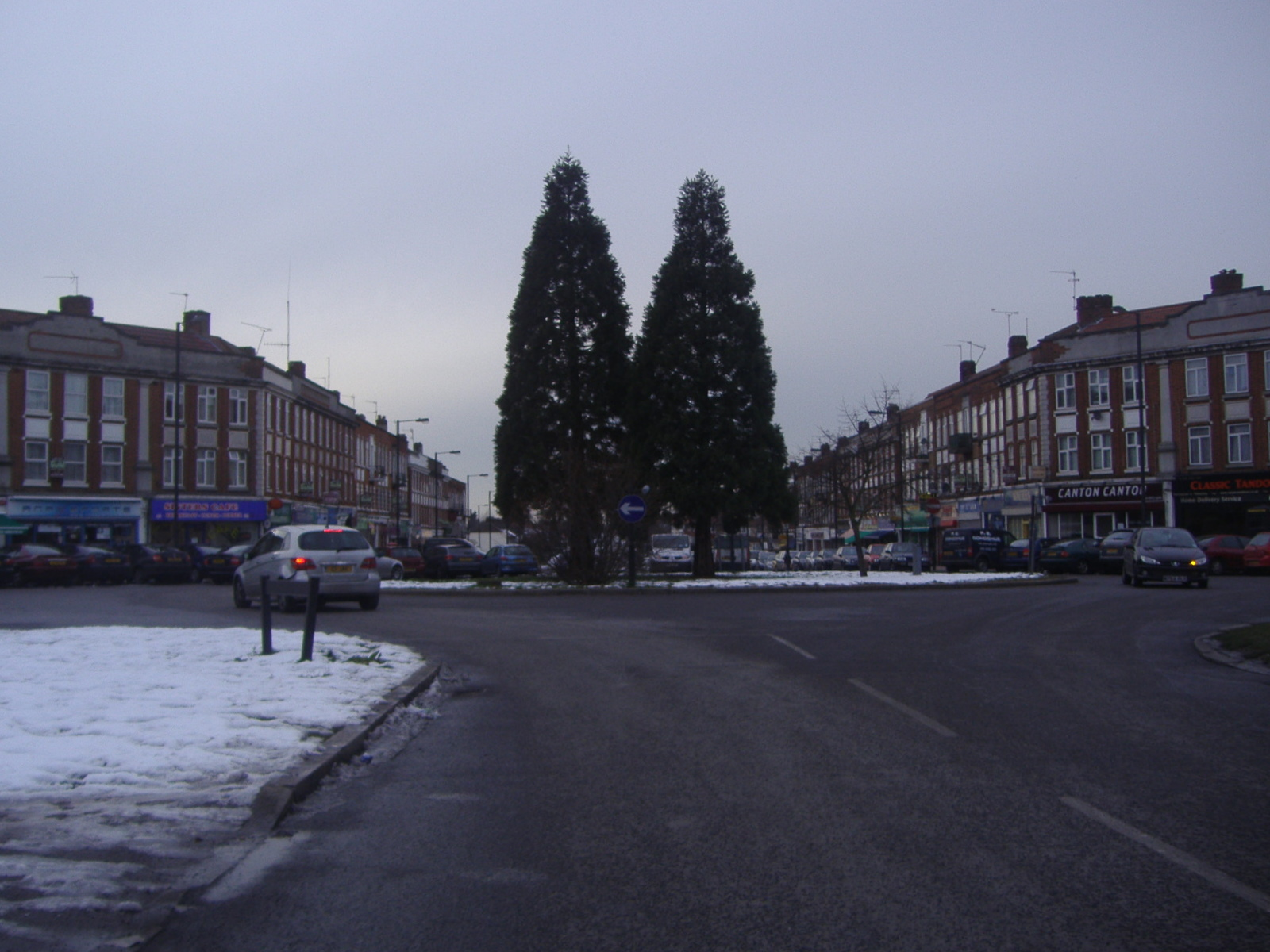
Mollison Way in Queensbury

The area around Queensbury Circle and Honeypot Lane is in the HA postcode area; the area south-east of Queensbury tube station is in the NW postcode area. It neighbours the district of Kingsbury, in the London Borough of Brent.

Queensbury Circle Parade is a roundabout and shops located north west of Queensbury station, along Honeypot Lane. A sub-post office is located here.

Nearby places:

- Burnt Oak
- Colindale
- Edgware
- Kenton
- Kingsbury
- Stanmore
- The Hyde

== Demographics ==
Queensbury is made up of two wards of its namesake in both London boroughs of Brent and Harrow, with a total population of 29,150, as of 2015. The area has a high ethnic diversity; as shown in the 2011 census, 72.9% of the population of Queensbury ward in Brent and 75% of Queensbury ward in Harrow were of minority background; the latter is the most diverse part of the borough of Harrow.

The census showed the largest ethnic group in the Queensbury ward of Harrow were Indians, who comprised 43.2% of the population. The next largest ethnic groups were Other Asian (14.7%) and White British people (13.3%).

In terms of religious affiliation, the Queensbury ward was 42% Hindu, 28% Christian and 14.3% Muslim in 2011.

== Transport ==
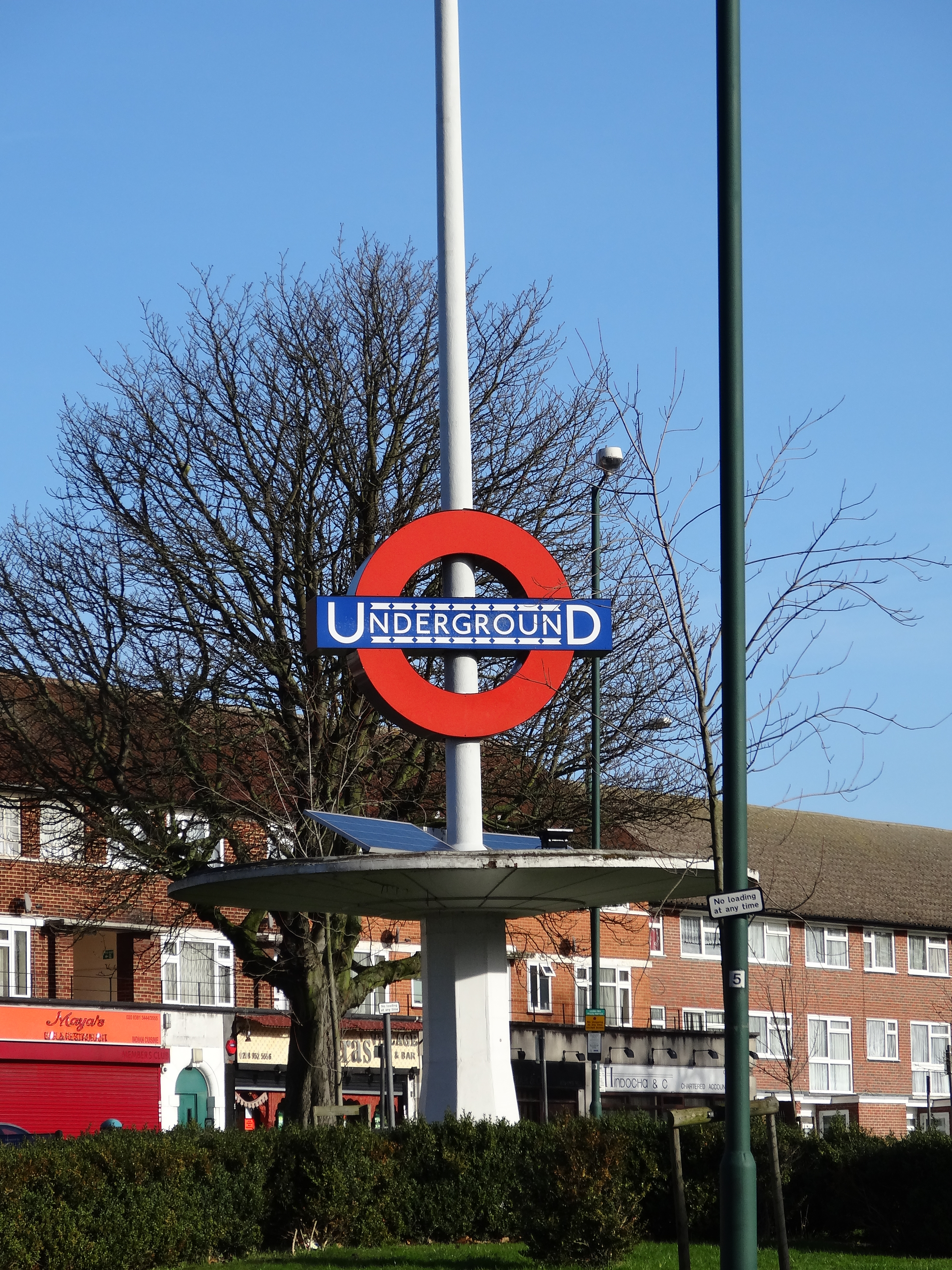
A classic London Underground roundel in the middle of the Queensbury Circle to indicate Queensbury station

Queensbury tube station lies on the Jubilee line of the London Underground, between Canons Park and Kingsbury. Regular services operate between Stanmore, Bond Street, Waterloo and Stratford.

London bus routes serving Queensbury are:

Route	Start	End	Operator
79	Alperton Sainsbury's	Edgware	London Sovereign
114	Mill Hill Broadway	Ruislip	Metroline
288	Queensbury Morrisons	Broadfields Estate	London Sovereign
324	Stanmore	Brent Cross Tesco	Metroline
606	Queensbury station	The Ravenscroft School	Metroline
N98	Stanmore	Holborn	Metroline
614 (non-TfL route)	Hatfield, via Barnet	Queensbury station	Uno
644 (non-TfL route)	Hatfield, via Borehamwood	Queensbury Station	Uno

== In popular culture ==
The tube station, with its local surroundings and characters, was cited in the song "Queensbury Station" by the Berlin-based punk-jazz band The Magoo Brothers, on their album Beyond Believable, released in 1988. The song was written by Paul Bonin and Melanie Hickford, who both grew up and lived in the area.
