= Queensbury tube station =

London Underground station

Queensbury
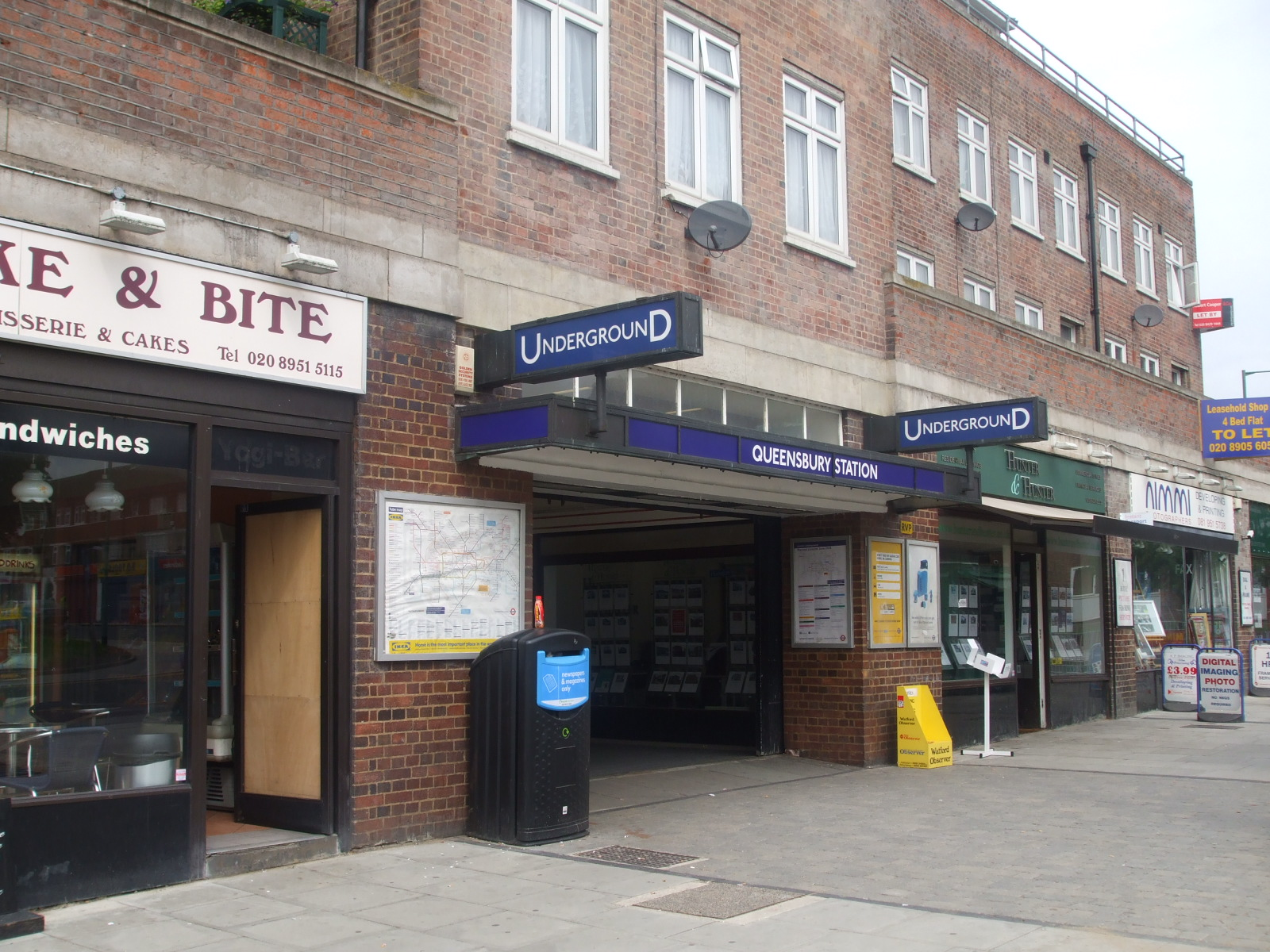
- Station entrance
- Interactive map of Queensbury

General information
- Location: Queensbury
- Local authority: Brent
- Managed by: London Underground
- Number of platforms: 2
- Fare zone: 4

London Underground annual entry and exit
- 2020: ▼2.86 million
- 2021: ▼1.84 million
- 2022: ▲3.07 million
- 2023: ▼3.06 million
- 2024: ▲3.15 million

Key dates
- 16 December 1934: Opened

Other information
- External links: TfL station info page
- Coordinates: 51.5942°N 0.2862°W

Queensbury is a London Underground station in Queensbury, north-west London. It is on the Jubilee line, between Canons Park and Kingsbury stations. It is in London fare zone 4.

== History ==
The station opened on 16 December 1934 on the Stanmore branch of the Metropolitan line, which was transferred to the Bakerloo line in 1939, and then to the Jubilee line in 1979.

The name Queensbury did not, when it was chosen, refer to any pre-existing area. It was coined by analogy with the adjacent Kingsbury station. Most of the locale now known as Queensbury is actually to the north-west of the tube station, in the London Borough of Harrow, just across the borough border from the tube station, which is in the London Borough of Brent.

== Connections ==
London Buses routes 79, 114, 288 and 324, night route N98 and non-TFL routes 614 and 644 serve the station.

== The Hive Stadium ==
Since 2013 and together with Canons Park station, Queensbury station is the next Tube station for "The Hive Stadium", the new football ground of Barnet FC, that is located 400 metres north along the railway tracks.

== Trivia ==
The station, and its local surroundings and characters were cited in the song "Queensbury Station" by the Berlin-based punk-jazz band The Magoo Brothers on their album "Beyond Believable", released on the Bouncing Corporation label in 1988. The song was written by Paul Bonin and Melanie Hickford, who both grew up and lived in the area.

Preceding station	London Underground	Following station
Canons Park towards Stanmore	Jubilee line	Kingsbury towards Stratford
Former services
Canons Park towards Stanmore	Metropolitan line Stanmore branch (1932–1939)	Kingsbury towards Baker Street or Aldgate
Canons Park towards Stanmore	Bakerloo line Stanmore branch (1939–1979)	Kingsbury towards Elephant & Castle
