= TCY =

TCY or tcy may refer to:

- Tai Choo Yee, a Malaysian YouTuber and journalist
- Tracy Municipal Airport (California) (FAA LID: TCY), California, United States
- Tulu language (ISO 639-3: tcy), a Dravidian language of India
