= Shreve City, Shreveport, Louisiana =

Coordinates: 32.466°N 93.706°W

Shreve City
- Neighborhood
- Shreve City as seen from Shreveport Barksdale Highway facing east towards the Red River
- Interactive map of Shreve City
- Country: United States
- States: Louisiana
- Parish: Caddo Parish
- City: Shreveport

Shreve City is the area of Shreveport located between the Shreveport-Barksdale bridge and East Kings highway. Shreve City currently houses the neighborhoods of Shreve Island, Broadmoor, and South Broadmoor; between these small neighborhoods is the newly remodeled Shreve City shopping city which includes a new Wal-Mart Super Center, Burlington Coat Factory and other small stores. The Shreve City area also contains a street named after Captain Shreve, after whom the city of Shreveport is also named. The Shreve City area is also a large gathering place for the Mardi Gras parades in Shreveport, running down the route of the Shreveport-Barksdale Highway.

== Neighborhoods Near Shreve City ==
Neighborhood
Anderson Island
Broadmoor
Shreve Island
