= KTCY =

KTCY may refer to:

- KTCY (FM), a radio station (105.3 FM) licensed to serve Menard, Texas, United States
- KYDA, a radio station (101.7 FM) licensed to serve Azle, Texas, which held the call sign KTCY from 2003 to 2013
- KZMP-FM, a radio station (104.9 FM) licensed to serve Pilot Point, Texas, which held the call sign KTCY from 1990 to 2003
- Tracy Municipal Airport (California) (ICAO code KTCY)
