= The Hive Stadium =

Football ground in London, England

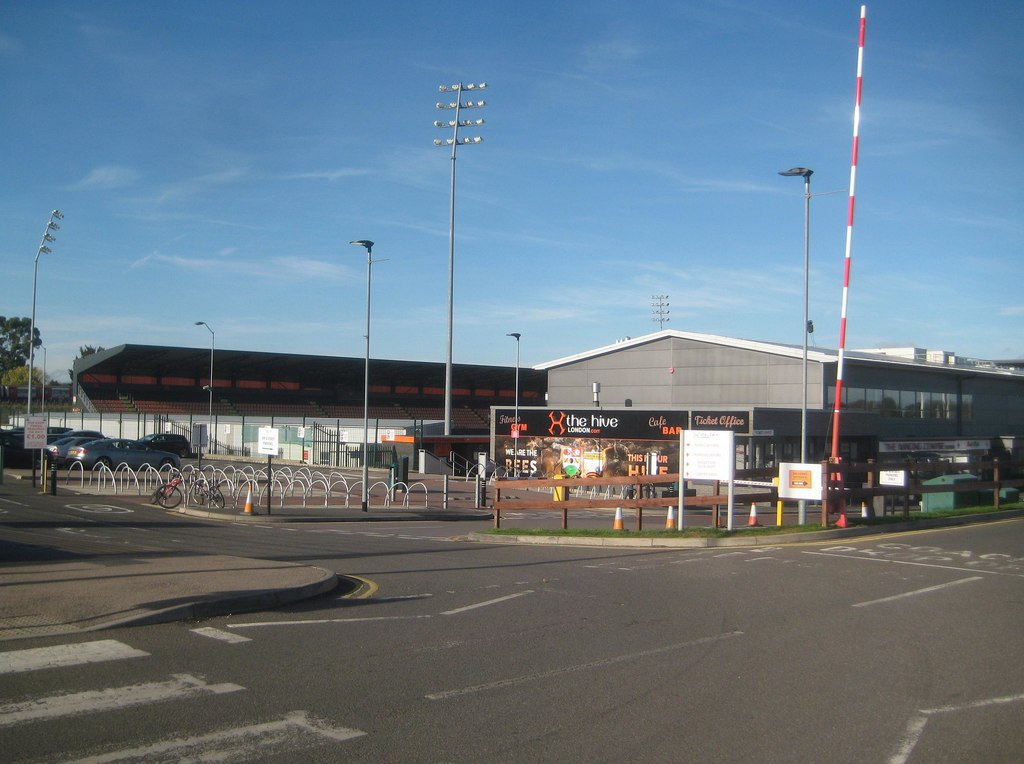
- The Hive Stadium in 2018
- Interactive map of The Hive Stadium
- Location: Edgware, London
- Coordinates: 51.6026°N 0.2918°W
- Owner: London Borough of Harrow (–2018); Barnet Football Club (2018–)
- Operator: Barnet Football Club
- Capacity: 6,500
- Surface: Grass
- Public transit: Canons Park

Construction
- Groundbreaking: 2003
- Opened: July 2013

Tenants
- Barnet Football Club (2013–present); London Broncos (2014–2015); London Bees (2014–present); Tottenham Hotspur F.C. Women (2019–2022)

Website
- www.thehivelondon.com

The Hive London is a football centre near Edgware, London, offering football pitches for hire, conference and banqueting facilities, an on-site gym, cafe, bar and more. It was built on the former site of the municipal Prince Edward Playing Fields in Canons Park in the London Borough of Harrow. The stadium is home to EFL League Two football club Barnet, London Bees of the FA Women's National League Division One South East, and formerly Tottenham Hotspur F.C. Women of the FA WSL from 2019 to 2022.

The stadium's official total capacity is 6,500 and its current record attendance is 6,215, set on 28 January 2019 for Barnet's 3–3 draw with Brentford.

== Background ==
Barnet chairman Anthony Kleanthous had sought to move the club from its long term home at Underhill Stadium since the 1990s due to the poor facilities at the ground. Various attempts to move to Barnet Copthall athletics stadium or to the greenbelt site directly to the south of Underhill were both unsuccessful, with then deputy prime minister John Prescott over-ruling a move to Copthall in 2001 after planning permission had initially been granted.

Construction of a stadium at the Harrow council-owned Prince Edward Playing Fields in Canons Park had originally begun in early 2003, specifically intended as a new home for local non-league club Wealdstone F.C. In April 2004, with the building work approximately 30% completed, Wealdstone F.C.'s investment partners in the project, a private company called Stadia Investment Group, went into liquidation and this caused the construction work at the site to be brought to a sudden halt due to a lack of funds to pay the builders. With Wealdstone F.C. unable to afford the completion of the project on their own, there was no further progress at the site for two years.

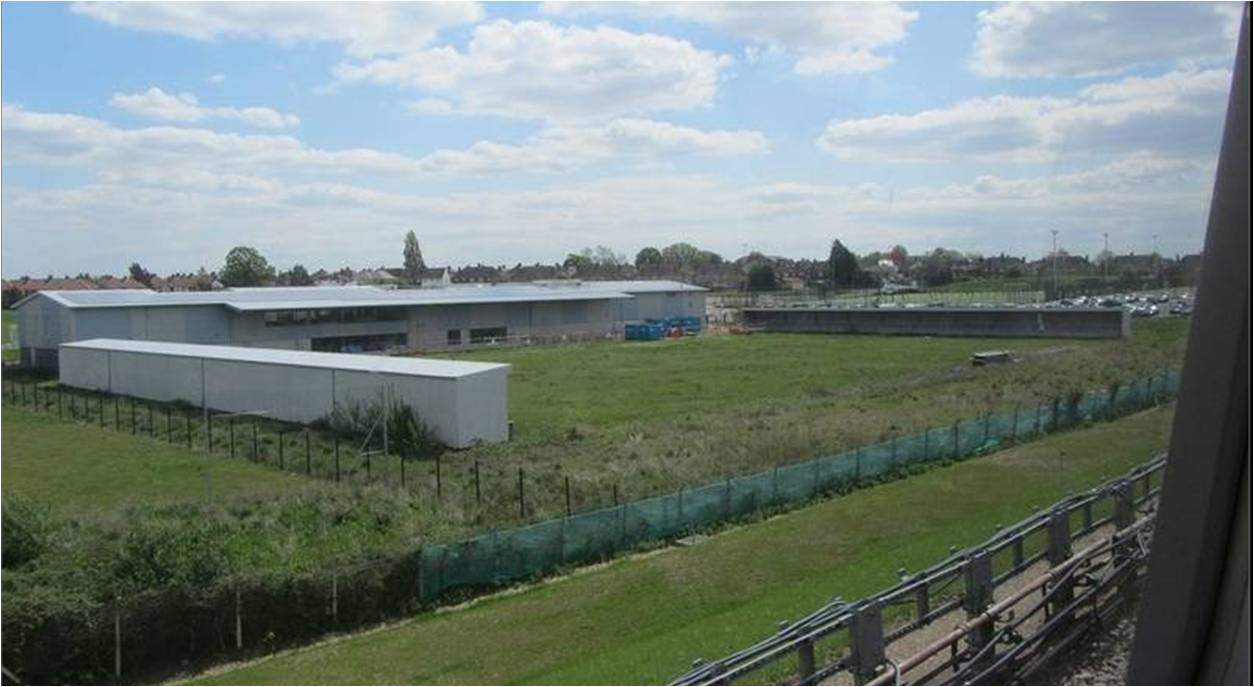
The partially built stadium in 2005

Harrow London Borough Council then decided to place the lease for the derelict site up for tender in 2006. Barnet F.C. bought the lease and with it the right to occupy the site, which they stated they would use purely as a training centre, and not as a new home stadium. It was a specific condition of Harrow Council's tender offer that the stadium must be completed by the new lease holders for the use of Wealdstone F.C., but this failed to happen and Wealdstone F.C. received no recompense for their initial investment into the ground.

Having used the surrounding site as a training centre for some years, Barnet F.C. eventually moved completely to the stadium in summer 2013, ostensibly as a result of a disagreement with Barnet London Borough Council with regards to the lease of the land surrounding their home since 1907, Underhill Stadium, as well as the limited facilities at Underhill restricting the club's income. The awarding of the Barnet Copthall site to Saracens F.C., effectively ended Barnet F.C.'s hopes of ever moving to that site, accelerating the move to the Hive further.

The club originally claimed they intended the use of the stadium at the Hive to be a temporary arrangement, with their long-term aim to build a 10,000-capacity stadium back in the London Borough of Barnet. However, that changed in 2015 with the chairman Kleanthous announcing the club would no longer actively search for a home elsewhere. Initially there was a restriction on the lease of the Hive that prevented its use for Football League matches, however Barnet F.C. were granted a 10-year change to this condition which came into effect in June 2015. In 2018 Kleanthous purchased the freehold for the site from the London Borough of Harrow and so this restriction no longer applies.

== The Hive ==
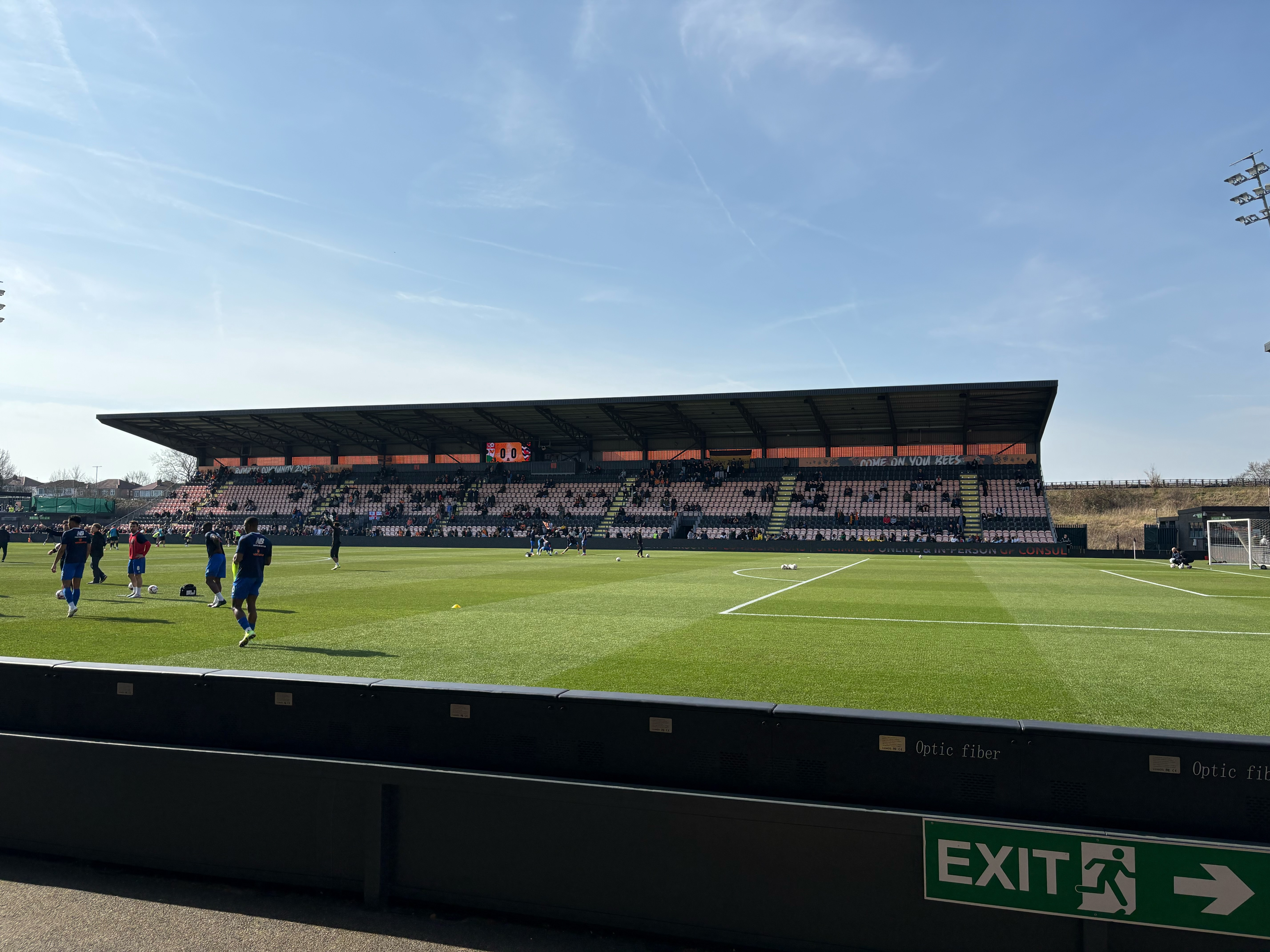
West Stand

A new training ground and centre of excellence for Barnet, which they named the Hive, was opened at the site by Trevor Brooking and the then England manager Fabio Capello in 2009. In the years following this, other facilities at the 44-acre site, including a banqueting suite, bar and lounge as well as a gym open to the public and also used by the club's players, were opened.

The club officially announced their intention to depart Underhill in December 2011, and confirmed that the 2012/13 season would be their last at the ground. In February 2013, the Football League ratified Barnet's move to the new stadium at the Hive.

The stadium has gradually been developed by Barnet F.C. since the decision to move there, initially with extra seating in the original East stand, and the construction of a new West stand with a capacity of 2,700 and two bars underneath. This was followed a couple of years later by a medical centre, a banqueting suite, and a new ticket office in the East stand, and in 2017 by a new 1,890 capacity North stand for away fans with a large bar underneath.

In June 2018, planning approval was granted for a major expansion of The Hive. This included revamping the East Stand and a new South Stand, which would have been similar to the North Stand. The stadium's capacity would have been increased to over 8,000. In February 2022 the old South Terrace was removed to make way for the new stand, but as of 2026, the new stand is yet to be built.

== London Broncos Rugby League ==
On 13 December 2013, it was confirmed that rugby league club London Broncos would move to the Hive for two seasons, commencing with the 2014 season. In round 2 of the 2014 Super League season Broncos played their first match at the Hive, against Salford Red Devils.

The record crowd for the Broncos in 2014 was against Super League giants Wigan Warriors where 2,013 were in attendance at the Hive.The Broncos left The Hive at the end of the 2015 season and moved to the Trailfinders Sports Ground in Ealing for 2016.

== Future ==
Some aspects of previous planned works are incomplete, a rear extension on the west stand is still expected to be built in the near future. On 6 November 2017 planning applications were submitted for the next phase of stadium development, which will bring capacity up to 8,500. Also an application for the development of additional on-site sporting facilities including full size covered pitch for the academy and a sports hall behind the North stand providing seven badminton courts and a basketball court with spectator seating .

== International matches ==
On 25 March 2015, the Hive hosted its first international fixture as England U20 drew 1–1 with Mexico U20.The Hive hosted Nigeria when they played against Senegal and Burkina Faso on 23 March 2017 and 27 March 2017, respectively. However the game against Burkina Faso was cancelled due to seven of the players being unable to acquire visas in time.

Due to its geographical proximity to Wembley Stadium, the Hive has been used as a base for several foreign international teams prior to playing against England, and was also selected as the venue to coordinate and coach the referees taking part in the 2012 Olympics football tournament.

On 28 March 2018 Nigeria played against Serbia in an international friendly, with Aleksandar Mitrovic scoring twice for Serbia in a 2–0 win.

=== Nigeria national football team ===
23 March 2017 Friendly	Nigeria	1–1	Senegal	London, England
	Iheanacho 83' (pen.)	Report	Sow 54'	Stadium: The Hive Stadium; Attendance: 2,013; Referee: Anthony Taylor (England)

27 March 2017 Friendly	Nigeria	Cancelled	Burkina Faso	London, England
		Report		Stadium: The Hive Stadium

27 March 2018 Friendly	Nigeria	0–2	Serbia	London, England
20:00 (GMT, UTC±0)		Report	Mitrović 68', 81'	Stadium: The Hive Stadium; Attendance: 3,500; Referee: Craig Pawson (England)

== Transport ==
Canons Park (400 metres (1,300 ft)) on the Jubilee line is the nearest tube station to the Hive. Journey times are approximately 25 minutes to Baker Street and 35 minutes to London Bridge. Queensbury tube station is a slightly longer distance away.

Edgware at the end of the Northern line is around 25 minutes walk away.

Bus routes 79, 186, 288 and 340 all serve the stadium.

== See also ==
- Development of stadiums in English football
