= O20 =

O20 or O-20 may refer to:

- HNLMS O 20, a submarine of the Royal Netherlands Navy
- Kingdon Airpark, in California, United States
- Otoyol 20, a motorway in Ankara, Turkey
- Oxygen-20, an isotope of oxygen
