= Her Younger Sister =

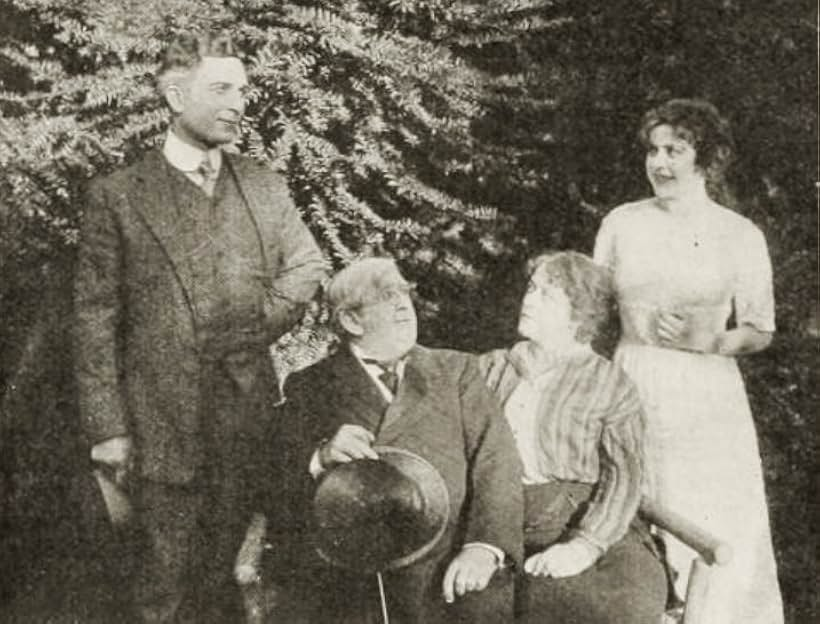
- Film still
- Directed by: Frank Cooley
- Written by: Mrs. Frank Cooley (story)
- Starring: Fred Gamble; Charlotte Burton
- Release date: December 15, 1914
- Country: United States
- Languages: Silent film English intertitles

Her Younger Sister is a 1914 American silent short drama film directed by Frank Cooley starring Fred Gamble and Charlotte Burton.

== Cast ==
- Fred Gamble as Billly Lyons
- Charlotte Burton as Elsie Lyons (age 20)
- Gladys Kingsbury as Emma Lyons
- Kathie Fisher as Elsie Lyons (age 10)
- Joseph Harris as John Wyman
