= Kingsburg =

Kingsburg can refer to:

- Kingsburg, California
- Kingsburg, Nova Scotia
- Kingsburg, South Dakota

== See also ==
- Kingsbury (disambiguation)
