= Stockton Metropolitan Airport =

Airport in San Joaquin County, California

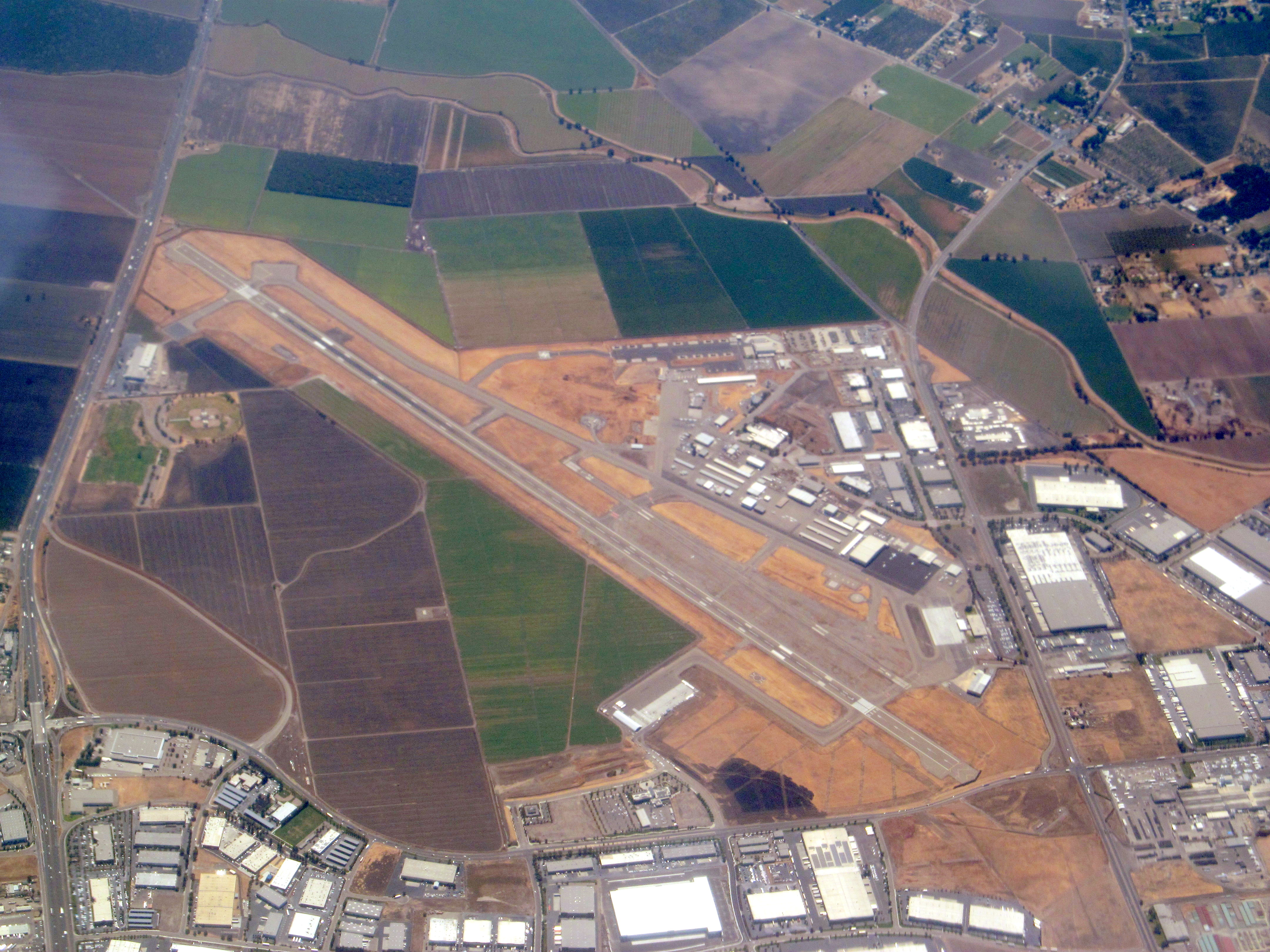
- Aerial view of the airport in 2017
- IATA: SCK; ICAO: KSCK; FAA LID: SCK; WMO: 72492

Summary
- Airport type: Public
- Owner: County of San Joaquin
- Serves: Stockton, California
- Location: San Joaquin County, California
- Time zone: PST (UTC−08:00)
  - Summer (DST): PDT (UTC−07:00)
- Elevation AMSL: 33 ft (10 m)
- Coordinates: 37°53′39″N 121°14′18″W
- Website: flystockton.com

Maps
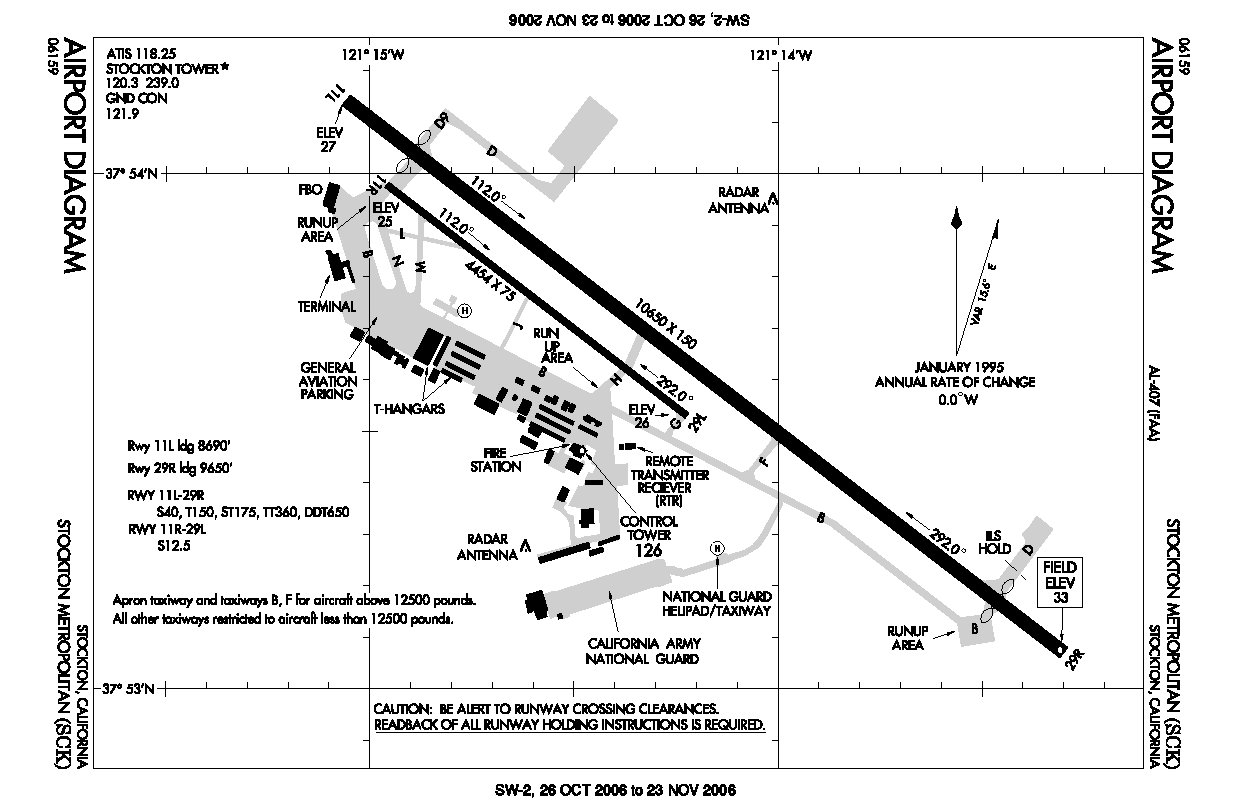
- FAA airport diagram
- Interactive map of Stockton Metropolitan Airport

Runways
Direction	Length		Surface
Direction	ft	m	Surface
11L/29R	10,245	3,123	Asphalt
11R/29L	4,448	1,356	Asphalt

Helipads
Number	Length		Surface
Number	ft	m	Surface
H1	70	21	Concrete

Statistics (2024)
- Aircraft operations: 59,352
- Total passengers: 127,000
- Source: Federal Aviation Administration

Stockton Metropolitan Airport (IATA: SCK, ICAO: KSCK, FAA LID: SCK) is a joint civil-military airport in unincorporated San Joaquin County, California, 3 miles (4.8 km) southeast of downtown Stockton. It is owned by the County of San Joaquin.

The National Plan of Integrated Airport Systems categorized it as a primary commercial service airport. Federal Aviation Administration records say it had 36,935 passenger boardings (enplanements) in calendar year 2008, 28,368 in 2009 and 50,632 in 2010.

== History ==
In the months preceding World War II, the U.S. Army entered into the first of many lease agreements with the City of Stockton (on August 15, 1940) to build and operate an Army training facility at Stockton Municipal Airport.

=== World War II ===
Stockton Army Airfield was initially garrisoned by the 68th Air Base Group (Special) under the Air Corps Advanced Flying School. Between 1940 and 1945, Stockton Field served as a training installation under the West Coast Training Center (later Western Flying Training Command) headquartered at Santa Ana Army Air Base. Known sub-bases and auxiliaries of Stockton AAF were:

- Kingsbury Auxiliary Airfield (No 1) 38°05′31″N 121°21′32″W
- New Jerusalem Auxiliary Airfield (No 2) 37°40′43″N 121°17′58″W
- Modesto Auxiliary Airfield (No 3)n37°37′34″N 120°57′21″W
- Tracy Auxiliary Airfield (No 4) 37°41′19″N 121°26′26″W
- Franklin Auxiliary Airfield (No 5) 38°18′19″N 121°25′45″W

In May 1944 all of the facility was consolidated into the 3033rd Army Air Forces Base Unit. Given the airfield's proximity to logistical facilities under the Army Air Forces and Army Service Forces, the site soon became a logistical hub for the U.S. Army in general and the Army Air Forces in particular. This resulted in an increased number of transport aircraft passing through Stockton Field. Military warehouse facilities included 46 miles (74 km) of tracks connected to the adjacent Southern Pacific and Western Pacific Railroads for delivery and distribution of a daily average of 200 railcars of military supplies.

On March 2, 1945, the final class completed training and Stockton AAF was transferred from the control of the Western Flying Training Command to the Air Transport Command. With this transfer, the 3033rd AAFBU was redesignated as the 591st AAFBU.

=== Postwar use ===
In October 1946 Stockton AAF was declared surplus. As 1,044.18 acres were in the process of being transferred to the War Assets Administration for disposal, 71.36 acres, consisting of a major portion of the former cantonment area including housing, storage facilities, and a sewage disposal plant, were leased to U.S. Army's Stockton General Depot located to the south in nearby Lathrop.

The City of Stockton and the County of San Joaquin resumed operating the former Stockton Municipal Airport on December 16, 1946, under a joint (interim) license. On the 1,044.18 acres of leased land (950 acres of which comprise the airport now under license) there were approximately 175 buildings, including 50 airport-related structures which were included in the above described license. The buildings were primarily the Quartermaster 700-series and 800-series type construction with concrete foundations, wood floor, composition roof, and wood lap siding.

=== United States Army use ===
On January 29, 1947, the 71.36-acres of former Stockton Field retained by the U.S. Army was officially named the Stockton General Depot Field Annex, then renamed Sharpe General Depot Field Annex in 1948, when Stockton General Depot was redesignated as Sharpe General Depot. The U.S. Army, with the exception of the Sharpe General Depot Field Annex, left Stockton Field by January 31, 1948; the same date that the City of Stockton and the County of San Joaquin jointly assumed administration over the airport (Stockton Record 1964).

=== Korean War use ===
Sharpe General Depot Field Annex was formed from two parcels of land adjacent to the southwest portion of the current Stockton Metropolitan Airport. Sharpe General Depot Field Annex was operated by the U.S. Army as a separate, self-contained military post under Sharpe General Depot. With the rapid expansion of depot operations and facilities that occurred with the outbreak of the Korean War in June 1950, Sharpe General Depot Field Annex's name was changed to Sharpe General Depot Troop Field Annex to reflect its support mission. During this period, the site was used primarily for family housing, recreational, and other support facilities for Sharpe General Depot. One of the tenants was the 164th Field Artillery Battalion of the California Army National Guard, who occupied a small part of the Sharpe General Depot Troop Field Annex until a new National Guard Armory was built on State-owned land south of the site in 1952.

=== Sixth Army & Army Material Command use ===
On July 8, 1957, the City of Stockton transferred half of its interest in the Stockton Municipal Airport by Grant Deed, and San Joaquin County assumed administration over the airport (subject to certain reservations, restrictions and conditions according to the "Agreement" with the United States of America dated December 23, 1948 (Appendix A)).

The end of the Korean War caused more mission changes at Sharpe General Depot and the Sharpe General Depot Troop Field Annex. Sharpe was selected as a location for Cold War storage of surplus military diesel locomotives. After application of lubricant preservatives, each locomotive was placed within an individual cocoon protected by an electrically operated, automatically controlled dehumidifying system. In 1958, the Sharpe General Depot received a Fourth Echelon Air Maintenance Support mission on U.S. Army aircraft within the Sixth U.S. Army Area. The Site then served as home to the Sixth U.S. Army Aircraft Field Maintenance Activity operated by Detachment 3, 6932nd Service Unit. This unit provided maintenance support to U.S. Army rotary and fixed-wing liaison aircraft in the Sixth U.S. Army area and occupied Buildings 1000, 1001, and 1003. The site also was the home of the 30th Engineer Group (Topographic) and the 521st Engineer Company (Topographic, Aviation). During 1959 and 1960, construction of a new airstrip, hangar and shop at Sharpe Army Depot curtailed the military's use of Stockton Airport. In June 1961, the Aircraft Field Maintenance Activity was transferred to Fort Ord, California. By July 1962, the Army Material Command was established with several sub-commands, including the Supply and Maintenance Command. This brought about another name change when Sharpe General Deport became Sharpe Army Depot Field Annex.

=== Vietnam War use ===
On July 11, 1964, Stockton Municipal Airport was officially renamed the Stockton Metropolitan Airport, reflecting its changing role as a civil airport. Thirty new military family housing units were also built in 1964 at Sharpe Army Depot Field Annex, resulting in the closure of older family housing units at the site.

In the last months of 1965, support to Army Aviation expanded again as a result of the U.S. Army's role in Southeast Asia. As the Vietnam War continued, so did Sharpe Army Depot Field Annex's mission. Sharpe became the Army Material Command's key west coast installation and the Army's chief provider of supplies for United States military personnel in Vietnam. Cocoons were removed from fourteen of the stockpiled diesel locomotives. Twelve of the locomotives were sent to other military bases while two remained at Sharpe to accept delivery and expedite distribution of a daily average of thirty carloads of military supplies. Rail movements represented approximately 38 percent of all freight handled at the base. In April 1966, the first units of the Headquarters and Headquarters Company, 56th Quartermaster Depot began to arrive at the Site, followed by units of the Headquarters and Headquarters Company, 58th Field Depot in July.

By 1967, the Headquarters Commandant of the Sharpe Army Depot Field Annex had the responsibility to command troops assigned to Sharpe Army Depot Field Annex. This included the supervision of all attached and tenant units, Special Services, Annex Services, Education Center, Officers Open Mess and Non-commissioned Officers Club, including support for Army Reserve, Army National Guard and transient units.

In January 1966, an Army clothing store was transferred from Sacramento Army Depot and reopened in Building T-88 at the Site. An AAFES Branch Exchange of the Presidio of San Francisco was also established in Building T-137. On-post housing at Sharpe Army Depot Field Annex was limited, causing 44 sets of "inadequate quarters" to be established at the site, whereby old barracks buildings were converted into "apartment-type quarters" with two apartments upstairs and two downstairs. To further accommodate the increase in soldiers now stationed at Sharpe Army Depot Field Annex, the site now provided many additional services such as laundry, dry cleaning, and medical facilities.

In the early 1970s, the need for soldiers garrisoning Sharpe Army Depot Field Annex decreased as military positions were converted to Department of the Army Civil Service positions. Due to the shift in staffing, Sharpe Army Depot determined that it no longer required the Field Annex site and began the process of disposing of the Sharpe Army Depot Field Annex.

=== Deactivation (Regular Army) ===
Sharpe Army Depot Field Annex was vacated in 1973, ending the U.S. Army's presence on the field with all of the land and buildings reverting to San Joaquin County. A few original World War II structures still remain including the American Legion Sharpe General Depot Post 632 currently occupying a World War II era mess hall on the Sharpe Army Depot Field Annex property located at Building 372, 1700 Northrop Street.

=== Military facilities and activities ===
Although the active duty Regular Army departed the airport location following the closure of the Sharpe Army Depot Field Annex, the airport continues to retain a military presence in the form of both ground and Army Aviation activities of the California Army National Guard. These facilities include a National Guard Armory, Field and Combined Support Maintenance Shops, and an Army Aviation Support Facility (AASF) just south of the former Field Annex site. The Army National Guard aviation presence accounts for the airports continued designation as a joint civil-military airport. The main aviation units at the airport are Headquarters and Headquarters Company and Company A of the 3rd Battalion, 140th Aviation Regiment, operating the CH-47 Chinook and the UH-72 Lakota.

=== Civil use: airline service ===
United Airlines served Stockton from 1946 until 1980; it had Stockton's first jet flights, in late 1968.

Pacific Southwest Airlines (PSA) and successor USAir operated from 1971–72 to 1980 and from 1984 to 1991.

The original Frontier Airlines, followed by Continental Airlines, flew from Stockton to Denver Stapleton International Airport from 1980 to 1988.

Southwest Airways and successors Pacific Air Lines, Air West and Hughes Airwest, served Stockton from 1955 until about January 1979.

Commuter turboprop airline flights ended in 1995. America West Express, the regional affiliate of America West Airlines, started Canadair CRJ-200 flights to Phoenix Sky Harbor International Airport in 2000, but dropped them in 2001 and vacated the terminal in 2003.

=== Past jet service ===
Past passenger jet service include United Airlines, which operated Boeing 727-200s and 737-200s.

Before its merger with USAir, PSA flew Boeing 727-100s, 727-200s, 737-200s, McDonnell Douglas DC-9-30s and BAe 146-200s.

Before its acquisition by Republic Airlines, Hughes Airwest operated McDonnell Douglas DC-9-30s.

USAir flew BAe 146-200s after its acquisition of PSA.

Continental Airlines (before its merger with United Airlines) and Frontier Airlines operated Boeing 737-200s and 737-300s.

Pacific Express flew BAC One-Elevens.

=== Flights to Mexico ===
Aeromexico had expressed interest in starting service in 2006 to Guadalajara and Morelia, but the airport was unable to secure a customs facility. Federal officials saw no need for such facility as they already existed in larger airports like Sacramento, Oakland, Fresno, San Francisco and San Jose with global capabilities.

Local officials filed an appeal and Congressman Richard Pombo also persuaded officials to approve a facility. Federal officials then reconsidered and approved the plans. Despite the approval, San Joaquin County Supervisors decided against financing the project

In June 2015, the airport was seeking funding for construction of a temporary customs inspection station at the airport, to allow for possible service on Mexican airlines Volaris and Aeromexico.

== Current ==
=== Allegiant Air jet service ===
In June 2006 Allegiant Air began round trip non-stop flights to Las Vegas and this service continues at the present time.

On October 26, 2007, Allegiant Air began flights to Phoenix–Mesa and on July 1, 2010, to Long Beach; however, both routes were then discontinued.

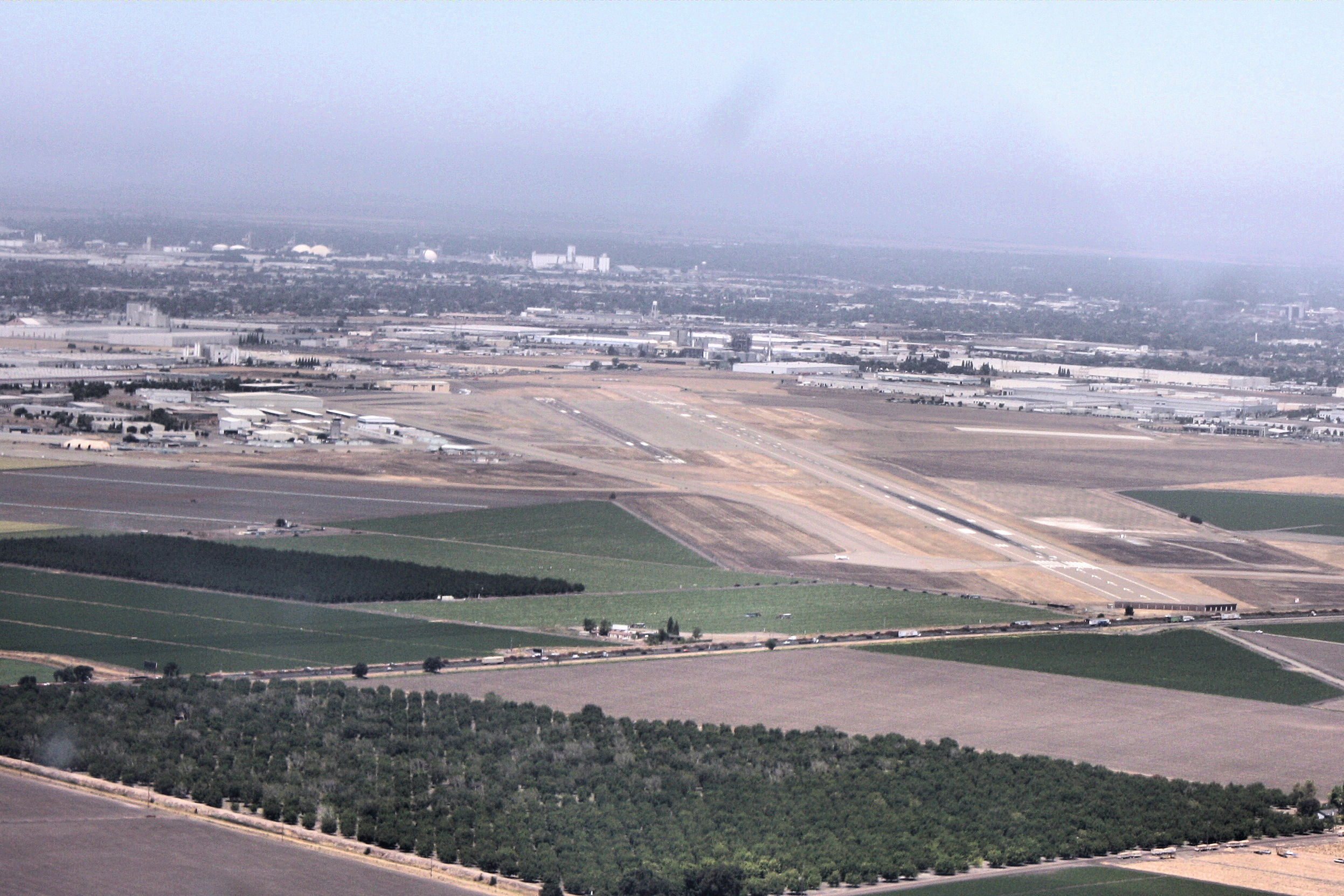
July 2009 oblique photo

On October 28, 2011, Allegiant Air began twice weekly MD-80 flights from Stockton to Palm Springs but then discontinued this service as well.

On November 18, 2012, Allegiant Air began flying twice weekly Boeing 757-200 nonstop flights from Stockton to Honolulu. This service has since been cancelled. The Boeing 757 was the largest aircraft ever to serve the airport with scheduled passenger flights.

Allegiant Air flies one or two flights on average per day to Las Vegas. Allegiant also offers twice weekly flights to Phoenix Sky-Harbor International Airport.

Allegiant had once offered non-stop service to Phoenix–Mesa with two weekly flights on Sundays and Thursdays, with San Diego on a seasonal basis, but has since discontinued both routes.

Load factors for Allegiant are reported to be about 90 percent for their flights from Stockton.

=== Cooperation agreement with Chengdu Shuangliu International Airport ===
In August 2015, airport officials signed a statement with visiting counterparts from Chengdu Shuangliu Airport, promising "strategic cooperation" between the two airports. The agreement mentions the possibility of air services between the two airports, but no such services currently exist or are planned.

=== Cargo flights ===
In February 2016, Amazon.com began daily chartered air cargo flights into Stockton Metropolitan Airport as part of their Project Aerosmith, a project by Amazon.com to test the idea of starting their own air cargo operation. The flight is operated daily to Airborne Airpark by Air Transport International on behalf of Amazon, now known as Prime Air utilizing a Boeing 767-300 aircraft. The trial flights from Wilmington, OH were originally operated into Oakland International Airport at the start of Project Aerosmith, but soon after operations were shifted over to Stockton airport.

As of October 2, 2017, there were two daily flights operating from Cincinnati/Northern Kentucky International Airport with one continuing on to Ontario International Airport while the second returns to Cincinnati. These aircraft are both leased and operated by Atlas Air.

=== General aviation ===
Atlantic Aviation is the sole fixed-base operator for general aviation services at Stockton Airport. Atlantic provides both Jet-A and Avgas for the entire airport – including Amazon Air and Allegiant, as well as leased hangar space.

=== United Express ===
On August 16, 2019, United Express began service to LAX, where travelers were able to connect to other United destinations, as well as destinations served by other Star Alliance air carriers. There were two daily flights using a Bombardier CRJ-200 operated by SkyWest from SCK. This service was discontinued in early 2020 due to the COVID-19 pandemic.

=== Stockton Field Aviation Museum ===
Stockton Metropolitan Airport is home to the Stockton Field Aviation Museum, a non-profit organization dedicated to preserving Stockton's rich aviation history. The museum has a special emphasis on WWII aviation and the equipment that was used by the people who designed, built, maintained and flew the aircraft of America's Greatest Generation. The museum hosts an annual Bomber Camp fundraiser, which allows participants to fly in WWII bombers (B-17 and B-24) and drop concrete bombs from the air to a ground target.

== Facilities ==
The airport covers 1,552 acres (628 ha) at an elevation of 33 feet (10 m). It has two asphalt runways: 11L/29R is 10,245 by 150 feet (3,123 x 46 m) and 11R/29L is 4,448 by 75 feet (1,356 x 23 m). It has one concrete helipad, H1, 70 by 70 feet (21 x 21 m).

The airport also has a 44,355 sq. ft. terminal building, capable of holding almost 400 passengers in its hold room, as well as up to five aircraft at a time once upgrades of the apron are complete. The airport is also seeking to add customs facilities to attract new international flights to Mexico.

In the year ending April 30, 2019, the airport had 82,714 aircraft operations, average 226 per day: 92% general aviation, 3% military, 2% air taxi, and 3% airline. 180 aircraft were then based at this airport: 120 single-engine, 20 military, 16 multi-engine, 20 jet, three helicopter, and one ultralight.

== Airlines and destinations ==
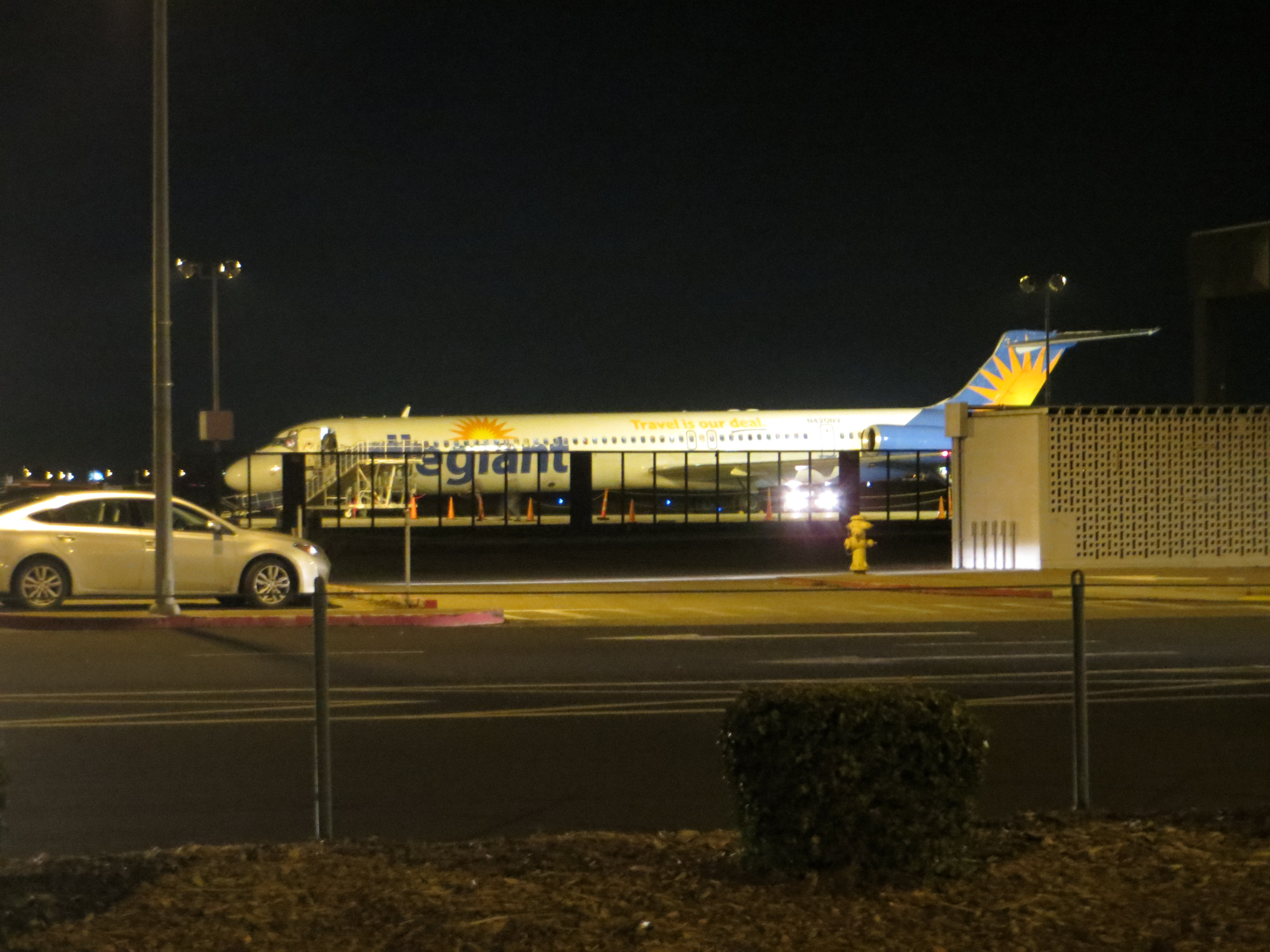
An Allegiant Air MD-82 awaiting departure to Las Vegas

=== Passenger ===
Airlines	Destinations	Refs.
Allegiant Air	Las Vegas, Phoenix–Sky Harbor	

=== Destinations map ===
Destinations map
Continental U.S. destinations from Stockton Metropolitan Airport
Red = Year-round destination
Green = Seasonal destination
Blue = Future destination

=== Cargo ===
Airlines	Destinations
Amazon Air	Chicago/Rockford, Cincinnati, Ontario, Tampa

== Statistics ==
=== Top destinations ===
Busiest domestic routes from SCK (January 2025 – December 2025)
Rank	City	Passengers	Carriers
1	Las Vegas, Nevada	47,130	Allegiant
2	Phoenix, Arizona	16,670	Allegiant
3	Denver, Colorado	2,550	Allegiant

== Ground transportation ==
The airport is located south of Downtown Stockton, between Interstate 5 and Highway 99. Motorists are instructed to take Arch Airport Road from either of those two freeways to South Airport Way, then head south to the intersection of South Airport Way and C.E. Dixon Street, and then turn east to the airport entrance at C.E. Dixon and Longe Streets.

Daytime parking is free while overnight parking is charged a fee. The airport is also served by Lyft and taxi companies.

As of January 2020, San Joaquin Regional Transit District buses do not directly serve the airport (the closest line, Express Route 44, only reaches Arch Airport Road from downtown).

== See also ==
- California World War II Army Airfields
- 35th Flying Training Wing (World War II)
