= Tom Kingsbury =

American business executive

Thomas A. Kingsbury (born 1952) is an American businessman and executive. He is a former Chief Executive Officer at Burlington Stores, Inc. and Kohl's.

== Early and personal life ==
Kingsbury obtained his bachelor's degree from the University of Wisconsin-Madison. His daughter is journalist Kathleen Kingsbury.

== Career ==
Kingsbury was Chief Executive Officer and President of Burlington Stores, Inc. from 2008 to 2018. Kingsbury was appointed Chairman of the Board of Burlington Stores, Inc. in May 2014. Prior to joining Burlington Stores, Inc., he served as Senior Executive Vice President- Information Services, E- Commerce, Marketing and Business Development of Kohl's Corporation from August 2006 to December 2008. Kingsbury had also served in various management positions with The May Department Stores Company, an operator of department store chains, commencing in 1976 and as President and Chief Executive Officer of the Filene's division since February 2000.

In Dec. 2022, Kingsbury, who had been on the Kohl's board since 2021, was appointed interim CEO, before taking over permanently in 2023. In January 2025, Kingsbury stepped down as CEO of Kohl's, but retained in an executive advisory role for new CEO Ashley Buchanan. He was on the Kohl's Board until his retirement in May 2025.
