= Kingshouse =

Kingshouse may refer to:

- Kingshouse, a hamlet in Stirling council area, formerly served by the Kingshouse railway station, which opened 1871 and closed 1965
- Kings House Hotel in Glen Coe, built in the 17th century
- King's House, Winchester, a late 17th-century planned royal palace in the English county of Hampshire, started 1683, structurally completed but never finished, gutted by fire in 1894 and demolished
- King's House School, an independent day preparatory school in Richmond, London, founded in 1947
