= London Buses route 324 =

London bus route

324
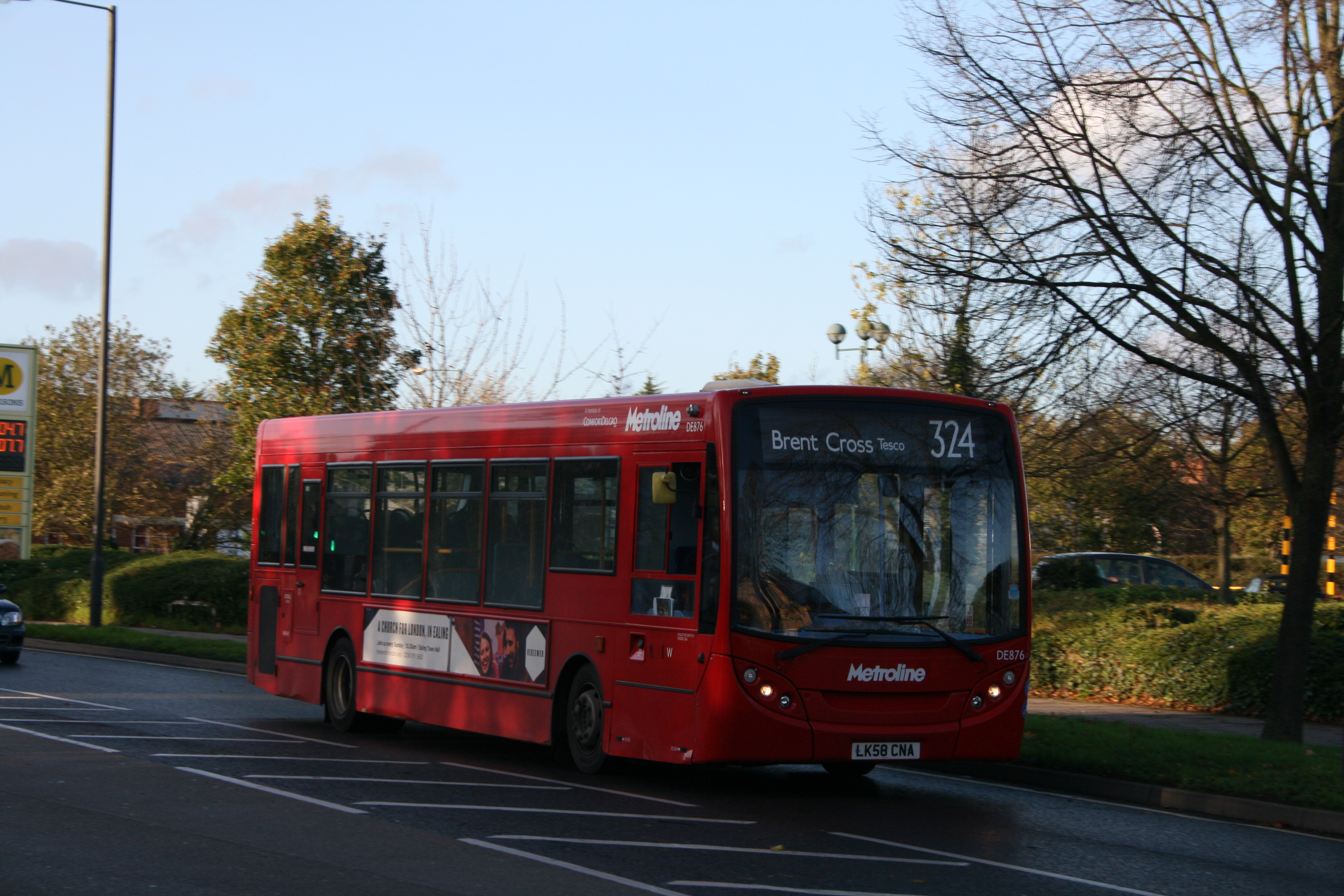
- Metroline Alexander Dennis Enviro200 Dart in Queensbury in November 2015

Overview
- Operator: Metroline
- Garage: Cricklewood
- Vehicle: Alexander Dennis Enviro200 MMC
- Peak vehicle requirement: 7
- Predecessors: Mobility Route 972
- Night-time: No night service

Route
- Start: Brent Cross
- Via: Hendon; Colindale; Kingsbury; Queensbury; Stanmore; Royal National Orthopaedic Hospital
- End: Elstree
- Length: 8 miles (13 km)

Service
- Level: Daily
- Frequency: About every 20-30 minutes
- Journey time: 32-65 minutes
- Operates: 05:00 until 00:57

London Buses route 324 is a Transport for London contracted bus route in London and Hertfordshire, England. Running between Brent Cross and Elstree, it is operated by Metroline.

== History ==
In 2009, Transport for London consulted on the possibility of introducing the route. Transport for London confirmed in February 2010 that the route was going ahead, and would be introduced in October. In preparation for introducing the route, route 972 which ran two return journeys per week was withdrawn, as was a shuttle bus service operated by Tesco between their Brent Cross supermarket and Brent Cross Shopping Centre. The route was introduced on 23 October 2010.

Operation of the route was taken over by Metroline on 24 October 2015.

In 2020, Transport for London launched a consultation for the extension of the route from Stanmore station to Centennial Park in Elstree, via the Royal National Orthopaedic Hospital. Calls for the route to serve the hospital had previously been dismissed by Transport for London as it stated the extension would require an additional bus and that there was insufficient demand. In July 2021, it was announced that the extension will go ahead.

== Current route ==
Route 324 operates via these primary locations:

- Brent Cross Tesco
- Brent Cross bus station
- Hendon Central station
- Colindale Colindeep Lane
- Kingsbury Roe Green Park
- Kingsbury station
- Queensbury Morrisons
- Stanmore Centenary Park
- Stanmore station
- Royal National Orthopaedic Hospital
- Elstree Centennial Park

== Frequency ==
Buses run every 20 minutes during Monday to Saturday daytimes, and every 30 minutes in the evenings and on Sundays.

== Reception ==
Prior to introduction, residents along the proposed route raised concerns that the roads were too narrow for the route to operate safely, and that the route would lead to increased traffic congestion.
