= Tai Choo Yee =

Malaysian YouTuber

- 戴祖亿
- Born: 戴祖亿; 3 June 1990 (age 36); Penang, Malaysia
- Other name: TCY
- Occupation: Journalist

YouTube information
- Channel: Tai Choo Yee 戴祖億
- Years active: 2019–present
- Genre: Review
- Subscribers: 288 thousand
- Views: 86.1 million
- Last updated: 21 October 2025
- Website: carplus.my

Tai Choo Yee (Chinese: 戴祖亿; pinyin: Dài Zǔ Yì, also known as TCY) is a Malaysian YouTuber and journalist from Penang, Malaysia uploading since 10 July 2019, most of his videos are test drives and car reviews. He is the creator of CarPlus and a former editor and news reporter for TopGear's Malaysian department.

== Family ==
- Hero Tai: Brother, Malaysian artist in Taiwan
