= Burlington Stores (off-price retailer) =

American off-price retail store chain

Burlington Stores, Inc.

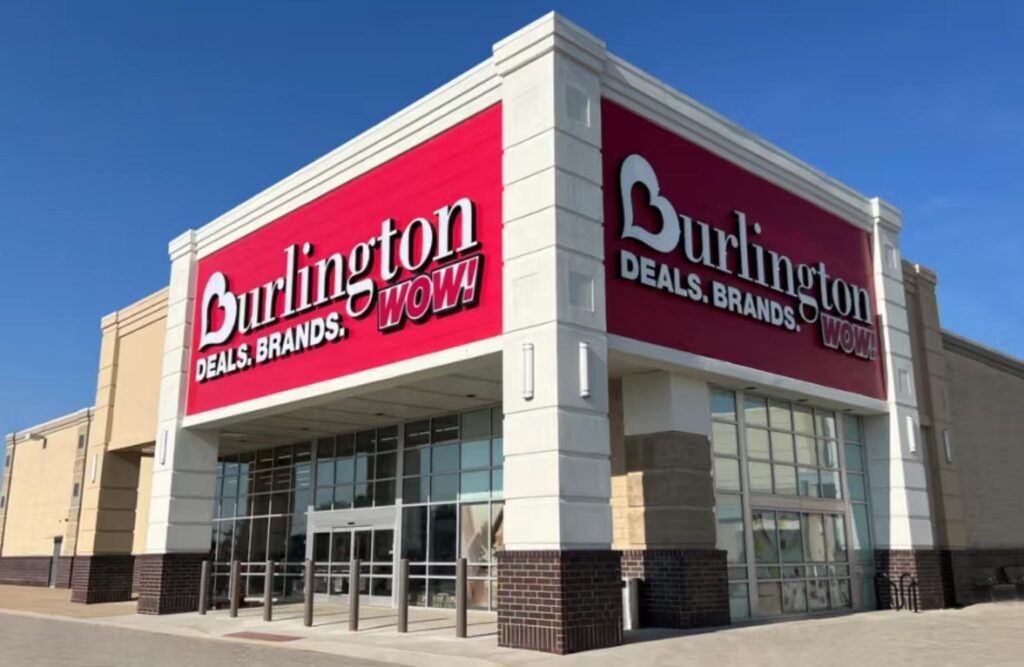
- Exterior of a typical Burlington store (2026)
- Trade name: Burlington
- Formerly: Burlington Coat Factory (1972–2009)
- Type: Public
- Traded as: NYSE: BURL; S&P 400 component
- Industry: Retail
- Founded: 1972; 54 years ago (as Burlington Coat Factory)
- Founder: Monroe Gary Milstein; Henrietta Milstein (nee Haas)
- Headquarters: Burlington, New Jersey, U.S.
- Number of locations: 1,287 (2026)
- Key people: Michael O'Sullivan (CEO); Jennifer Vecchio (Group President & CMO) Travis Marquette (President & COO); Kristin Wolfe (Executive Vice President & CFO)
- Products: Fashion-focused women’s apparel, menswear, youth apparel, baby, beauty, footwear, accessories, home, toys, gifts and coats.
- Revenue: ▲US$11.92 billion (2026)
- Operating income: ▲US$866 million (2026)
- Net income: ▲US$610 million (2026)
- Total assets: ▲US$9.919 billion (2026)
- Total equity: ▲US$1.837 billion (2026)
- Number of employees: 83,309 (2026)
- Website: www.burlington.com

Burlington Stores, formerly known as Burlington Coat Factory, is an American national off-price retailer, a division of Burlington Coat Factory Warehouse Corporation with more than 1,287 stores in 47 states and Puerto Rico. Its corporate headquarters is located in Burlington, New Jersey, with plans to relocate to Philadelphia, Pennsylvania, in 2029. In 2007, it was acquired by Bain Capital in a transaction and in 2008, Tom Kingsbury became president and CEO. The company went public again in 2013. Burlington is the third largest off-price retailer after TJX and Ross Stores.

== History ==
=== 20th century ===
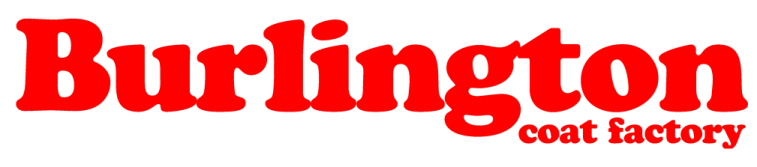
"Burlington Coat Factory" logo until 2005. A variant of this was used until 2010.

Monroe Gary Milstein and his father, Abe, had been running a successful wholesale and retail outerwear business together since 1946.

In 1972, Henrietta Milstein (born Haas) convinced her husband Monroe to purchase a former factory outlet in Burlington, New Jersey, for $675,050, using money she had saved from her job as a librarian for most of the $75,000 down payment. Initially, the Milsteins sold coats and jackets in wholesale, but in order to become less dependent on the seasonal coat business, they gradually began adding clothing items and accessories, eventually expanding into linens, gift items, a baby department and shoes.

A second location was opened in 1975 in Copiague on Long Island, and Milstein asked his son Lazer, who was living in Israel at the time, to return home and act as the store's legal owner for the new location. Lazer agreed, on the condition that the store be closed Saturdays in observance of the Sabbath. At the time, businesses faced legal action for being open on Sunday, with an exception made for religions observing a different Sabbath. In 1983, with 31 locations, the company, whose name was Burlington Coat Factory Warehouse Corporation since it was bought by the family in 1972, went public.

=== 21st century ===
In 2006, the company was purchased by Bain Capital Partners for $2.06 billion. The Milstein family held almost 30 million shares of the Burlington Coat Factory Warehouse Corporation, making approximately $1.3 billion, and Monroe Milstein was unassociated with the business following the sale, although two of his sons, Stephen and Andrew, stayed on briefly. Mark Nesci, the former executive vice president and chief operating officer, was named to serve as the acting CEO. A holding company called Burlington Coat Factory Holdings Inc., was formed to be the ultimate parent of the chain.

Monroe Gary Milstein died on May 9, 2025, in Bal Harbour, Florida.

In July 2012, the company received a $40 million incentive from the New Jersey Economic Development Authority as part of the state's GrowNJ program in order to build a new headquarters in Florence, adjacent to its existing headquarters, keeping the company from moving its headquarters outside the state.

On June 27, 2013, Burlington filed its S-1 registration statement with the SEC for an initial public offering. In October 2013, the company's stock rose more than 40% on its first day of trading. The company reported $4.35 billion in sales for the 12-month period ending August 3, 2013. As of October 2013, the company operated 503 stores in 44 states and Puerto Rico under the names Burlington Coat Factory, Cohoes Fashions, Baby Depot, and MJM Designer Shoes.

In 2014 The company changed its name to Burlington Stores to better reflect the breadth of inventory available.

In 2016, Burlington Stores joined the Fortune 500 for the first time. Tom Kingsbury served as the CEO from 2008 to 2018.

In September 2019, Michael O’Sullivan joined Burlington as Chief Executive Officer. O’Sullivan came to Burlington from Ross Stores, another off-price retailer, where he worked for 16 years, rising to become their President and Chief Operating Officer in 2009.

Following the bankruptcy and closure of all Bed Bath & Beyond stores in the United States, Burlington purchased the leases for more than 40 closed locations in June 2023. The following year, Burlington acquired the leases of 15 locations of the Texas-based retailer Conn's after their bankruptcy and store closings.

== Charitable partnerships ==
Burlington has partnered with charitable organizations for several years. Since 2002, they have partnered with the joining the Leukemia and Lymphoma Society's Light the Night campaign, collecting donations at the store checkout. With an annual fundraiser that runs from July through October, the company raised more than $3 million in 2013, bringing the total raised by the company to date to more than $19 million. In 2006, Burlington launched the Warm Coats and Warm Hearts Drive to collect coat donations for those in need. Partnering with ABC's Good Morning America and the national nonprofit Fashion Delivers, Burlington stores served as drop off spots for the donations, which were then distributed within the area by local charities. Since the program's inception, over 1.2 million coats have been collected and distributed.

In 2012, the company first partnered with WomenHeart: The National Coalition for Women with Heart Disease to promote women's heart health education during National Heart Health Month As part of this partnership, the company holds a yearly Red Dress Event, where red dresses are sold in stores, with $1 from every sale donated to WomenHeart. In 2014, as part of the partnership they launched the “Heart of Style Tour”. For the tour, a bus traveled to various store locations, with heart health professionals on board providing blood pressure tests and Body Mass Index (BMI) tests and education about women's heart disease.

== Business issues ==
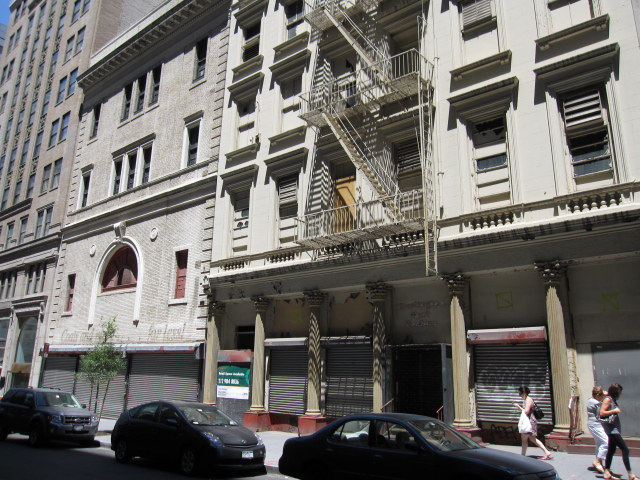
The old Burlington Coat Factory on 45 Park Place in New York. After the September 11, 2001 attacks, it was planned to be replaced by the unrelated controversial Park51. A 43-story residential tower was constructed instead.

Under investigation from animal welfare organization Humane Society of the United States, Burlington Coat Factory has been accused of labeling real fur products as "faux fur". The company agreed to pull the false advertisements after an undercover investigation revealed "faux fur" as actually made from the pelts of animals killed in China. Coats sold by stores such as Burlington Coat Factory have also been found to contain hair of raccoon dog.

From 1981 until 2009, Burlington Coat Factory's logo was supplemented with the tag "Not Affiliated with Burlington Industries." When Burlington Coat Factory settled a trademark dispute with fabric maker Burlington Industries in 1981, Burlington Coat Factory agreed to say in advertising that the two companies were not affiliated. Even though Burlington Industries ceased operations in 2004 following a buyout of its remaining operations, the "not affiliated" disclaimer remained on advertising logo and company media until 2009, when the text was retired from all logos used by the company.

An urban legend concerning snakes hiding in coats being sold at Burlington became widely circulated in the early 1990s. A representative from the company assured customers that since distribution centers and stores were maintained at 68 °F, a snake would not be able to survive retail conditions.

In the September 11, 2001, attacks, after hijacked United Airlines Flight 175 penetrated through the South Tower of The World Trade Center, part of the plane's landing gear and fuselage came out the north side of the tower and crashed through the roof and two of the floors of the Burlington Coat Factory at 45–47 Park Place, between West Broadway and Church Street, (600 feet [180 meters]) north of the former World Trade Center. The store had been the company's first location in Manhattan, opened in 1991. Three floor beams of the top floor of the building were destroyed, causing major structural damage. Nearly nine years later, the building was part of a national controversy, as efforts to build a Muslim center and mosque at the site as the "Cordoba House" sparked protest and was widely rejected.

== See also ==
- TJX
- Ross Stores
- List of department stores of the United States
