= Kingsbury tube station =

London Underground station

Kingsbury
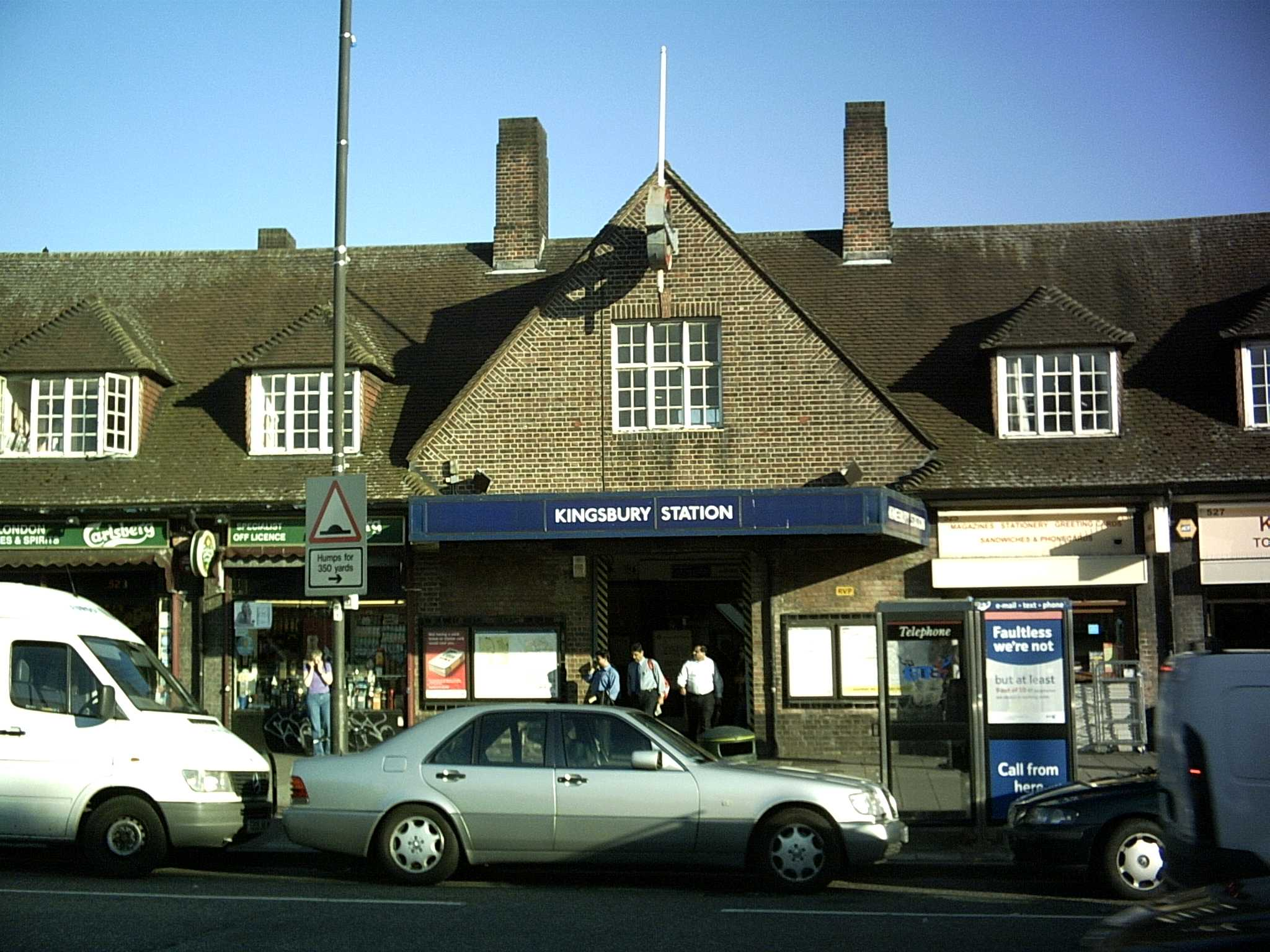
- Entrance on Kingsbury Road
- Interactive map of Kingsbury

General information
- Location: Kingsbury
- Local authority: London Borough of Brent
- Managed by: London Underground
- Number of platforms: 2
- Accessible: Yes
- Fare zone: 4

London Underground annual entry and exit
- 2020: ▼3.24 million
- 2021: ▼2.07 million
- 2022: ▲3.37 million
- 2023: ▲3.47 million
- 2024: ▲3.95 million

Railway companies
- Original company: Metropolitan Railway

Key dates
- 10 December 1932: Opened

Other information
- External links: TfL station info page
- Coordinates: 51.5847°N 0.2786°W

Kingsbury is a London Underground station in Kingsbury, north-west London. It is on the Jubilee line between Queensbury and Wembley Park stations, and is in London fare zone 4. The station is located in the London Borough of Brent.

Although now only served by deep-level tube trains, the section of line serving the station is built to surface gauge, and trains to that larger LU loading gauge occasionally pass through.

== History ==
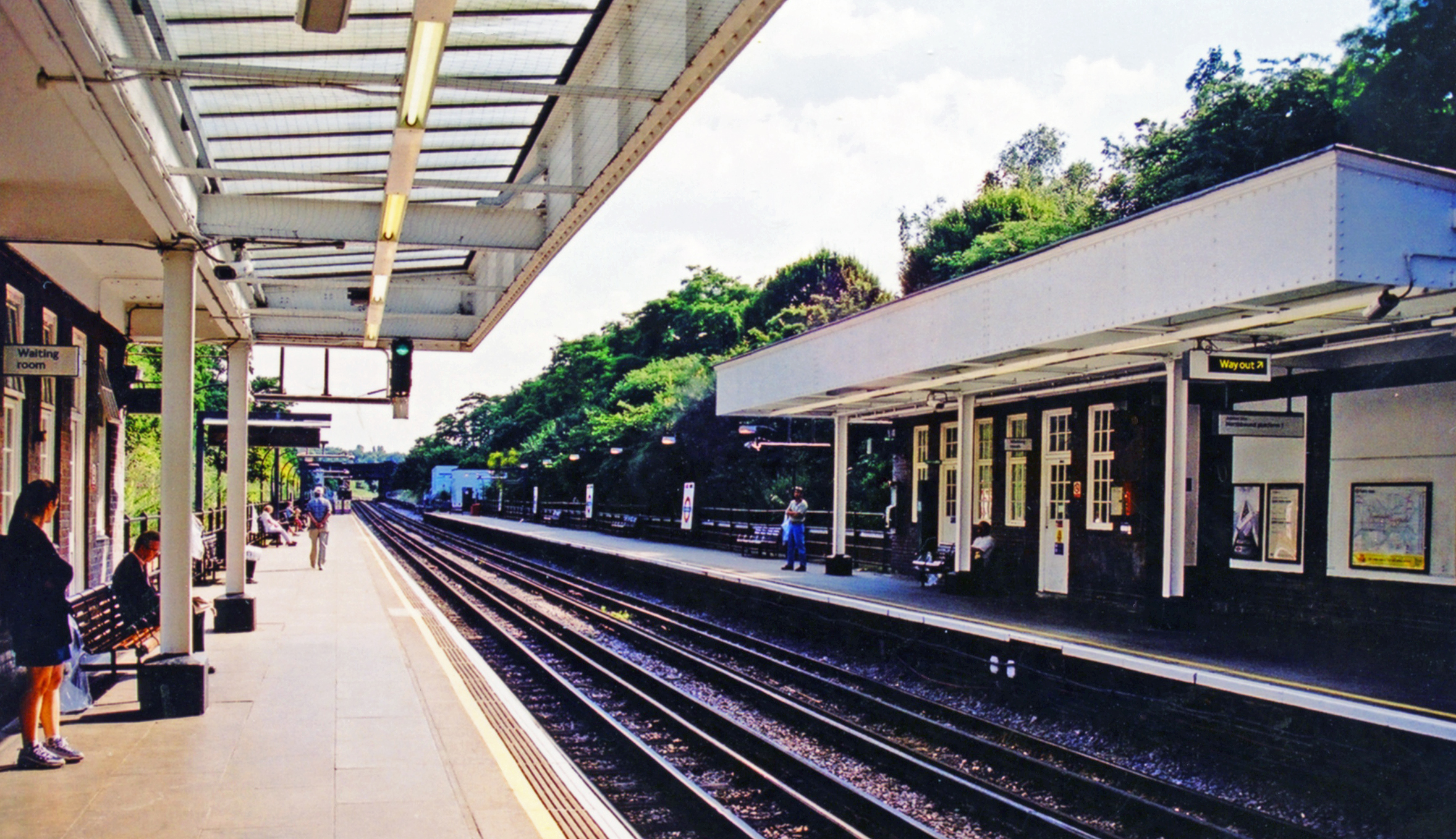
Kingsbury station, London Underground 2000.

The station was opened on 10 December 1932 as part of the Stanmore branch of the Metropolitan Railway and served by that company's electric trains. After the formation of London Transport in 1933, this branch became part of the LU’s Metropolitan line which was later transferred to the Bakerloo line in 1939 and then to the Jubilee line in 1979. The design style is similar to that of other Metropolitan Railway buildings of the same period rather than to the concrete and glass style used at the same time by the LER group. In common with other nearby Metropolitan Railway stations (e.g. Harrow-on-the-Hill, Neasden, Queensbury) there is an element of fiction in the station name; the area is properly within the eastern extent of Kenton (Kingsbury Road at this point was originally part of the eastern end of Kenton Lane) and Kingsbury proper is actually closer to Neasden LU station.

== Location ==
The station entrance is in a parade of shops on the south side of the A4006 Kingsbury Road, opposite Berkeley Road.

== Connections ==
London Buses routes 79, 183, 204 and 324, night route N98, Superloop bus SL10 and non-TFL route 644 serve the station.

| Preceding station | London Underground | Following station |
|---|---|---|
| Queensbury towards Stanmore | Jubilee line | Wembley Park towards Stratford |
Former services
| Queensbury towards Stanmore | Metropolitan line Stanmore branch (1932–1939) | Wembley Park towards Baker Street or Aldgate |
| Queensbury towards Stanmore | Bakerloo line Stanmore branch (1939–1979) | Wembley Park towards Elephant & Castle |
