= Gladys Kingsbury =

American actress (1876 – 1958)

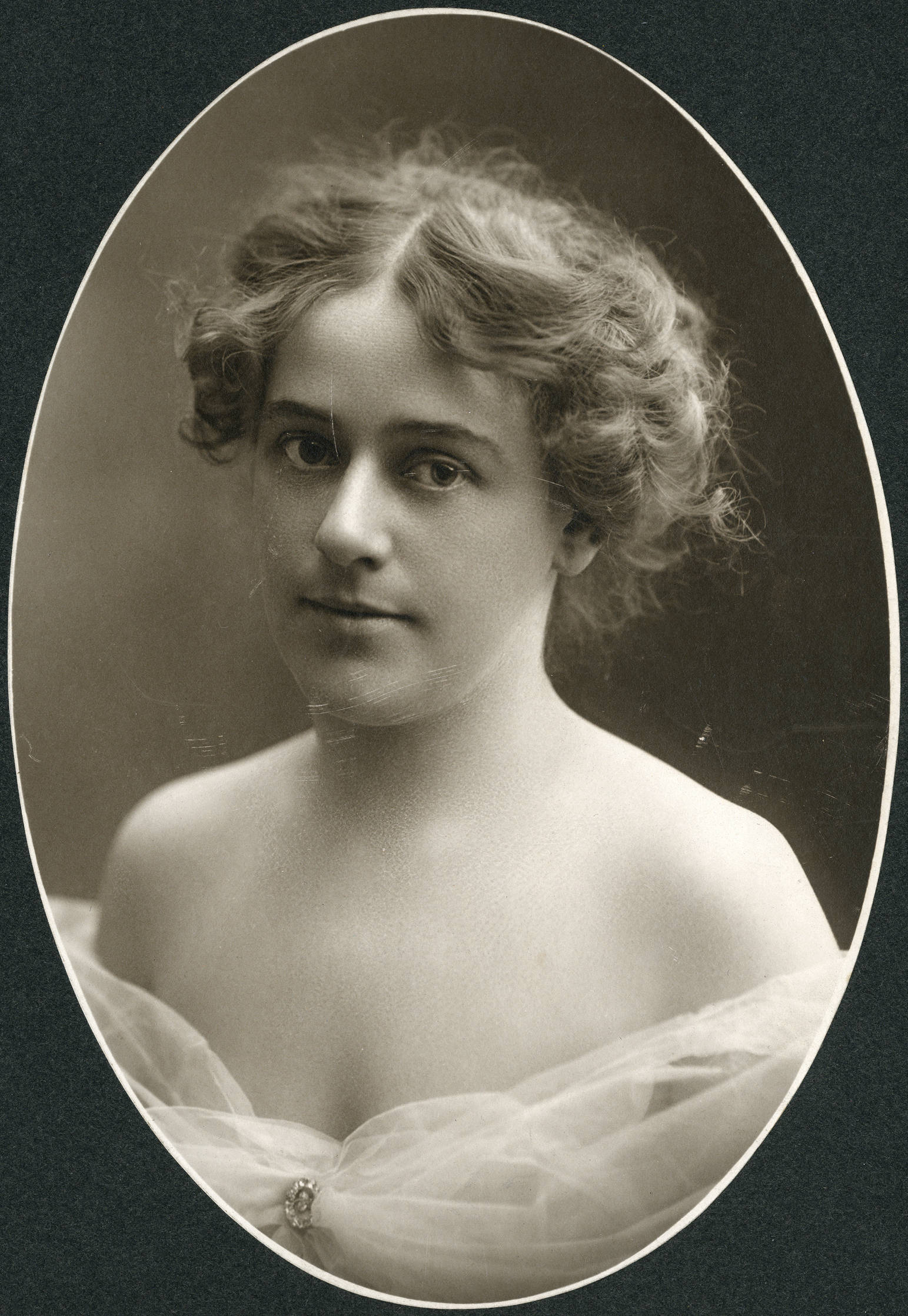
- Born: June 30, 1876; Oakland, California, U.S.
- Died: November 10, 1958 (aged 82); San Bernardino, California, U.S.
- Occupation: Actress
- Spouse: Frank Cooley

Gladys Kingsbury (July 30, 1876 – November 10, 1958) was an American silent film actress and screenwriter mainly known for her role in Her Younger Sister (1914). She was married to Frank Cooley.

== Filmography ==
- Ima Knutt Gets a Bite (Short) (1916) as Mrs. Banks - Ima's Mother-in-Law
- Bubbles and the Barber (Short) (1916) as Mrs. Bubbles
- Cooking His Goose (Short) (1916) as Mrs. Banks
- The Laird o'Knees (Short) (1916) as Mrs. Bellegraham
- To Be or Not to Be (Short) (1916) as Mrs. Frummerly
- Billy Van Deusen's Shadow (Short) (1916)
- A Deal in Diamonds (Short) (1915) as The Landlady
- The Redemption of the Jasons (Short) (1915) as Mrs. Sniffins - the Village Gossip
- Little Chrysanthemum (Short) (1915) as Mrs. Leighton
- The Stay-at-Homes (Short) (1915) as Mrs. Baldwin
- The Face Most Fair (Short) (1915) as Nurse
- The Doctor's Strategy (Short) (1915) as Mrs. Jones
- The Haunting Memory (Short) (1915) as Marie
- The Constable's Daughter (Short) (1915) as Mary Hicks - the Constable's Wife
- The Happier Man (Short) (1915) as Mary Fuller - the Reporter
- The Spirit of Giving (Short) (1915) as Mrs. Stearns
- Brass Buttons (Short) (1914) as Mrs. McArthur - Mary's Mother
- Her Younger Sister (Short) (1914) as Emma Lyons, his daughter
- The Girl in Question (Short) (1914) as Maude Simpson - the Gossip
- As a Man Thinketh (Short) (1914) as Mrs. William Jones
- A Rude Awakening (Short) (1914) as Mary Bolton
- Dad and the Girls (Short) (1914) as First Stenographer
- The Legend of Black Rock (Short) (1914) as Mona Reaves
- The Tale of a Tailor (Short) (1914) as Mrs. Lane - the Mother
- Nancy's Husband (Short) (1914) as The Widow
- Metamorphosis (Short) (1914) as Laura Burr, Frank's Sister
- Her Heritage (Short) (1914) as Mrs. Warren
- The Peacock Feather Fan (Short) (1914) as Widow Willing
- The Girl Who Dared (Short) (1914) as Lill – Maggie's Sister

== Writer ==
- Her Younger Sister (Short) (1914) story, as Mrs. Frank Cooley)
