= Kingsbury School =

Kingsbury School may refer to:

United Kingdom

- Kingsbury High School, a comprehensive school in Kingsbury, London
- Kingsbury School, Warwickshire, a comprehensive school in Kingsbury, Warwickshire
- Kingsbury School and Sports College, a comprehensive school in Birmingham

United States

- Kingsbury High School, Tennessee, a high school in Shelby County Schools (Tennessee) in Memphis, Tennessee
