= Henry Kingsbury =

Henry Kingsbury (born 1943) is a pianist turned ethnomusicologist. He is notable for his book, Music, Talent, and Performance, an ethnographic study of an American conservatory of music. This book examines the social and cultural nature of musical talent, understood within the anthropological framework of such theorists as Emile Durkheim, E.E. Evans-Pritchard, and Clifford Geertz. The appearance of Kingsbury’s book in 1988 marked an innovative and significant application of principals of ethnomusicology in the study of Western art music.

Kingsbury has written of the role that personal change can play in the ethnographic approach. He writes, “just as fieldwork is often understood to be a traumatic personal experience, so also… can traumatic experience be retrospectively reconstituted as ‘fieldwork’.” Kingsbury was born in 1943. He was a disciple of the pioneering ethnomusicologist Alan P. Merriam.

In 1991, while he was a faculty member in the music department at Brown University, Kingsbury suffered serious injury during brain surgery. His efforts to resume his academic career after recuperation included a pair of lawsuits under the Americans with Disabilities Act. He has chronicled this episode in two self-published booklets.
