= Kathleen Kingsbury =

American journalist and editor

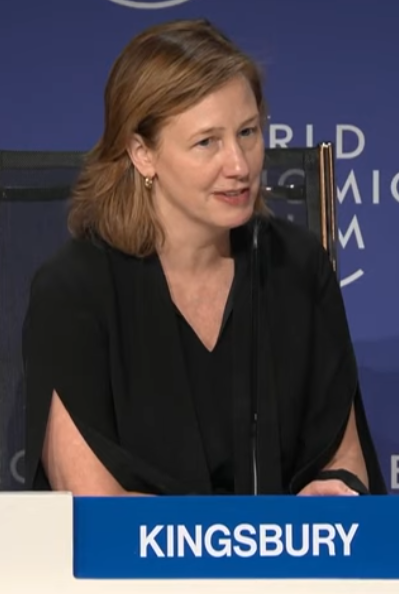
- At the WEF Annual Meeting in 2025
- Education: Georgetown University (BS); Columbia University (MS)
- Occupations: Journalist and editor
- Employer: The New York Times
- Known for: Opinion and editorial writing
- Title: Opinion editor, The New York Times
- Honours: Pulitzer Prize in Editorial Writing, 2015

Kathleen Kingsbury is an American journalist and editor. She is the Opinion Editor at The New York Times.

== Early and personal life ==
Kathleen Kingsbury, the daughter of Tom Kingsbury, grew up in Portland, Oregon. She attended Mount Alvernia High School before obtaining her bachelor's degree from the Walsh School of Foreign Service at Georgetown University. She was awarded a graduate degree from the Columbia Journalism School, where she had been the recipient of a Pulitzer Traveling Fellowship.

Kingsbury has two children.

== Career ==
Kingsbury worked for Time magazine as New York-based staff writer and as a Hong Kong-based correspondent.

In 2013, Kingsbury joined the editorial board of The Boston Globe, later becoming deputy managing editor and deputy editorial page editor. Kingsbury joined The New York Times in August 2017 as a deputy editorial page editor. On June 7, 2020, she was named "as acting Editorial Page Editor through the November election" at The New York Times, replacing James Bennet. In January 2021, she was named Opinion Editor by Publisher A.G. Sulzberger. She has also contributed to Time, Reuters, The Daily Beast, BusinessWeek, and Fortune.

Kingsbury's "Service Not Included" series about labor conditions in Boston restaurants earned her the Walker Stone Award for Editorial Writing from the Scripps Howard Foundation in 2014, as well as the Burl Osborne Award for Editorial Leadership from the American Society of News Editors in 2015.

In 2015, Kingsbury won a Pulitzer Prize for Editorial Writing for a series of articles exposing the unfair working conditions facing restaurant workers, including the negative financial effects of the American tipping system, the prevalence of wage theft, and the real human cost of cheap menu items. In 2018, she was a finalist in the same category for her work on an editorial series about domestic violence and gun ownership.

In February 2021, Kingsbury refused to run a column by Bret Stephens in which he criticized the Times's dismissal of Donald G. McNeil Jr. Stephens' comments were later published by the New York Post.

== Controversies ==
Kingsbury has been the source of controversy both publicly and within the New York Times staff since taking over as opinion editor. Kingsbury wrote one of the Times opinion articles that dismissed transgender youth and called their gender identity a phase. There have also been other articles published in the opinion section, that she edits, that are alleged to be dismissive of the issues of trans youth.
