= Kingsbury House =

Historic house in Massachusetts, United States

- U.S. National Register of Historic Places
- U.S. Historic district – Contributing property
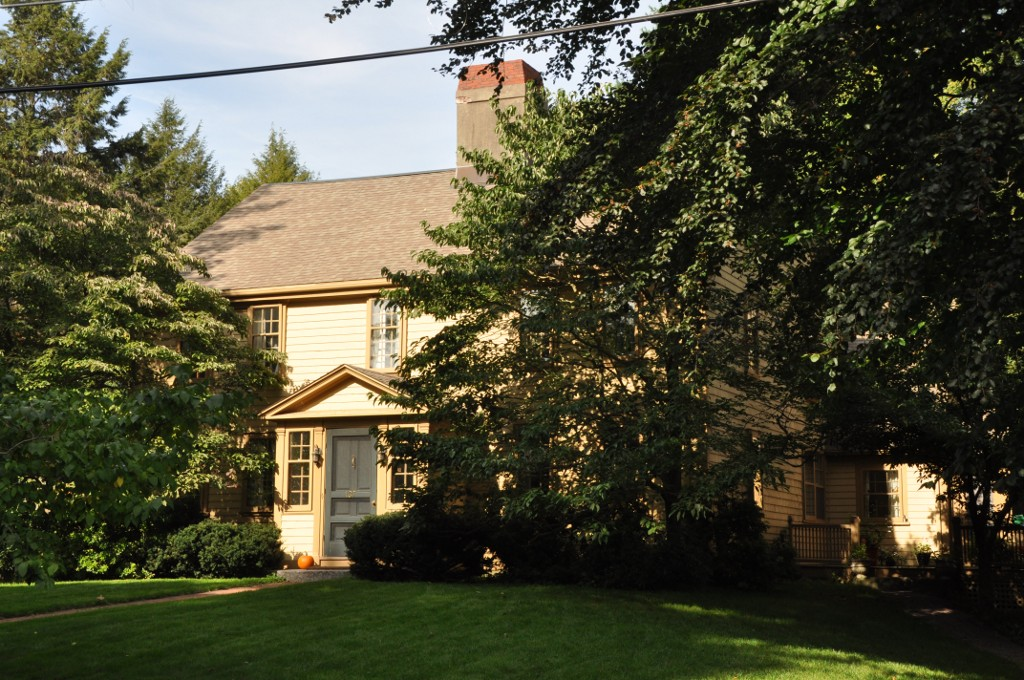

- Location within Massachusetts Location within the United States
- Location: 137 Suffolk St., Newton, Massachusetts
- Coordinates: 42°19′44″N 71°10′17″W
- Built: 1686 (traditional) c.1700 (NRHP)
- Architectural style: Georgian
- Part of: Old Chestnut Hill Historic District (ID90000007)
- MPS: Newton MRA
- NRHP reference No.: 86001848

Significant dates
- Added to NRHP: September 04, 1986
- Designated CP: February 16, 1990

The Kingsbury House is a historic house at 137 Suffolk Street in the Chestnut Hill section of Newton, Massachusetts. The oldest part of this 2 1/2-story timber frame may have been built as early as 1686; its exterior styling suggests a construction date in the early 18th century, but the earlier structure may have been incorporated in new construction at that time. The house is one a few First Period houses in Newton, and was associated for many years in the 19th century with the Kingsbury family, who were major landowners in the Chestnut Hill area.

The house was listed on the National Register of Historic Places in 1986, and included in an expansion of the Old Chestnut Hill Historic District in 1990.

== See also ==
- List of the oldest buildings in Massachusetts
- National Register of Historic Places listings in Newton, Massachusetts
