= Canons Park tube station =

London Underground station

Canons Park
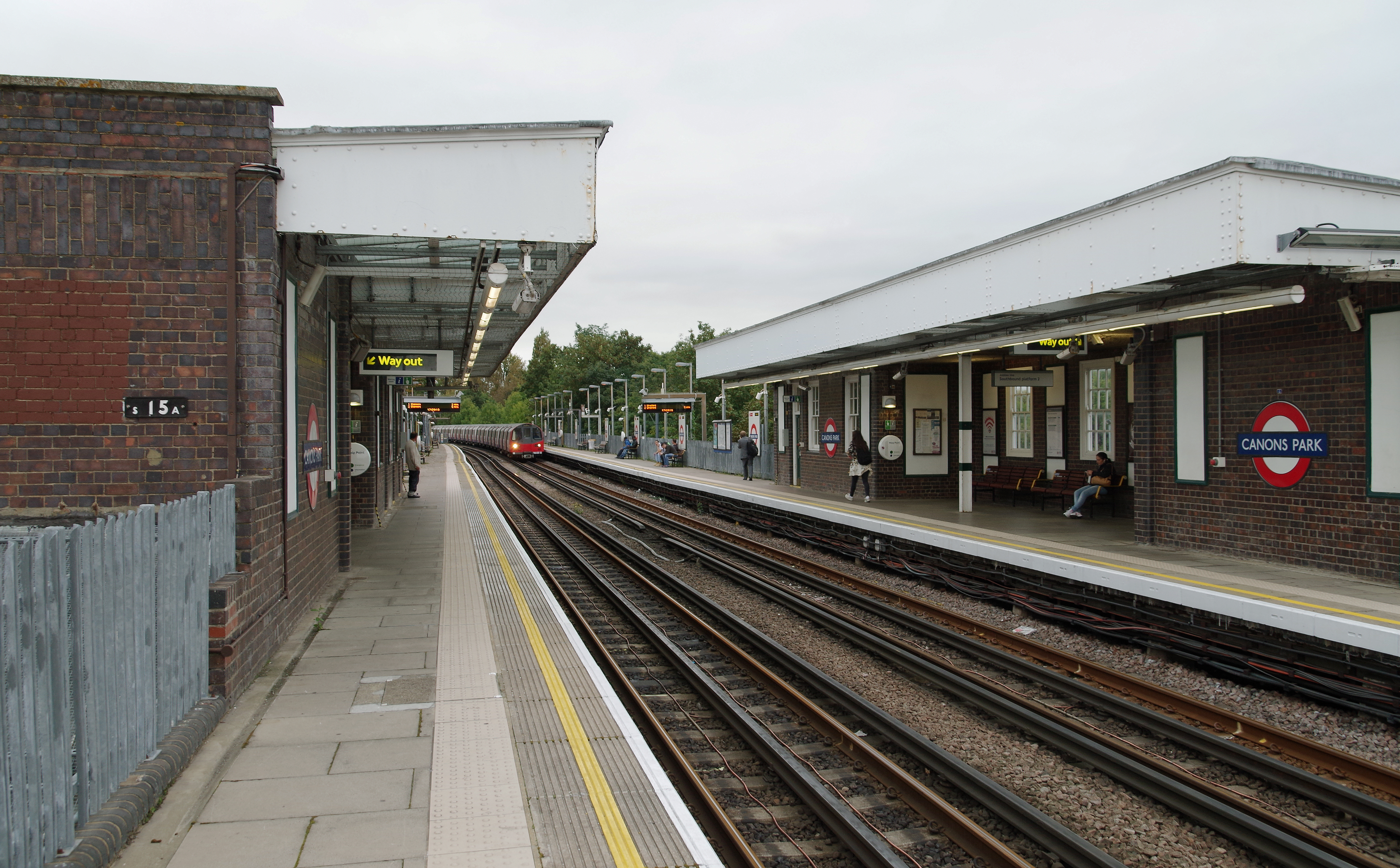
- Jubilee line northbound platform at the station
- Interactive map of Canons Park

General information
- Location: Canons Park
- Local authority: Harrow
- Managed by: London Underground
- Number of platforms: 2
- Fare zone: 5

London Underground annual entry and exit
- 2021: ▼1.25 million
- 2022: ▲2.06 million
- 2023: ▲2.07 million
- 2024: ▲2.12 million
- 2025: ▼2.04 million

Railway companies
- Original company: Metropolitan Railway

Key dates
- 10 December 1932: Opened as Canons Park (Edgware)
- 1933: Renamed Canons Park
- 20 November 1939: Metropolitan line service replaced by Bakerloo line
- 1 May 1979: Bakerloo line service replaced by Jubilee line

Other information
- External links: TfL station info page
- Coordinates: 51.60778°N 0.29472°W

Canons Park is a London Underground station. It is located at Canons Park of the London Borough of Harrow, north-west London. The station is on the Jubilee line, between Stanmore and Queensbury stations. It is in London fare zone 5.

Canons Park is the least used station on the Jubilee line with an average of 1.68 million passengers per year.

== History ==
The station was opened on 10 December 1932 by the Metropolitan Railway (MR) on the MR's extension from Wembley Park to Stanmore. The station was originally named Canons Park (Edgware) although the suffix was dropped the following year. On 20 November 1939, services on the Stanmore branch were transferred to the Bakerloo line and, on 1 May 1979, they were transferred again to the Jubilee line.

== Services ==
Canons Park station is on the Jubilee line in London fare zone 5. It is between Stanmore to the north and Queensbury to the south. Train frequencies vary throughout the day, but generally operate every 2–6 minutes between 06:08 and 00:17 in both directions.

Preceding station	London Underground	Following station
Stanmore Terminus	Jubilee line	Queensbury towards Stratford
Former services
Stanmore Terminus	Metropolitan line Stanmore branch (1932–1939)	Queensbury towards Baker Street or Aldgate
Stanmore Terminus	Bakerloo line Stanmore branch (1939–1979)	Queensbury towards Elephant & Castle

== Connections ==
London Bus routes serve the station.
