= Tracy Municipal Airport (California) =

Tracy Municipal Airport Tracy Auxiliary Airfield
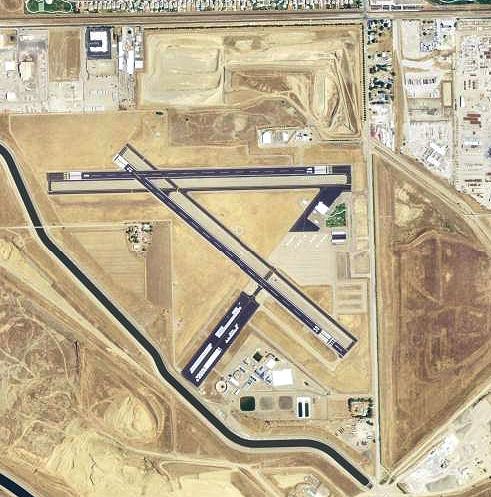
- 2006 USGS airphoto
- IATA: none; ICAO: KTCY; FAA LID: TCY

Summary
- Airport type: Public
- Owner: City of Tracy
- Operator: FBO SkyView Aviation LLC
- Location: Tracy, California
- Elevation AMSL: 193 ft / 59 m
- Coordinates: 37°41′20″N 121°26′30″W

Map
- Location

Runways
| Direction | Length | | Surface |
| Direction | ft | m | Surface |
|---|---|---|---|
| 7/25 | 4,005 | 1,221 | Asphalt |
| 12/30 | 4,001 | 1,220 | Asphalt |

Statistics (2005)
- Aircraft operations: 60,000
- Based aircraft: 122
- Source: Federal Aviation Administration

Tracy Municipal Airport (ICAO: KTCY, FAA LID: TCY) is three miles (5 km) southwest of Tracy, in San Joaquin County, California. It is owned by the City of Tracy.

Most U.S. airports use the same three-letter location identifier for the FAA and IATA, but Tracy Municipal Airport is TCY to the FAA and has no IATA code.

== Facilities ==
Tracy Municipal Airport covers 310 acres (130 ha) and has two asphalt runways, 8/26 & 12/30, the longer one is 4,000 x 75 ft (1,220 x 23 m).

In the year ending May 17, 2017, the Tracy Municipal airport had 60,000 aircraft operations, average 161 per day: 99% general aviation and 1% air taxi. 107 aircraft are based at the airport: 80 single engine, 4 multi-engine, 1 jet, 2 helicopters and 20 ultralight.

== World War II ==
During World War II, the airport was Tracy Auxiliary Airfield (No 4), and was an auxiliary training airfield for Stockton Army Airfield, California.

== See also ==
- California World War II Army Airfields
