= Kingdon Airpark =

Kingdon Airpark Kingsbury Auxiliary Airfield
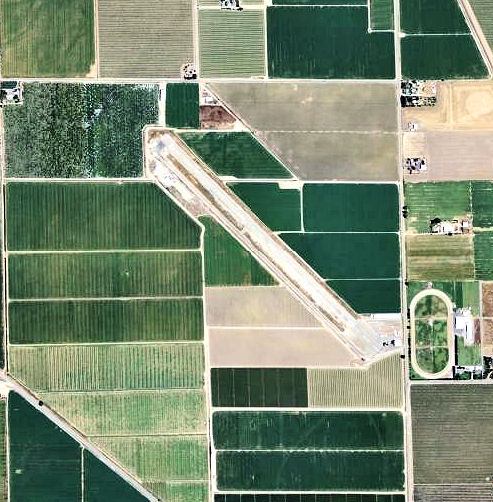
- 2006 USGS airphoto
- IATA: none; ICAO: none; FAA LID: O20

Summary
- Serves: Lodi, California
- Coordinates: 38°05′29″N 121°21′33″W

Map
- Location of Kingdon Airpark

Runways
Direction	Length		Surface
Direction	ft	m	Surface
12/30	3,705	1,129	Asphalt

Kingdon Airpark is a general aviation airport located 4 miles southwest of Lodi, California.

== History ==
During World War II, the airport was designated as Kingsbury Auxiliary Airfield (No 1), and was an auxiliary training airfield for Stockton Army Airfield, California.

== See also ==
- California World War II Army Airfields
