= Stanmore tube station =

London Underground station

Stanmore
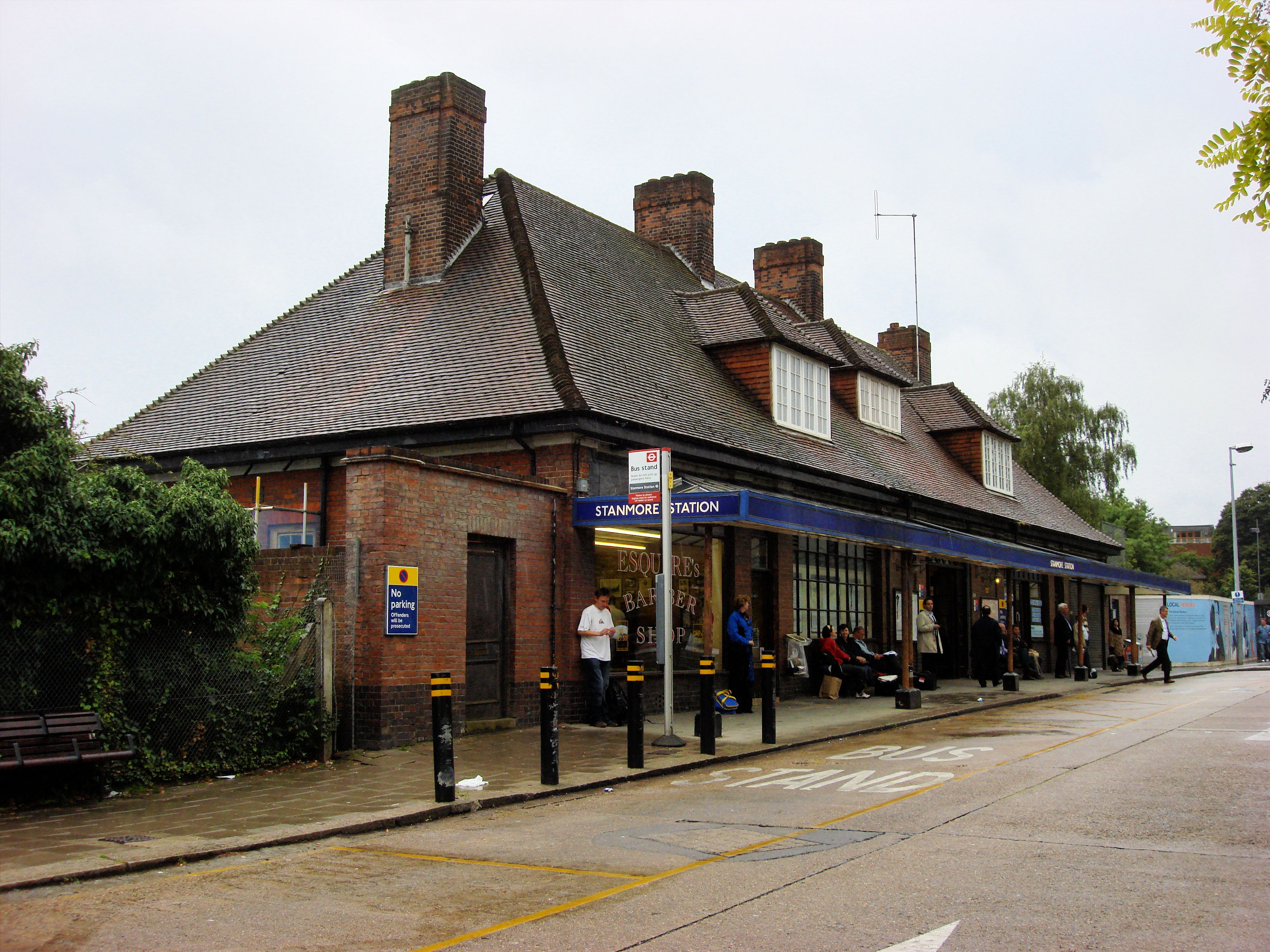
- Stanmore station
- Interactive map of Stanmore

General information
- Location: Stanmore
- Local authority: Harrow
- Managed by: London Underground
- Number of platforms: 3
- Accessible: Yes
- Fare zone: 5

London Underground annual entry and exit
- 2020: ▼2.02 million
- 2021: ▼1.73 million
- 2022: ▲2.90 million
- 2023: ▲3.00 million
- 2024: ▲3.25 million

Railway companies
- Original company: Metropolitan Railway

Key dates
- 10 December 1932: Opened (Metropolitan Railway)
- 1936: Goods yard closed
- 20 November 1939: Transferred to Bakerloo line
- 1 May 1979: Transferred to Jubilee line

Other information
- External links: TfL station info page
- Coordinates: 51.61944°N 0.30278°W

Stanmore is a London Underground station in Stanmore, north-west London. It is the northern terminus of the Jubilee line and the next station towards south is Canons Park. The station is located on the south side of London Road (part of the A410), and is in London fare zone 5.

== History ==
Stanmore station was opened on 10 December 1932 by the Metropolitan Railway (now the Metropolitan line). The station building and those on the branch were designed by the Metropolitan Railway's architect, Charles W. Clark, in the suburban style used on the company's other post-First World War stations such as those on the Watford branch. The introduction of fast, direct trains into London attracted commuters to the Metropolitan Railway and presented competition for the London, Midland and Scottish Railway, who operated a rival train service from Stanmore Village railway station approximately 0.62 miles (1.00 km) away. The slower LMS trains ran on the Stanmore branch line as far as Harrow & Wealdstone, where they connected with London-bound services, but after 20 years of competing with the Metropolitan line, the Village station was closed by British Railways in 1952.

In 1934, a proposal to extend the Metropolitan line northwards was discussed by the London Passenger Transport Board's Engineering Committee as an alternative or complementary scheme to the extension of the Northern line from Edgware. It would have required 1.2 miles (1.9 km) of double track tunnel to reach the proposed station at Elstree South with Metropolitan line trains continuing to Bushey or Aldenham. A revision of the proposal in 1936, considered extending the Stanmore line to Elstree. The proposals were not included in the plans eventually submitted for parliamentary approval in the LPTB's New Works Programme.

Following construction of deep-level tube tunnels between Finchley Road and Baker Street, the Stanmore branch of the Metropolitan line with its five stopping stations between Finchley Road and Wembley Park was transferred to the Bakerloo line on 20 November 1939. This service was then transferred to the Jubilee line on 1 May 1979.

In 2005, Transport for London began the construction of a third platform at the station. This was structurally complete by the summer of 2009 but could not be brought into use until new signalling equipment on that part of the line had been commissioned, the platform opening to use in July 2011.

== Services ==
Stanmore station is the northern terminus of the Jubilee line in London fare zone 5. The next station is Canons Park to the south.

The off-peak service in trains per hour (tph) is:

- 12tph to Stratford

The peak service in trains per hour (tph) is:

- 18tph to Stratford
- 3tph to North Greenwich

Night Tube services:

- 6 tph Stanmore – Stratford

Preceding station	London Underground	Following station
Terminus	Jubilee line	Canons Park towards Stratford
Former services
Terminus	Metropolitan line Stanmore branch (1932–1939)	Canons Park towards Baker Street or Aldgate
Terminus	Bakerloo line Stanmore branch (1939–1979)	Canons Park towards Elephant & Castle

== Connections ==
London Buses routes 142, 324 and H12 and night route N98 serve the station.

== See also ==
- Stanmore Village railway station, a main line station to the south-west closed to passengers in 1952 and completely in 1964
