= Spitalfields Market =

Spitalfields Market may refer to:

- Old Spitalfields Market, a covered market in Spitalfields, just outside the City of London
- New Spitalfields Market, a market in Leyton, East London, which opened in 1991
