= Stratford Market Depot =

London Underground maintenance depot

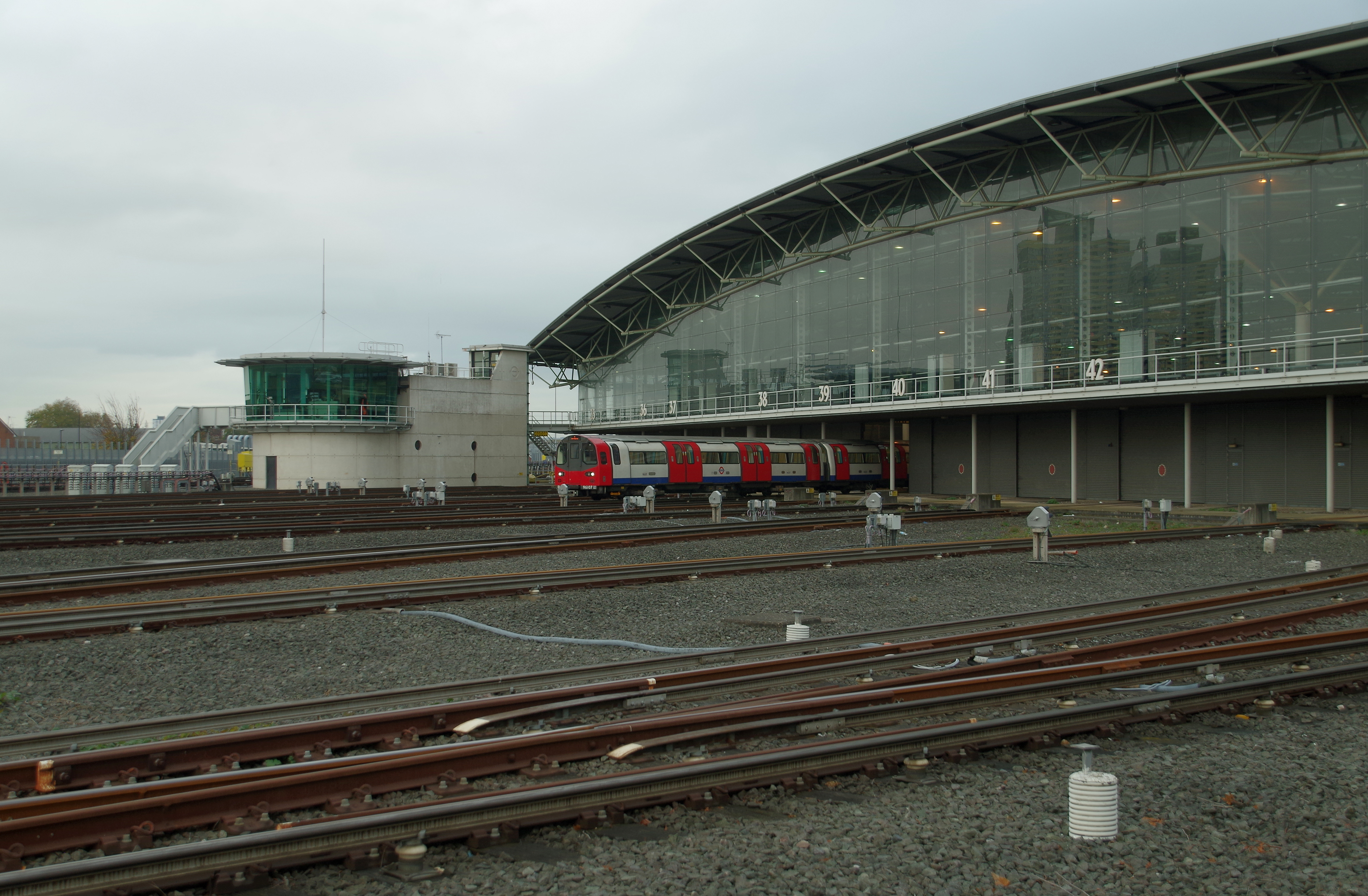
- Northern end of the depot in 2017
- Interactive map of Stratford Market Depot

Location
- Location: Stratford, London, England
- Coordinates: 51.5344°N 0.0008°E

Characteristics
- Rolling stock: 1996 Stock

History
- Opened: March 1998

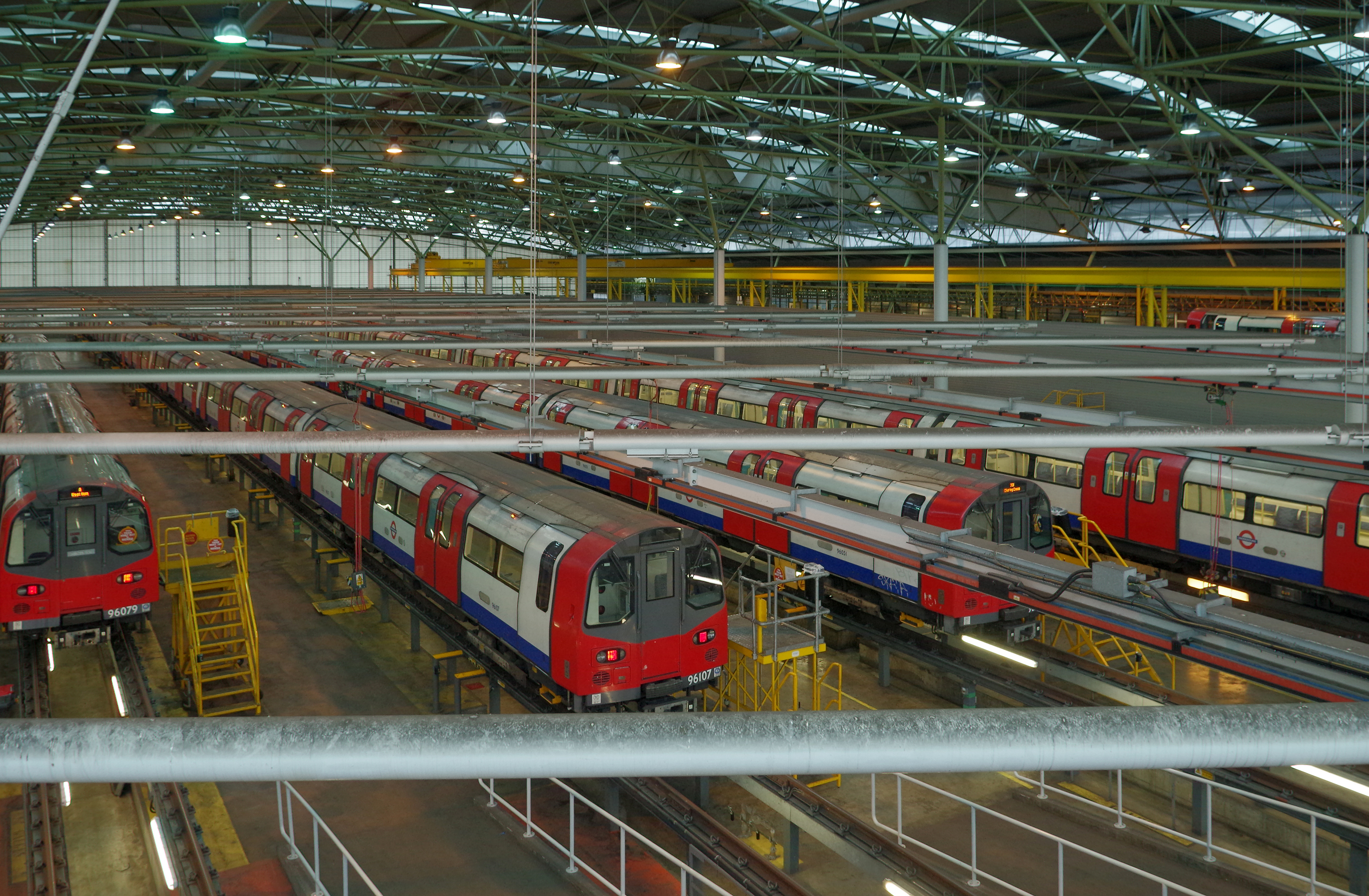
1996 Stock trains stabled at Stratford Market Depot in 2017

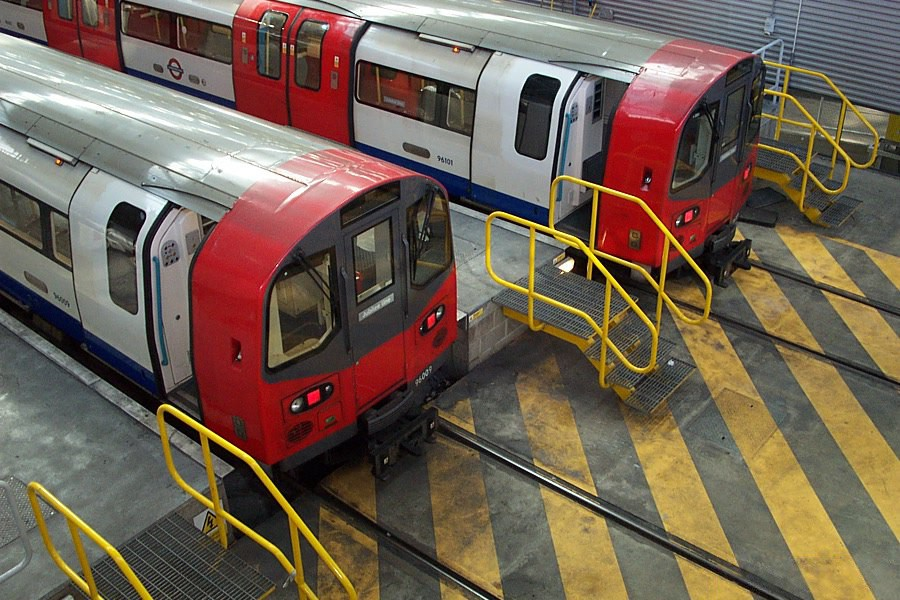
Two 1996 Stock trains stabled at the depot

Stratford Market Depot is a London Underground depot located in Stratford in the London Borough of Newham, between Stratford and West Ham stations on the Jubilee line. Constructed in the mid 1990s as part of the Jubilee Line Extension, the site is the main depot for stabling and maintaining the line's 1996 Stock trains, although some trains are stabled at Neasden Depot.

== History ==
Stratford Langthorne Abbey, a Cistercian monastic abbey was founded in 1135 on the site. The abbey survived until the dissolution of the monasteries in 1538. In 1879, the Great Eastern Railway opened a new wholesale fruit and vegetable market at Stratford to rival Spitalfields Market. This market gave its name to the local Stratford Market train station. After 112 years, the wholesale market closed on 13 May 1991, moving to New Spitalfields Market in Leyton. The market buildings were demolished in 1992 to make way for the Jubilee line depot.

=== Construction of the depot ===
The Jubilee Line Extension project required the construction of a new depot to serve the extended Jubilee line, given the increased number of trains could not be accommodated at the existing Neasden Depot site. The site at Stratford Market was chosen instead of sites at Stratford TMD, Thornton Fields and the Greenwich Peninsula, as the land was mostly available with few commercial and industrial occupiers. To commemorate the former use of the site as a fruit and vegetable market, the new facility was named Stratford Market Depot.

Construction began in April 1994, with archaeological excavations uncovering evidence of Stratford Langthorne Abbey, as well as 674 graves. These were reburied at the modern Cistercian Abbey of Mount St Bernard Abbey in Leicestershire. The depot fully opened in March 1998, prior to completion of the extension – allowing for testing and commissioning of the new 1996 Stock trains, as well as the testing of the new extension itself.

=== Jubilee line depot ===
Designed by Chris Wilkinson Architects, the main depot building is parallelogram shaped, and features a 100-metre (330 ft) wide by 190-metre (620 ft) long arched roof that covers 11 maintenance roads. Outside, the depot has 33 stabling roads, with the layout of the 11-hectare (27-acre) site designed to mitigate archaeological impacts to the Stratford Langthorne Abbey. The main depot building was awarded a Civic Trust Award in 1998.

As well as the Jubilee line depot, a large training centre for London Underground is located at the site. This was opened by Tube Lines in 2005, as part of the Underground Public-private partnership.

== See also ==
- Neasden Depot
- Jubilee line
