= Stratford High Street DLR station =

Docklands Light Railway station

Stratford High Street
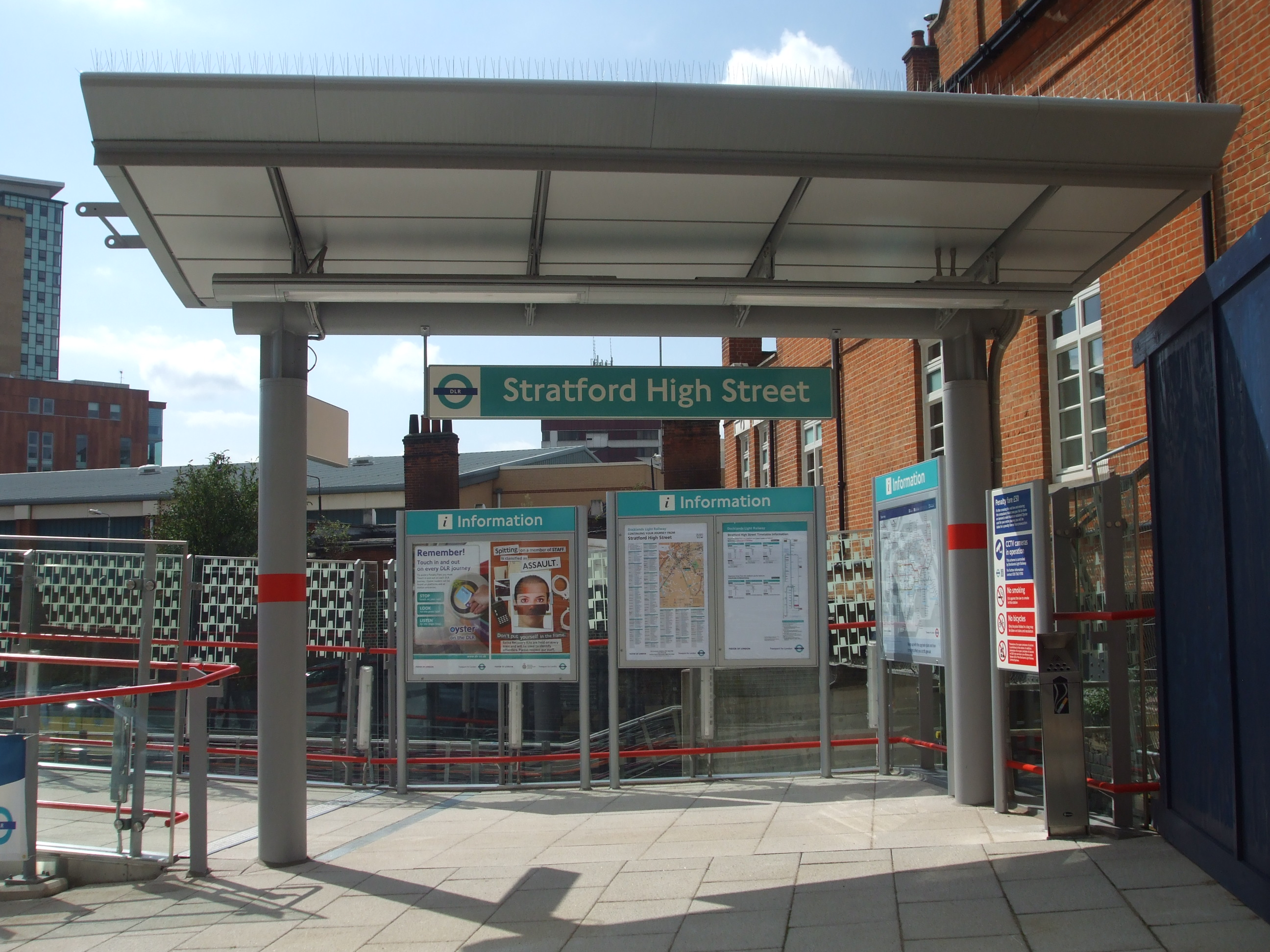
- Northern entrance

General information
- Location: Stratford, Newham
- Coordinates: 51.5379°N 0.0006°W
- Owned by: Transport for London
- Managed by: Docklands Light Railway
- Platforms: 2

Construction
- Structure type: At-grade
- Accessible: Yes

Other information
- Status: Unstaffed
- Fare zone: 2 and 3
- Website: Official website

History
- Opened: 14 June 1847
- Previous names: Stratford Bridge (1847–1880); Stratford Market (1880–1898); Stratford Market (West Ham) (1898–1923); Stratford Market (1923–1957)

Key dates
- 1892: Station resited
- 6 May 1957: Railway station closed
- 31 August 2011: DLR station opened

Passengers

DLR annual entry and exit
- 2020: ▼0.918 million
- 2021: ▼0.888 million
- 2022: ▲1.190 million
- 2023: ▲1.290 million
- 2024: ▼1.15 million
Location
- Location in Newham

Stratford High Street is a Docklands Light Railway station in Stratford in London, England. It is located on the Stratford International branch of the Docklands Light Railway, which opened on 31 August 2011. The site was the location of an earlier railway station from 1847 to 1957, known initially as Stratford Bridge and later as Stratford Market - after the nearby wholesale fruit and vegetable market.

== History ==
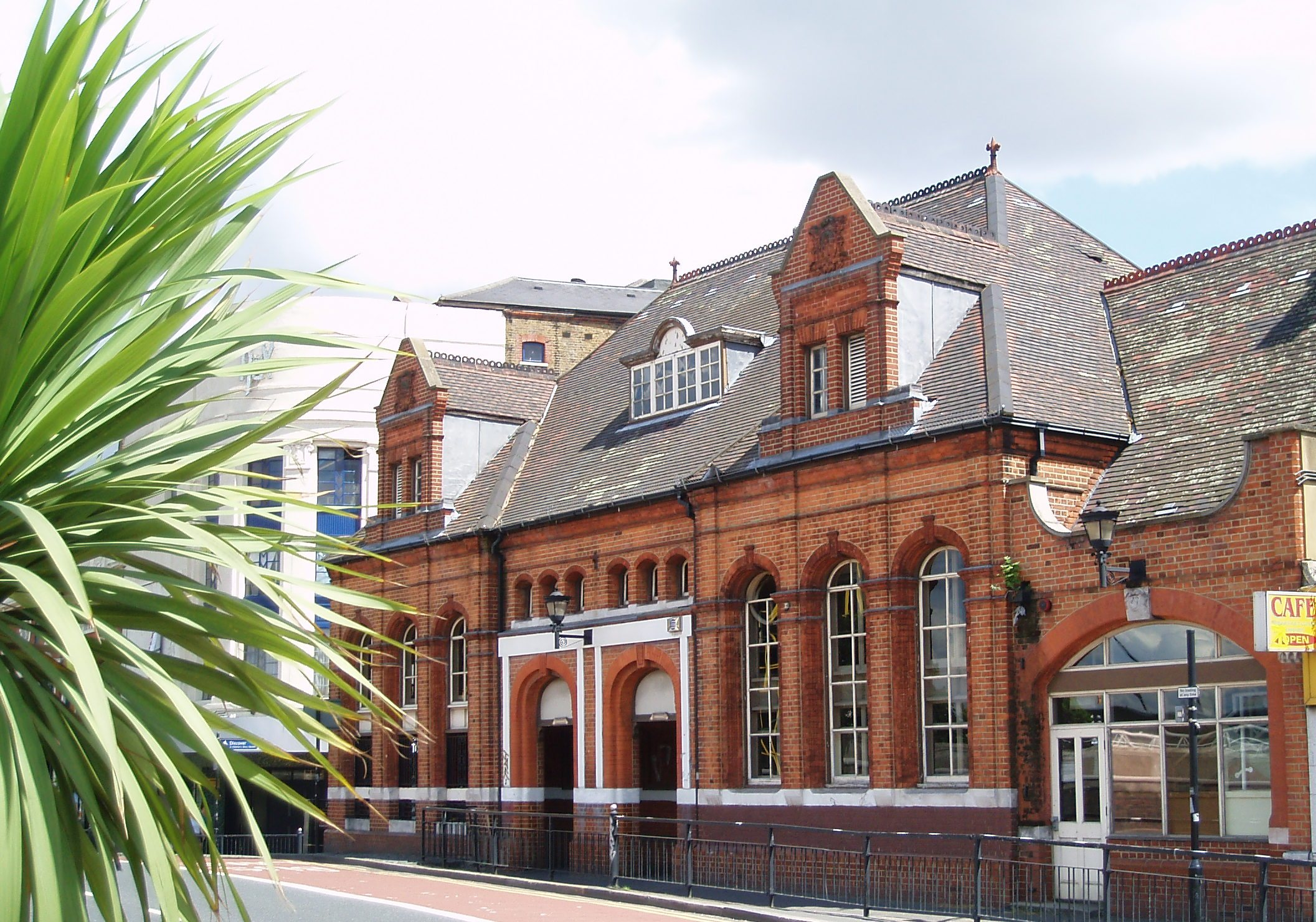
Extant station entrance to Stratford Market

The first station on the site was opened as Stratford Bridge on 14 June 1847 in Stratford on the Eastern Counties and Thames Junction Railway (ECR) between Stratford and Canning Town stations. By the 1860s the railways in East Anglia were in financial trouble, and most were leased to the ECR; they wished to amalgamate formally, but could not obtain government agreement for this until 1862, when the Great Eastern Railway (GER) was formed by amalgamation. Thus Stratford Bridge became a GER station in 1862.

=== Stratford Market ===
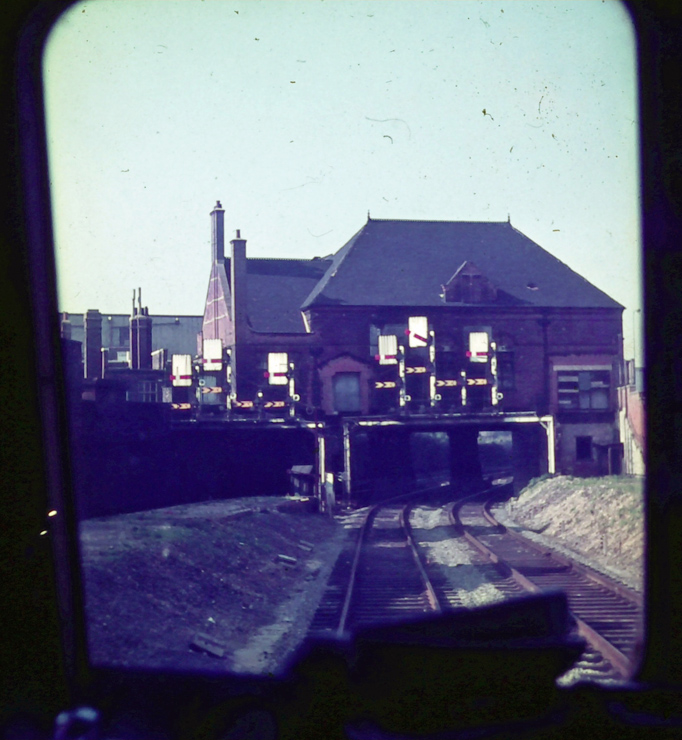
Stratford Market station in 1965

In 1879, the Great Eastern Railway opened a wholesale fruit and vegetable market at Stratford to rival Spitalfields Market, and the station was renamed Stratford Market on 1 November 1880. The station was resited in 1892 when the line was widened. On the western platform there was a tower that contained steps that allowed direct access over the goods lines to the adjacent Great Eastern Railway's printing works which opened in 1893. As of 2016 the building is still extant.

=== 1905 collision ===
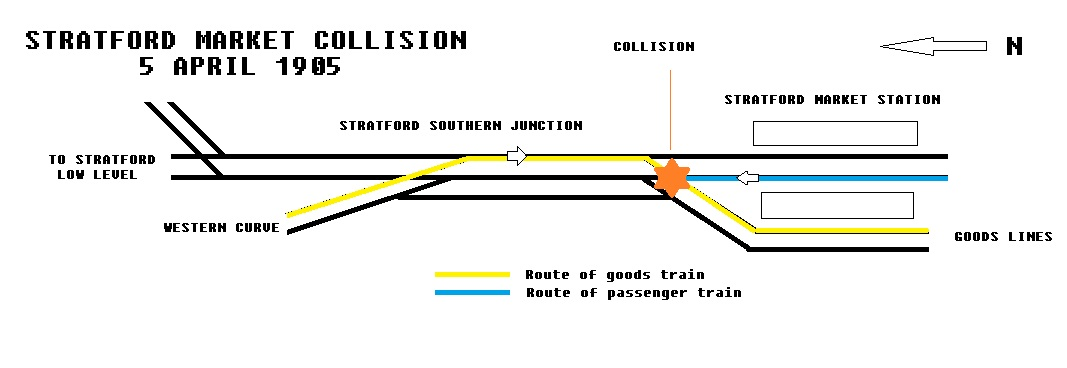
Stratford Market Collision

On 5 April 1905 two trains collided just north of Stratford Market station. At this time there were several junctions between Stratford Low Level platforms and Stratford Market station and a goods train was making a move from the Western Curve to the Goods Lines at Stratford Market. An empty coaching stock train was stopped at Stratford Market station awaiting a path towards Stratford Low Level when the driver, thinking he had the right to proceed, started the train having failed to properly check the signals were set against him.

The two trains collided on the junction directly north of the station with the goods engine overturning and killing its fireman William Secker, who was crushed under the locomotive after jumping off.

=== Nationalisation and station closure ===
Following the 1923 grouping the station was operated by the London and North Eastern Railway. The second station was itself renamed twice: to Stratford Market (West Ham) in 1898, resuming the name Stratford Market in 1923.

Following nationalisation of the railways in 1948 the station became part of British Railways Eastern Region. The North Sea floods of 31 January 1953 saw tracks in the station flooded. The station closed on 6 May 1957 due to lack of traffic and the proximity of the larger Stratford station, which was also served by other lines. The tracks remained however, with services continuing to North Woolwich.

=== Docklands Light Railway ===
The line through the station site to North Woolwich closed in December 2006 for works to start on conversion of the North London line to Docklands Light Railway (DLR) operation. The station reopened as Stratford High Street as part of the Stratford International extension on 31 August 2011.

== Design ==
The original red brick station buildings from the original station still stand on the south side of Stratford High Street.

It is provided with a footbridge connection to Bridge Road in order to provide access to the surrounding areas. In order to locate the DLR station here part of Bridge Road has been permanently closed to vehicles except for emergency access, and access into Burford Road from the A118 blocked. This avoided the need to take land from Rokeby School whilst also enabling the station to be located close to Stratford High Street.

Along with Abbey Road, Stratford and Star Lane - the station has artwork Places of Exchange by Scottish artist Toby Paterson - tessellated patterns inspired by the local area, etched into the glass panels of the station.

== Services ==
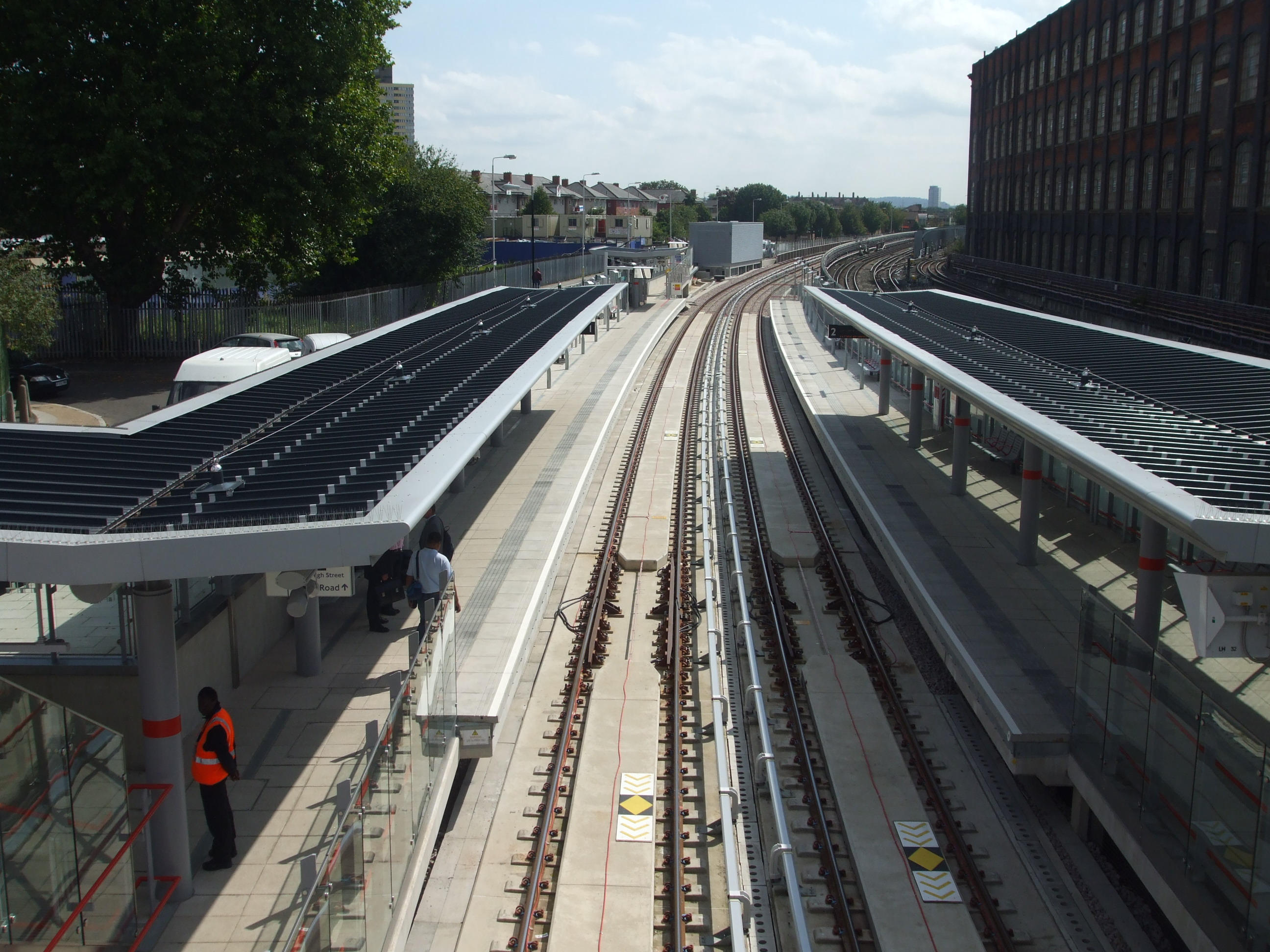
Platforms looking south.

The typical off-peak service in trains per hour from Stratford High Street is:

- 6 tph to Stratford International
- 6 tph to Woolwich Arsenal

Additional services call at the station during the peak hours, increasing the service to up to 8 tph in each direction.

Preceding station	DLR	Following station
Stratford towards Stratford International	Docklands Light Railway	Abbey Road towards Woolwich Arsenal
	Disused railways	
Stratford	British Railways Eastern Region Palace Gates Line	Canning Town

== Connections ==
London Bus routes 25, 276, 425, D8 and night route N8 and N25 also serve the station from nearby bus stops.

== Goods depot ==
In 1879, the Great Eastern Railway opened a wholesale fruit and vegetable market at Stratford at Stratford to rival Spitalfields Market. To serve this market, a large goods depot was located south of the station on the western side of the line. Additionally, a coal depot served the Patent Victoria Stone Works.

In 1907 the market depot became the centre for the distribution of bananas in London with Fyfes and Elders both having depots on the site. Around this time the depot had capacity for 400 wagons (a standard wagon being 21 feet (6.4 m) long). The depot closed in the 1960s although the sidings were used for storage of withdrawn rolling stock for a number of years afterwards. After 112 years, the wholesale market at Stratford closed on 13 May 1991, moving to New Spitalfields Market in Leyton. The market buildings and sidings were demolished in 1992 to make way for the Jubilee line depot.

== See also ==
- Stratford Market Depot
- Stratford Market
