= Neasden Depot =

London Underground railway depot

Coordinates: 51.5578°N 0.2586°W

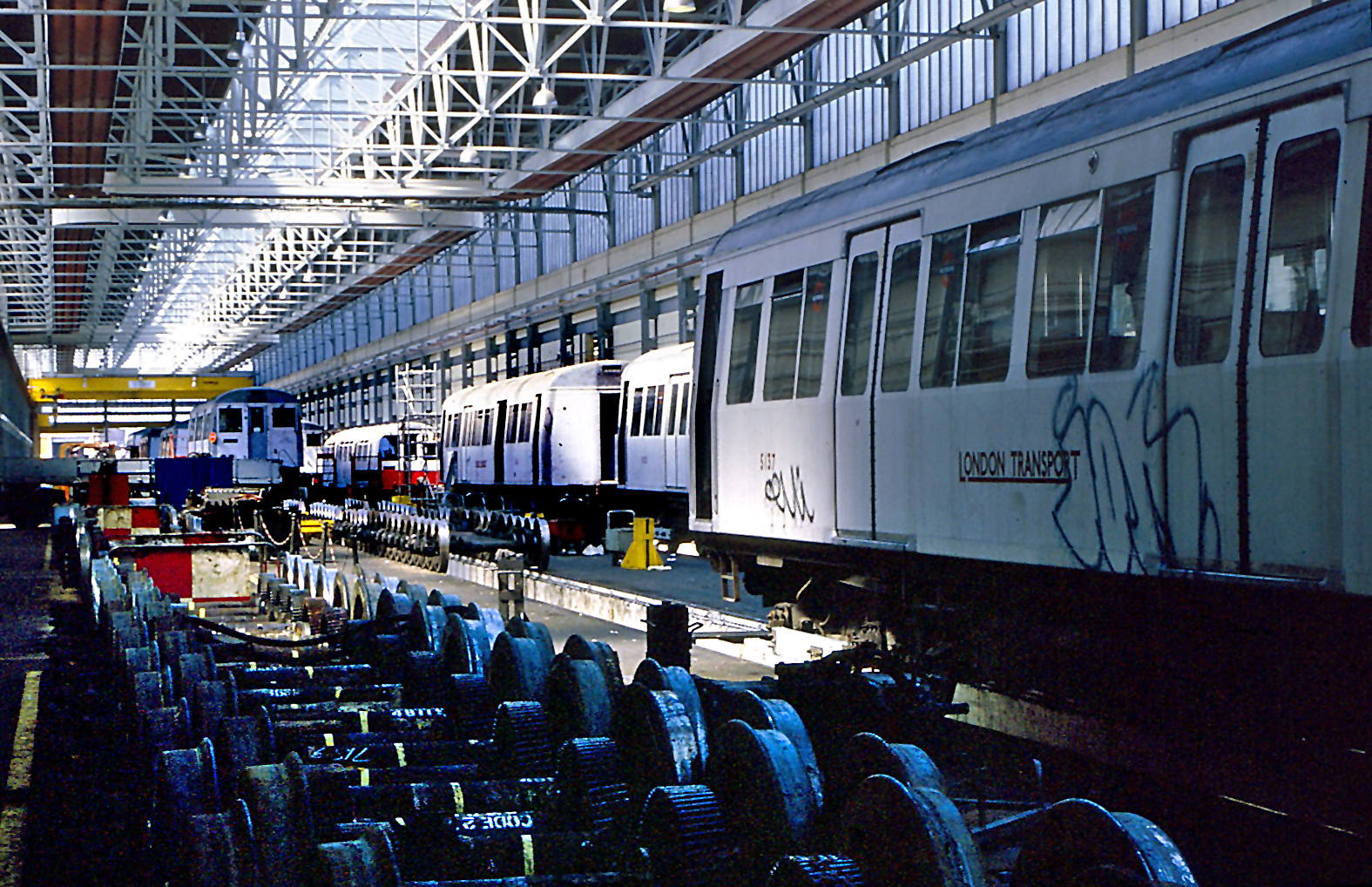
- The inside of the depot in 1988
- Interactive map of Neasden Depot

Location
- Location: Neasden, London, England

History
- Opened: 1882

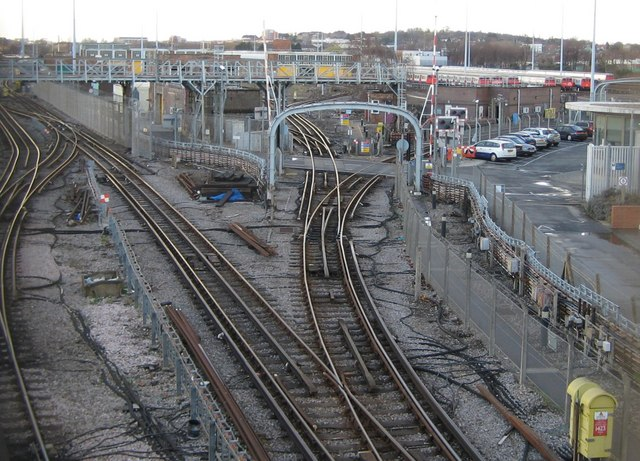
South end of Neasden Depot, photo taken from the North Circular Road (A406) bridge

Neasden Depot is a London Underground depot located in Neasden in the London Borough of Brent, between Neasden and Wembley Park stations on the Metropolitan line. It is the largest depot on the London Underground, and is currently responsible for maintenance and overhaul of the 191 S Stock trains used on the Circle, District, Hammersmith & City and Metropolitan lines.

== History ==
Neasden was opened as a locomotive and coach plant in 1882, producing locomotives and coaching stock for the Metropolitan Railway. The final locomotive produced at the works was in 1898. The depot serviced both steam and electric Metropolitan locomotives.

Major work was undertaken at Neasden between 2010 and 2011, with much of the 1930s layout being altered to make it suitable for maintenance of the S Stock, which began to be rolled out in 2010 to all London Underground Sub Surface lines.

Due to the rebuild, Neasden's steam shed has now been decommissioned and converted into the Depot's training facility.

== Jubilee Line ==
24 Jubilee line trains also stable at Neasden Depot, however these are now serviced in Stratford Market Depot, an extensive new build facility built as part of the Jubilee Line Extension on part of the site of the old Stratford Works.

Although not part of the Depot, the Jubilee line signalling control centre is based on the same site.

== Metropolitan Line ==
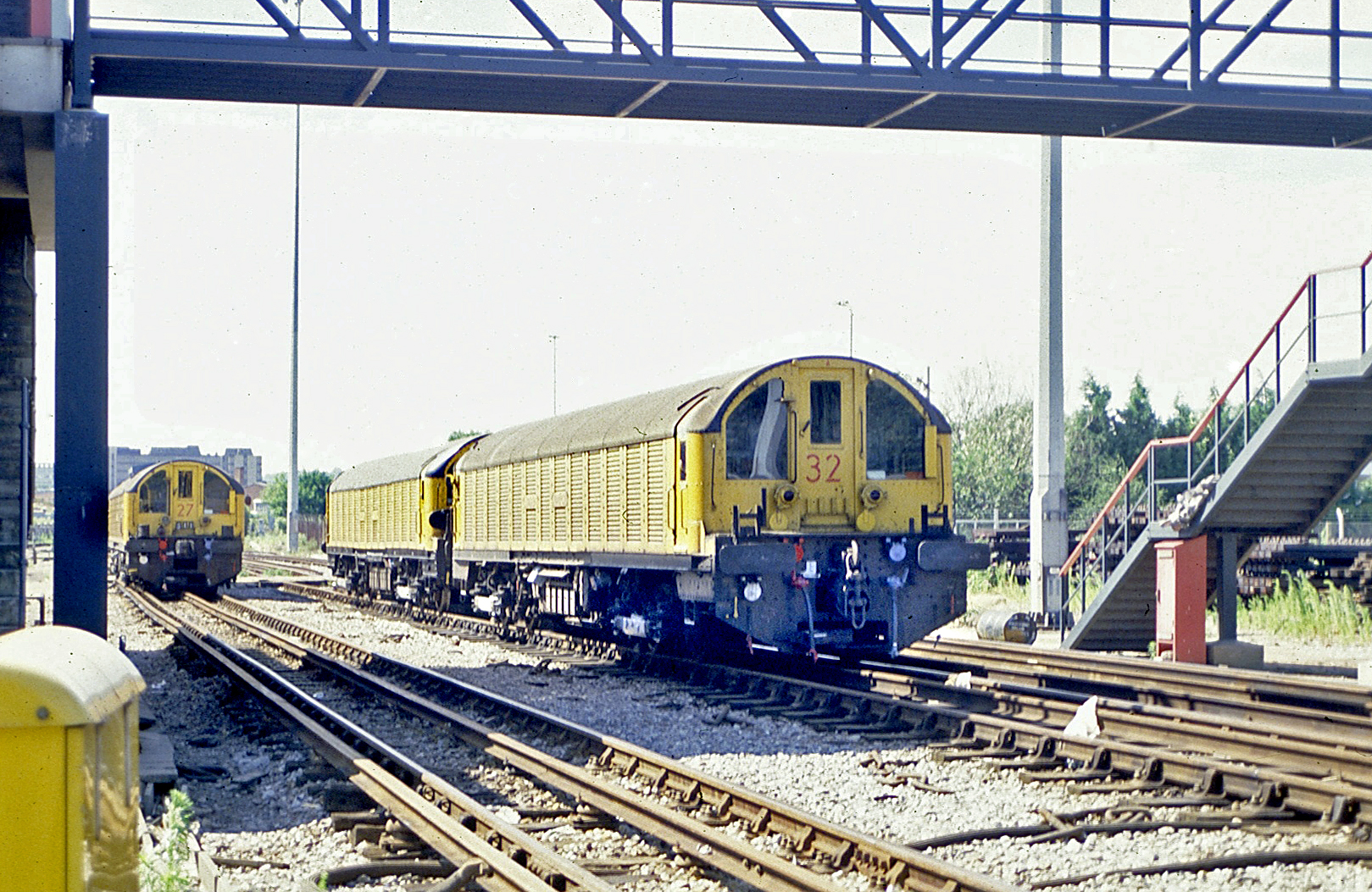
Battery electric works locomotives 20, 27, and 32 in sidings at Neasden Depot in 1988.

Neasden is now the main depot for the Metropolitan line, stabling passenger trains, and works vehicles including battery electric locomotives and wagons. Access to the depot by road is just off Neasden Lane, and is the home to one of only a handful of level crossings on the Underground. It is also possible to access the depot by foot from Neasden station via a subway at the north end of the station. A final point of entry is at the end of Quainton Street, in Neasden village, where the street names are named after the furthest extents of the old Metropolitan Railway: Quainton, Verney, Chesham and Aylesbury.

The depot also carries out S Stock servicing for trains used on the District line, on the Hammersmith & City line and on the Circle line.

== Incidents ==
On 17 March 1976, a train inspector discovered an IRA bomb on a train at Neasden depot. It was later defused.

== See also ==
- Neasden station
- Neasden Power Station
- Acton depot
- Metropolitan line
