= Stratford Market =

Former East London fruit and vegetable market

Coordinates: 51.5344°N 0.0008°E

Stratford Market was a wholesale fruit and vegetable market, located in Stratford in the London Borough of Newham. Opened in 1879 by the Great Eastern Railway as a competitor to Spitalfields Market in the City of London, the market closed in 1991 and consolidated at the New Spitalfields Market in Leyton. The site is now home to Stratford Market Depot.

== History ==
Stratford Langthorne Abbey, a Cistercian monastic abbey was founded in 1135 on the site. The abbey survived until the dissolution of the monasteries in 1538. In 1879, the Great Eastern Railway opened a new wholesale fruit and vegetable market at Stratford to rival Spitalfields Market, and the nearby railway station was renamed Stratford Market on 1 November 1880. To serve this market, a large goods depot was located south of the station on the western side of the railway line. Additionally, a coal depot served the Patent Victoria Stone Works.

In 1907 the market depot became the centre for the distribution of bananas in London with Fyffes and Elders both having depots on the site. The railway depot closed in the 1960s although the sidings were used for storage of withdrawn rolling stock for a number of years afterwards.

After 112 years, the wholesale market closed on 13 May 1991, moving to a new purpose built site in Leyton - New Spitalfields Market.

== Today ==
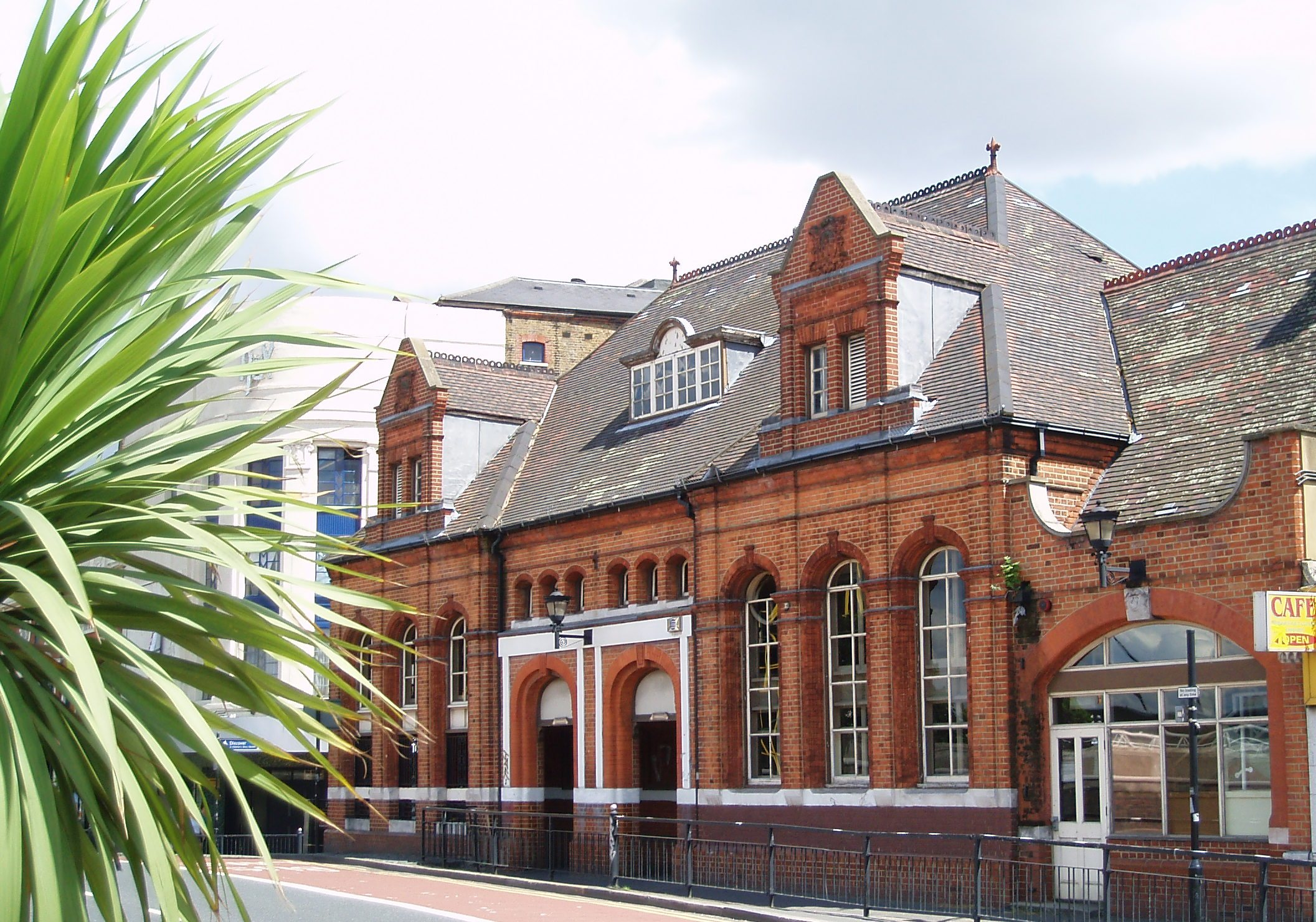
The former Stratford Market station

The market buildings and sidings were demolished in 1992 to make way for the Stratford Market Jubilee line depot. To commemorate the former use of the site as a fruit and vegetable market, the new facility was named after the old market. Other areas of the site are in industrial and commercial use. The nearby railway station reopened as part of the Docklands Light Railway in 2011 as Stratford High Street.
