= Abbey Road DLR station =

Docklands Light Railway station

Abbey Road
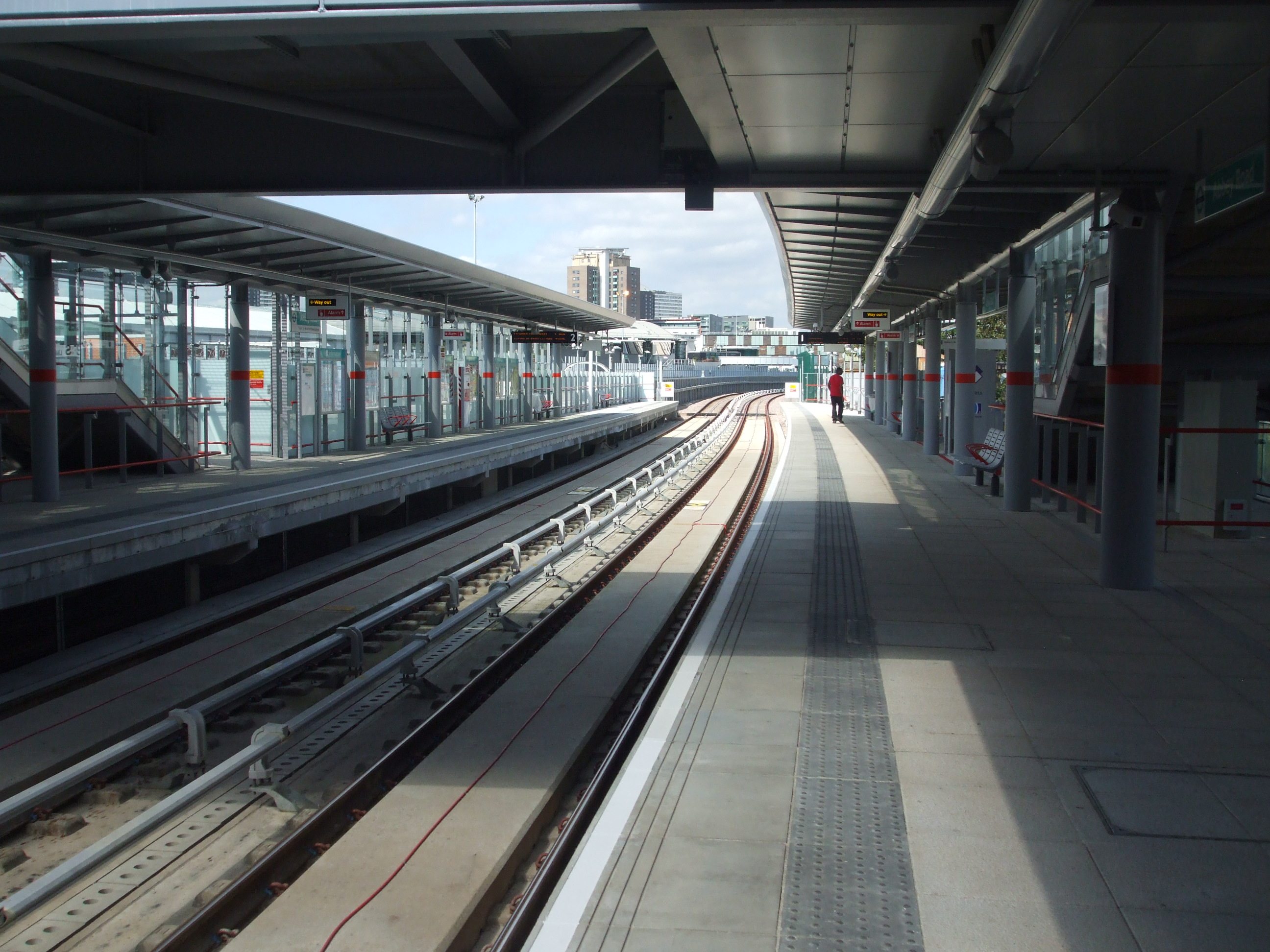
- Platforms looking north in 2011

General information
- Location: West Ham, Newham
- Coordinates: 51.5325°N 0.0037°E
- Owner: Transport for London
- Manager: Docklands Light Railway
- Platforms: 2

Construction
- Structure type: At-grade
- Accessible: Yes

Other information
- Status: Unstaffed
- Fare zone: 2 and 3
- Website: Official website

History
- Opened: 31 August 2011

Passengers

DLR annual entry and exit
- 2021: ▼0.796 million
- 2022: ▲1.250 million
- 2023: ▲1.340 million
- 2024: ▼1.24 million
- 2025: ▲1.29 million
Location
- Location in Newham

Abbey Road DLR station is a Docklands Light Railway station in West Ham in the London Borough of Newham, in east London, England. It is located on the Stratford International extension of the Docklands Light Railway.

== History ==
The station is built on the original route of the Eastern Counties and Thames Junction Railway which opened between Stratford and Canning Town stations in 1846. The line became part of what is now known as the North London line in 1979. The Eastern Counties and Thames Junction Railway had four tracks over this section of route. The western pair were redeveloped as part of an extension to the London Underground's Jubilee line in 1999 and the eastern pair, which carried the North London Line service, were cut back at Stratford in 2006. The tracks were converted for use as part of the Docklands Light Railway and the station was constructed with two platforms. It opened on 31 August 2011, over a year late, providing the community new links to the rest of London.

== Design ==
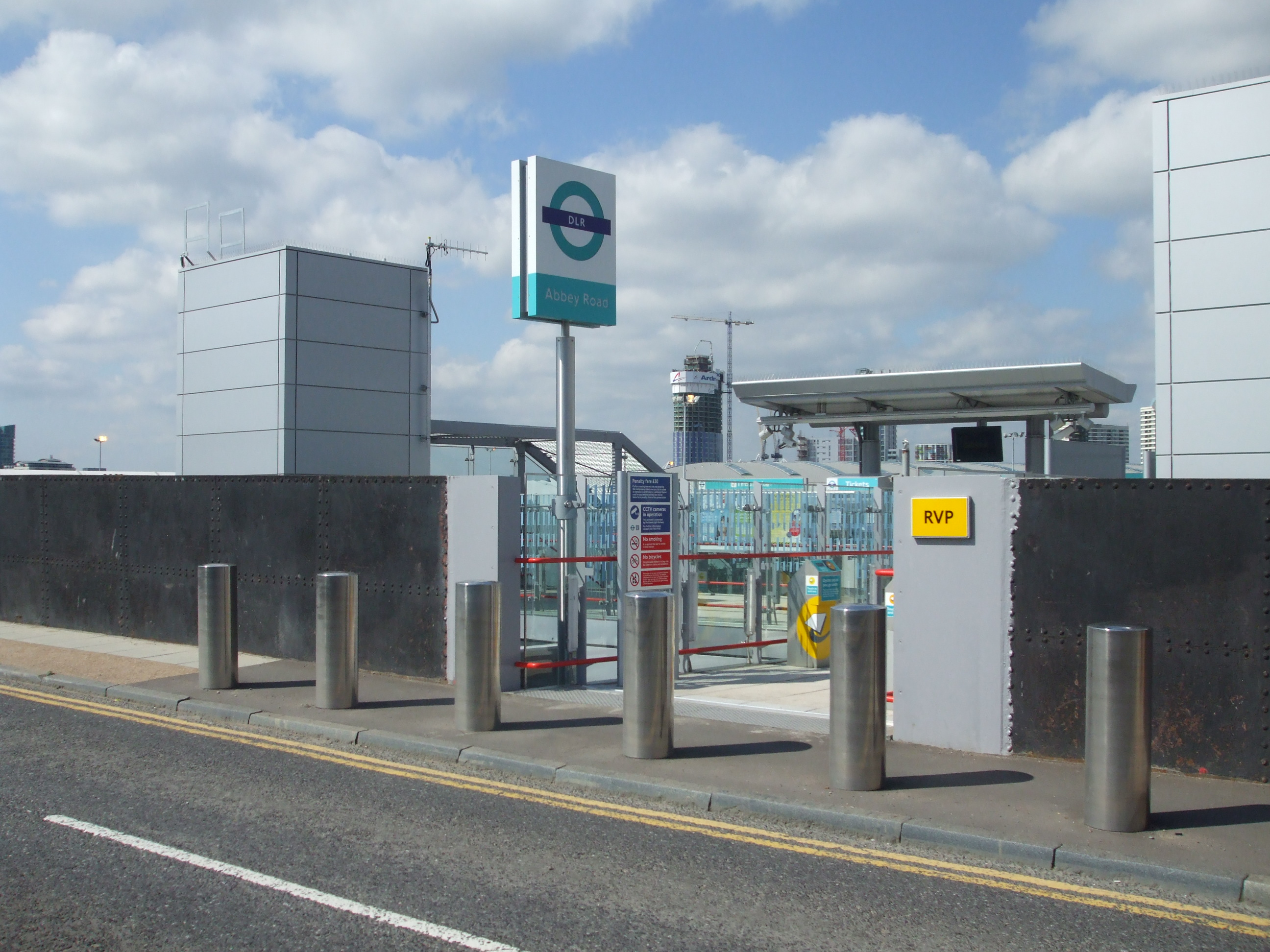
Abbey Road south entrance.

Abbey Road station utilises a simple platform setup with two tracks. At the southern section of each platform are lifts and stairs for access to a skybridge to connect the two platforms. The eastern end of this bridge has a concourse that runs to the northern side of Abbey Road, where passengers can exit the station. The Jubilee line passes through this station but does not have platforms here.

Along with Stratford High Street, Stratford and Star Lane – the station has artwork Places of Exchange by Scottish artist Toby Paterson – tessellated patterns inspired by the local area, etched into the glass panels of the station.

== Location ==
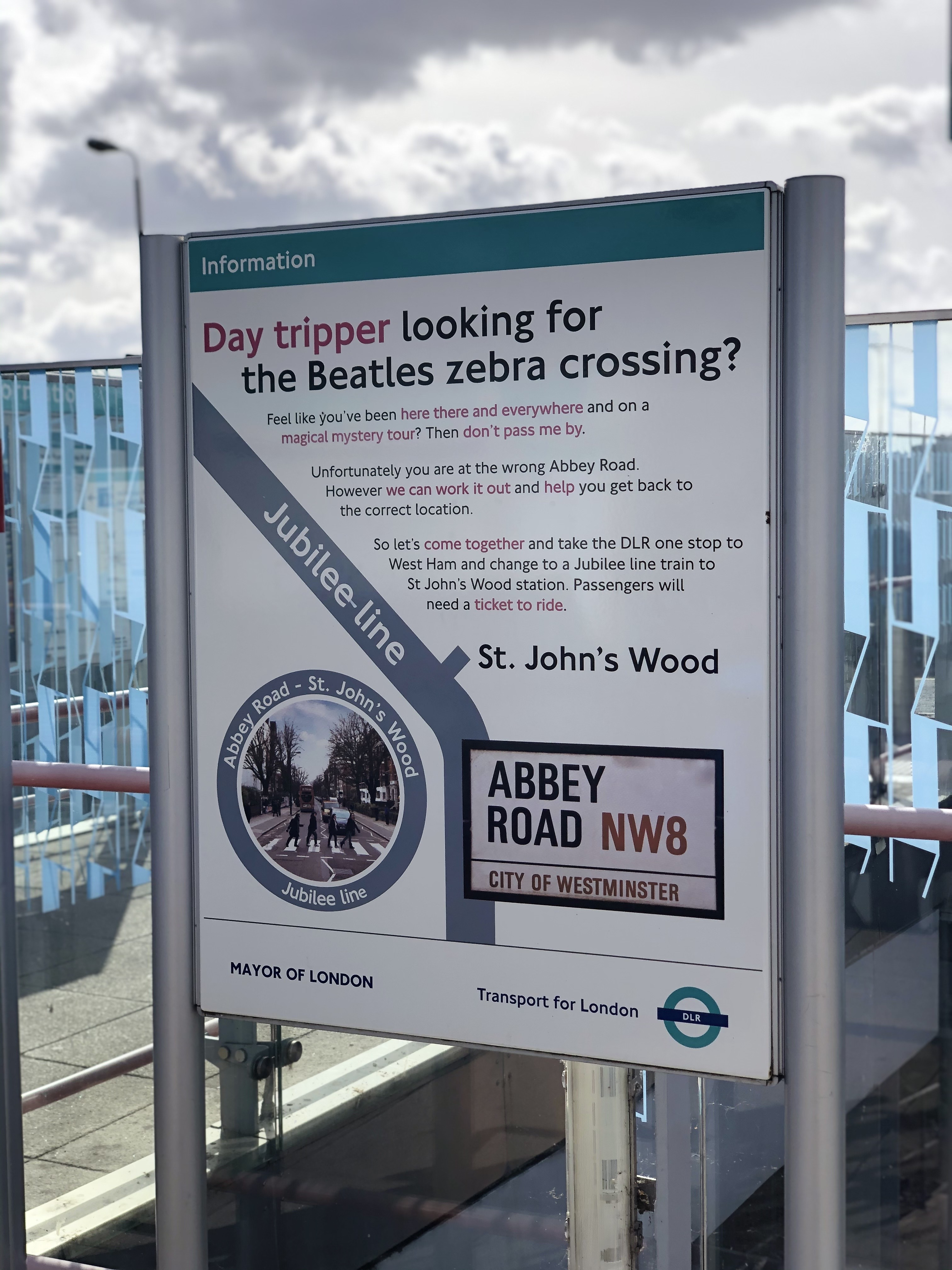
A sign telling travellers heading to the Beatles landmark that they are at the wrong station. The sign is filled with Beatles references.

The area between Canning Town and Stratford has been identified for major regeneration and new development as part of the Lower Lea Valley. The street that it serves is named after the nearby Stratford Langthorne Abbey.

The station is not located near the better-known Abbey Road of Beatles fame, which is located in Westminster 13 km (8 mi) to the west, with the celebrated zebra crossing near St John's Wood tube station. Signs directing travellers to the right station are posted, complete with references to The Beatles' hits — taking the DLR south to West Ham (or Canning Town) and changing to the Jubilee line to get to St John's Wood.

The station is on Abbey Road in West Ham, which is a busy road linking the A118, A11 and A12 at Bow and the A1011 and A112 at West Ham, avoiding Stratford town centre.

== Services ==
The typical off-peak service in trains per hour from Abbey Road is:

- 6 tph to Stratford International
- 6 tph to Woolwich Arsenal

Additional services call at the station during the peak hours, increasing the service to up to 8 tph in each direction.

Preceding station	DLR	Following station
Stratford High Street towards Stratford International	Docklands Light Railway	West Ham towards Woolwich Arsenal

== See also ==
- Abbey Road, London, a road in North London best known for the Beatles album, Abbey Road, and the Abbey Road Studios
