= Uniform Distribution and Accreditation Centre =

- Interactive map of the Uniform Distribution and Accreditation Centre area
- Former names: Canning Town Glass Works
- Alternative names: UDAC

General information
- Status: Demolished
- Type: Warehouse
- Location: Canning Town, 101 Stephenson Street, Canning Town, London, E16 4SA, London, United Kingdom
- Coordinates: 51°31′16.62″N 0°0′13.15″E
- Completed: 1925
- Opened: 1925
- Demolished: 2012

The Uniform Distribution and Accreditation Centre or UDAC was a facility of the London 2012 Summer Olympics, at 101 Stephenson Street in Canning Town, London. It was opposite the Star Lane Docklands Light Railway station.

== History and design ==
The UDAC was a converted brick warehouse. It was built around 1925 and used to be the offices of the Canning Town Glass Works. In 2012, it was decorated with London 2012 banners and flags. Outside the UDAC was an office where people who had gone through the accreditation process could collect an Oyster card. On 27 April 2012, the UDAC was officially opened by Lord Coe and Paul Deighton.

== Usage ==
The UDAC was the location for Olympic and Paralympic staff and volunteers to collect their accreditation passes and uniforms. It also had an area to take photographs for accreditation passes. The uniform area consisted of changing rooms where many volunteers collected their uniforms; they criticised the UDAC for not having mirrors there, which the London Organising Committee of the Olympic and Paralympic Games (LOCOG) said was intended to speed up the process. On 27 June, Prime Minister David Cameron visited the facility where he assisted the volunteers working at the UDAC. He was heckled while giving a speech to the volunteers.

== After the Olympics ==
The UDAC was under the control of London Organising Committee of the Olympic and Paralympic Games (LOCOG) until September 2012 when they finished using it after the 2012 Paralympic Games. On 17 September, Newham London Borough Council approved plans to demolish the facility and construct a series of industrial buildings in its place, intended as part of London's Olympic legacy.
