= Star Lane DLR station =

Docklands Light Railway station

Star Lane
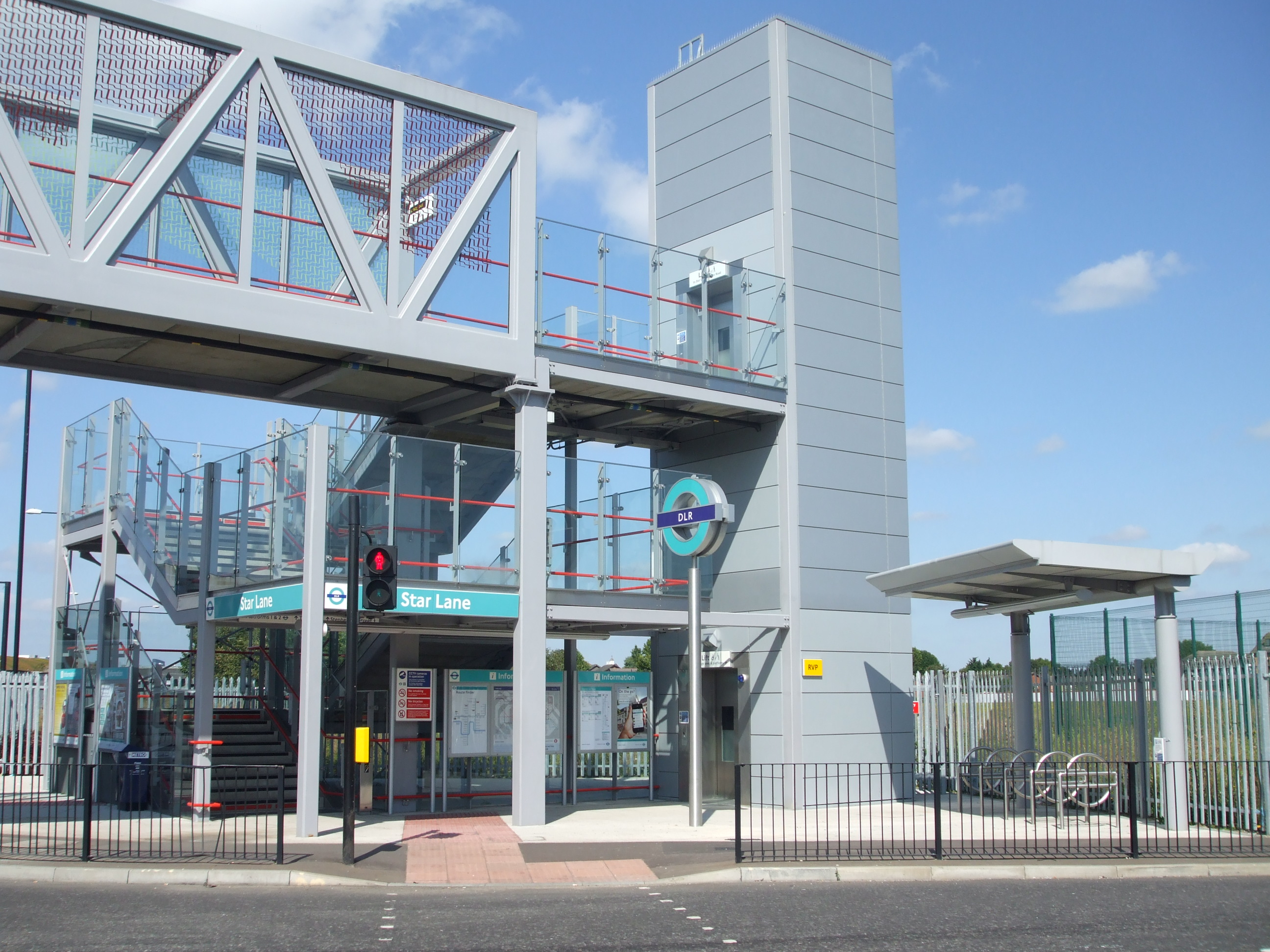
- Eastern entrance

General information
- Location: Canning Town, Newham
- Coordinates: 51.5207°N 0.0042°E
- Owned by: Transport for London
- Managed by: Docklands Light Railway
- Platforms: 2

Construction
- Structure type: At-grade
- Accessible: Yes

Other information
- Status: Unstaffed
- Fare zone: 2 and 3
- Website: Official website

History
- Opened: 31 August 2011

Passengers

DLR annual entry and exit
- 2020: ▼1.136 million
- 2021: ▼0.971 million
- 2022: ▲1.470 million
- 2023: ▲1.690 million
- 2024: ▼1.51 million
Location
- Location in Newham

Star Lane is a Docklands Light Railway (DLR) station in Canning Town, east London. Located on the Stratford International extension of the Docklands Light Railway between Stratford and Canning Town, it opened on 31 August 2011.

== History ==
The station is on the original route of the Eastern Counties and Thames Junction Railway, which opened between Stratford and Canning Town in 1846. The line became part of, what is now known as, the North London line in 1979. The Eastern Counties and Thames Junction Railway had four tracks over this section of route. The western pair were redeveloped as part of an extension to the London Underground's Jubilee line in 1999 and the eastern pair, which carried the North London Line, were cut back at Stratford in 2006. The tracks were converted for use as part of the Docklands Light Railway and the station was constructed with two platforms.

The station was originally to be called Cody Road station, and was shown on some maps as such prior to opening.

== Design ==
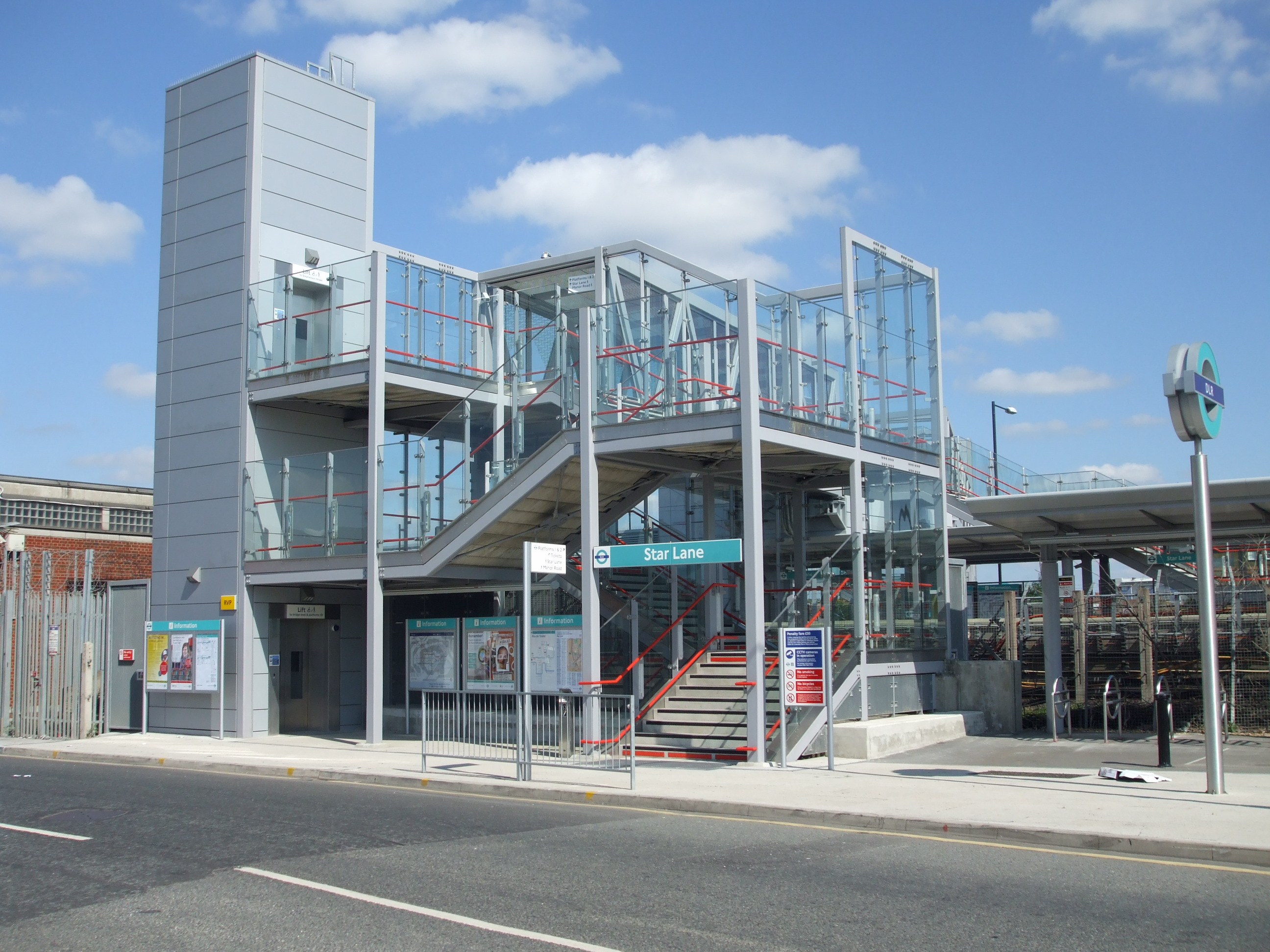
Western entrance

The station is an island platform under a footbridge. Some junction changes around Manor Road and Star Lane have been implemented with a small amount of land taken on the corner of Star Primary School. A new pedestrian crossing on Star Lane has been installed. The footbridge, known locally as "the peggy leggy steps", has been replaced.

Along with Stratford High Street, Stratford and Abbey Road, the station features the artwork Places of Exchange by Scottish artist Toby Paterson - tessellated patterns inspired by the local area, etched into the glass panels of the station.

== Location ==
Star Lane DLR Station serves the Star Lane area in North Canning Town. It is located just north of the Canning Interchange which includes the bus station, Jubilee line, other DLR services and the road junction where the A13, A1011 and A124 all meet. In 2012, it was opposite the Uniform Distribution and Accreditation Centre for the Olympics.

== Services ==
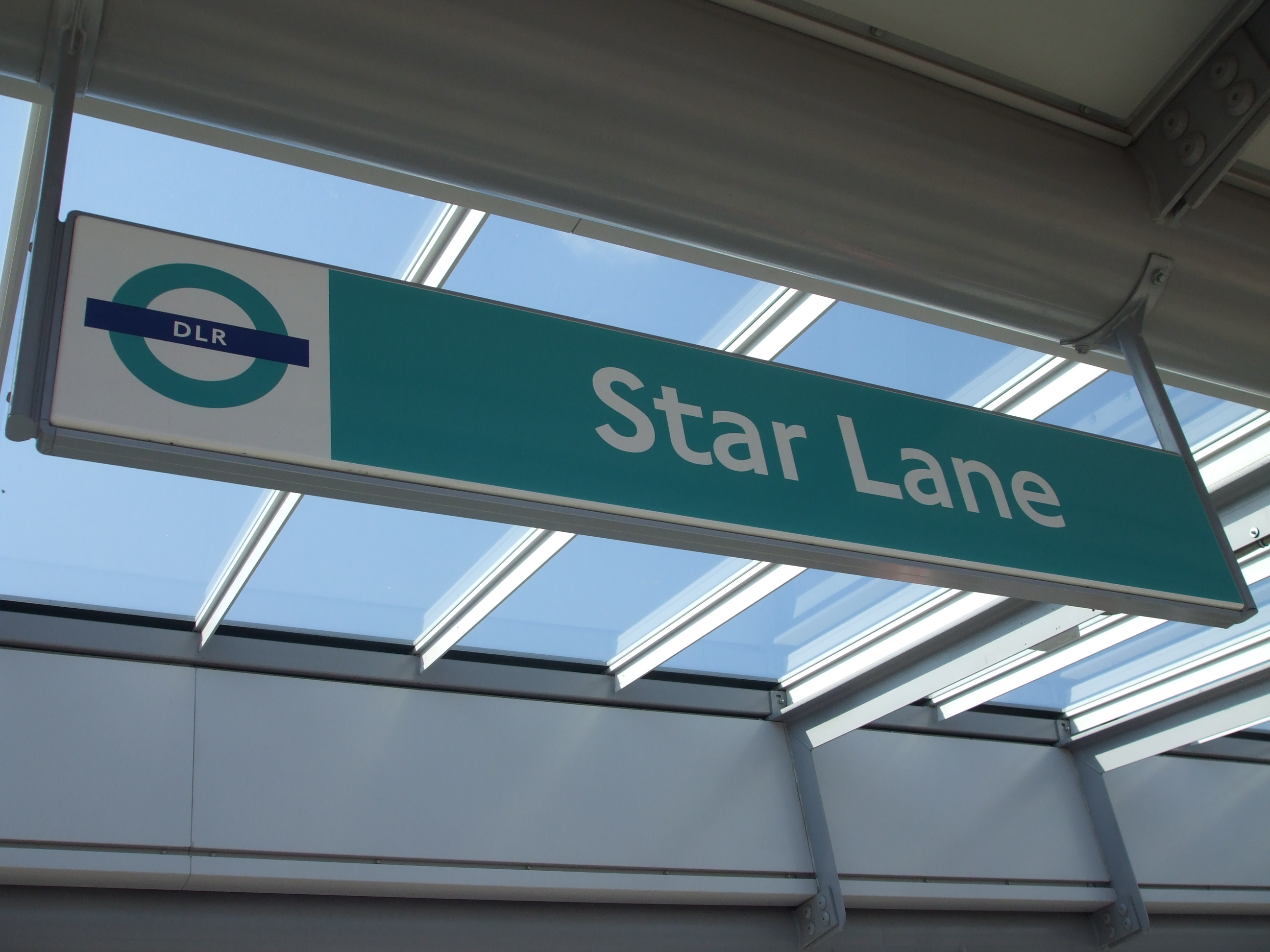
Platform signage

The typical off-peak service in trains per hour from Star Lane is:

- 6 tph to Stratford International
- 6 tph to Woolwich Arsenal

Additional services call at the station during the peak hours, increasing the service to up to 8 tph in each direction.

Preceding station	DLR	Following station
West Ham towards Stratford International	Docklands Light Railway	Canning Town towards Woolwich Arsenal

== Connections ==
London Buses routes 276 and 323 serve the station.
