= Stratford Langthorne Abbey =

Cistercian abbey in Stratford, England

Coordinates: 51°32′00″N 00°00′00″W

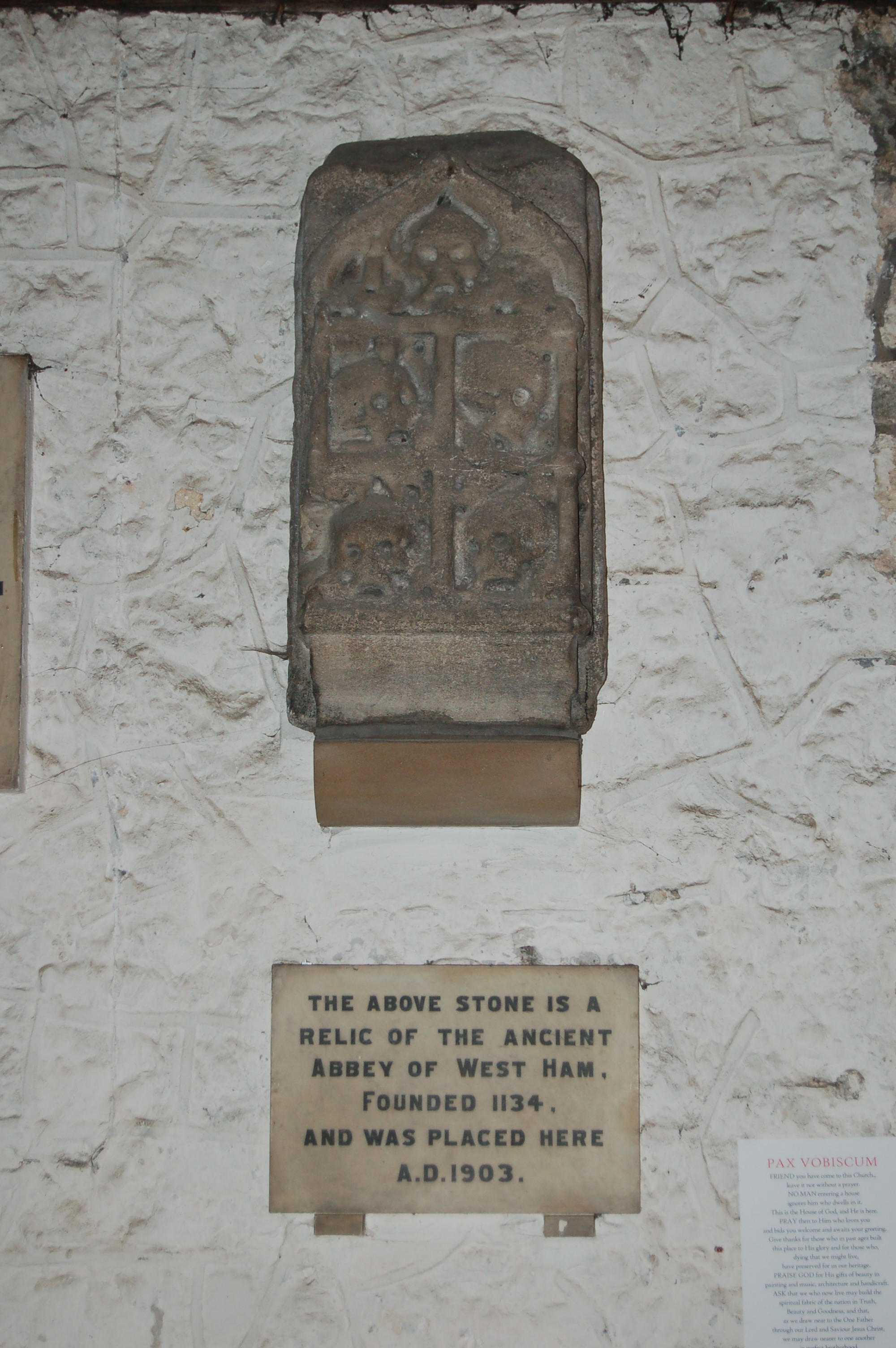
There are few traces of Stratford Langthorne Abbey. Shown is the keystone from the charnel house door, now in the parish church of West Ham.

Stratford Langthorne Abbey, or the Abbey of St Mary's, Stratford Langthorne was a Cistercian monastery founded in 1135 at Stratford Langthorne — then Essex but now Stratford in the London Borough of Newham. The Abbey, also known as West Ham Abbey due to its location in the parish of West Ham, was one of the largest Cistercian abbeys in England, possessing 1,500 acres (6.07 km^{2}) of local land, controlling over 20 manors throughout Essex. The head of the community was known as the Abbot of West Ham.

The Abbey was self-sufficient for its needs and wealthy besides; some of this wealth came from the ecclesiastic mills grinding wheat for local bakers to supply bread to the City of London. This later led to competition with the Guild of Bakers, who sought powers to levy a toll on loaves entering the City at Whitechapel.

== History ==
=== Foundation ===
In a charter dated 25 July 1135, William de Montfichet granted the monks all his lordship of (West) Ham, 11 acres (44,515 m^{2}) of meadow, two mills by the causeway of Stratford, his wood of Buckhurst and the tithe of his pannage. The abbey was dedicated in honour of St Mary. The Abbey was a daughter house of Savigny Abbey, and in 1218 the General Chapter ruled that visiting members of the order could only spend three days at the Abbey's hospitality. The following year, the rule was relaxed and monks and lay brothers could remain longer, as long as they provided their own ale and wine; and oats and hay for their horses.

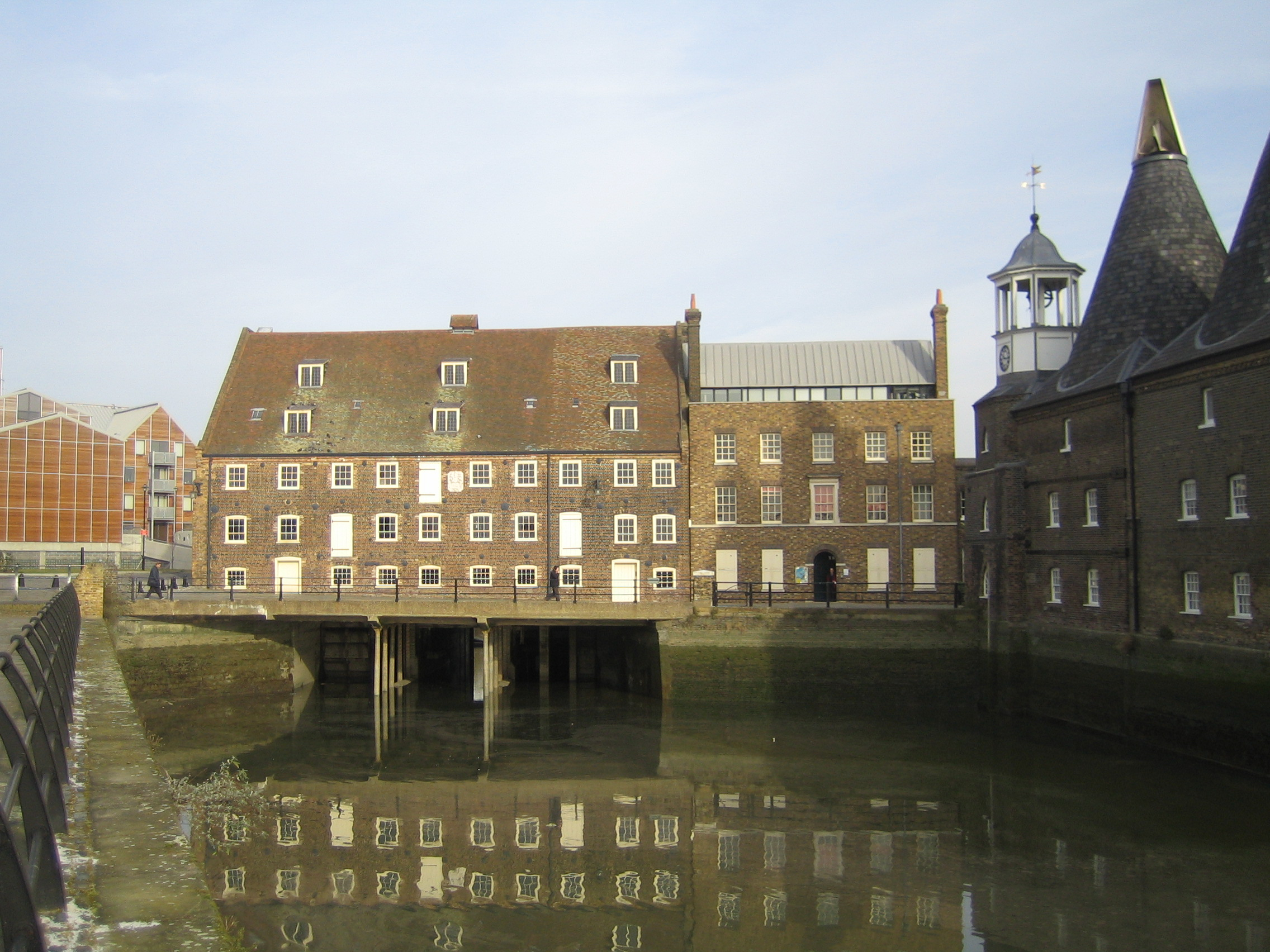
The House Mill (1776) and Miller's House at Three Mills. Shown at low tide.

The Abbey church expanded from a simple cruciform building, to one with an aisled presbytery, ambulatory and side chapels by the 13th century. The religious house was surrounded by buildings for lay brothers and hospitality. There were also workshops for brewing, shearing, weaving and tannery with farm buildings to service the extensive holdings and mills on the Bow Back Rivers. Some of these were tidal mills, like those at Three Mills. These were owned by the Abbey, but the surviving mill was built much later. During the 13th century, the abbey acquired further grants of land in Essex and beyond, including the manor of Biggin in Chadwell St Mary.

In 1267, for a time, the Abbey became the court of Henry III for the visitation of the Papal legates, and it was here that he made peace with the barons under the terms of the Dictum of Kenilworth. Subsequent monarchs visited, and the Abbey came to be both a popular retreat for the nobility and their final resting place.

Severe flooding of the Thames in 1338 saw the monks decamp to their landholdings at Great Burstead in Essex, and in 1381, the Abbey was invaded by the Peasants' Revolt and its goods removed and charters burned. It also suffered flooding at the end of the 14th century, after which the Abbey was restored by Richard II. King Edward IV was entertained in 1467, and began an annual endowment of two casks of wine for the celebration of masses, in his honour.

A small river port developed at Stratford, mentioned in the 15th century, to serve the needs of West Ham Abbey and the mills at Stratford. There is similar evidence in later centuries with specialist wharves for brick and timber, but by 1920 the dock was filled in and factories built on the site. From 1613, extraction of water for canals and the artificial New River, supplying fresh water to the city from Hertfordshire, had caused water levels to fall in the non-navigable channels, and traditional water milling to cease.

=== Responsibility for Bow Bridge ===
In 1177, a bridge was built at Bow, to replace a ford at Old Ford. Initially, local land and Abbey Mill were given to Barking Abbey for the maintenance of the bridge, but these properties and the responsibility eventually passed to this Abbey. The Abbess of Barking and Abbot of West Ham argued about the obligation, a dispute that was settled in 1315. West Ham was to maintain the bridge and highway, but the Abbess would pay £200 annually in recompense. The Abbey's subsequent dissolution caused further lengthy litigation over maintenance of the bridge at Bow – with the successor landowners found responsible in 1691. The matter was not finally resolved until 1834, with the formation of a Turnpike Trust. The Abbey was also responsible for maintenance of the sea wall around West Ham marsh; this led to further disputes with the nearby Priory of St Leonards at Bow, when, in 1339 the Abbot attempted to put the expense on the Prioress

=== Dissolution ===
The Abbey existed until the Dissolution of the Monasteries by Henry VIII in 1538. It was the fifth largest in England – as important as its sister Abbeys at Jervaulx, Rievaulx and Fountains, all in North Yorkshire. At the Dissolution the land was granted to Sir Peter Meautas and Johanna his wife "for their true and faithful service" and the monks were all pensioned.

=== Modern history ===
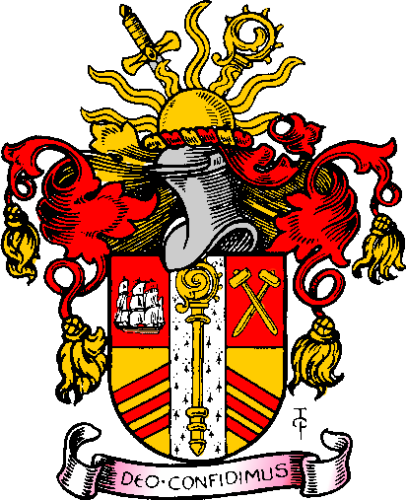
Arms of the County Borough of West Ham.

The Abbey lay between the Channelsea River and Marsh Lane (Manor Road). Nothing visible remains on the site, as local landowners took away much of the stone for their own buildings, and by 1840, the North Woolwich Railway was built through the site, and factories and Stratford Wholesale Market were established on the remaining land. A stone window and a carving featuring skulls – thought to have been over the door to the charnel house – remain in All Saints West Ham Parish Church (dating from about 1180). The Great Gate of the abbey survived in Baker's Row until 1825.

None of the abbey's buildings remain, but in the early 1990s archaeological investigations were carried out between 1993–94 on land cleared for the new Stratford Market Depot, part of the Jubilee Line Extension. 647 burials were excavated from the Cistercian cemetery and reburied at Mount St. Bernard Abbey in Leicestershire. Excavation continues on the site as the remaining former factories are redeveloped. The latest, at Bakers Row, was in early 2008 and identified the former gatehouse of the Abbey - to the north east of the Abbey Church and defining the eastern edge of the precinct. This area, where former council stables were situated, is now protected from further development by scheduled monument status and a major community garden designed by artists Karen Guthrie and Nina Pope of the artists' collective Somewhere has been created on the site by the "Friends of Abbey Gardens".

The coat of arms of the Abbey can be seen over the doorway to the Old Court House, in Tramway Avenue (Stratford). The chevrons from this device, originally from the arms of the Mountfitchet family, together with an abbot's crozier were incorporated into the arms of the former County Borough of West Ham in 1887. The same arms were adopted by the new London Borough of Newham in 1965. The Abbey is commemorated by two roads in the district, Abbey Lane and Abbey Road. In addition, Langthorne Street was formerly situated a little north of the Abbey site, running between Chapel Street and West Ham Lane. The street was devastated by enemy action during the Second World War, and the site subsequently disappeared beneath new development in the late 1960s.

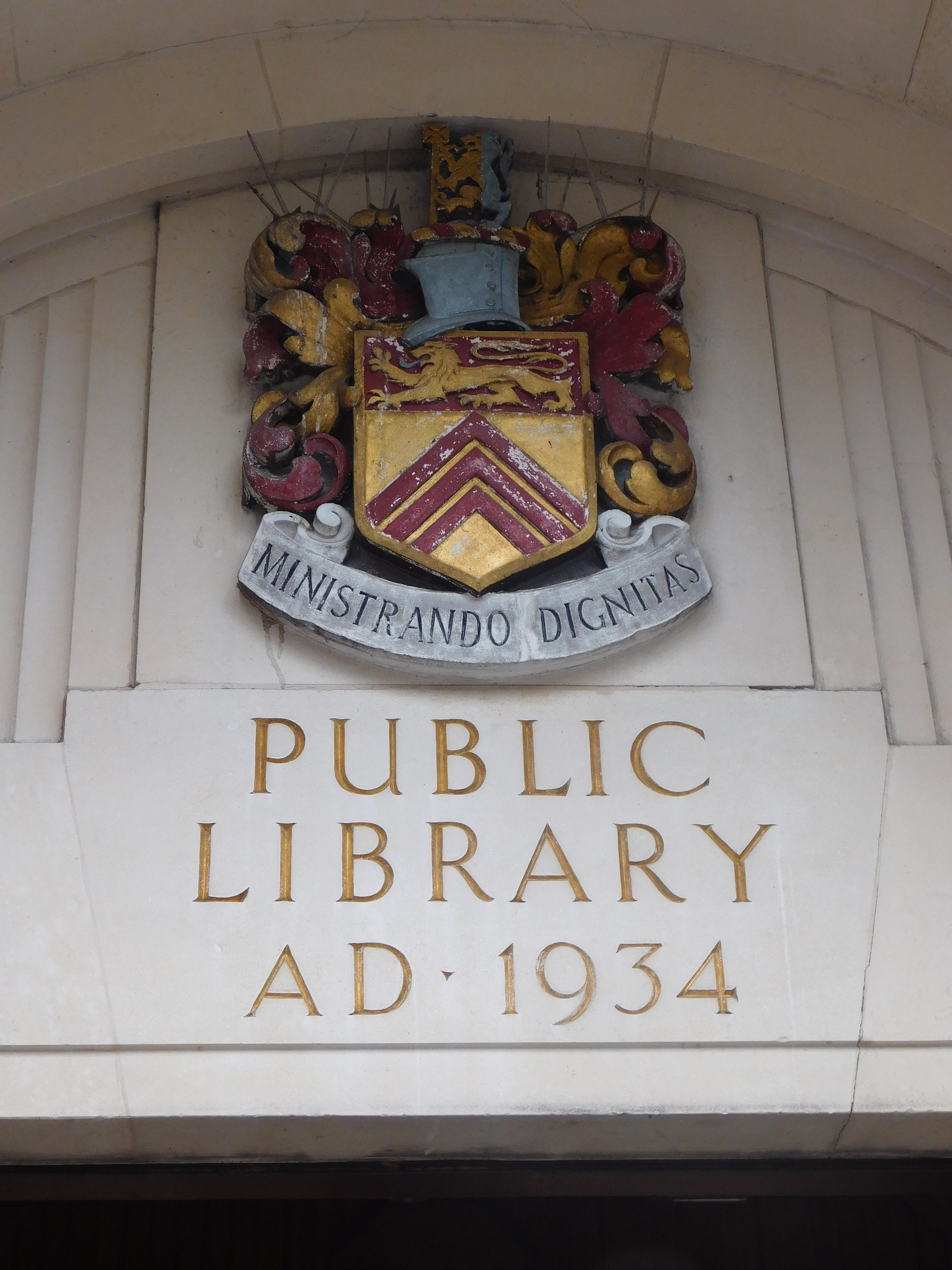
Arms of Municipal Borough of Leyton

The Langthorne chevrons were also incorporated into the arms of the former Municipal Borough of Leyton, now part of the London Borough of Waltham Forest, because the abbey held considerable demesne lands there. Langthorne Road and the former Langthorne Hospital in Leytonstone commemorated the abbey's influence in the area.

== Burials at the Abbey ==
The excavations recovered 647 burials from the church and the external cemetery to the north and north-east. Analysis of the skeletons indicated an overwhelmingly male cemetery population, as might be expected of a Cistercian monastery, but a few infants, children and women were present in all areas used for burial. Documented burials at the abbey include:

- John de Bohun, 5th Earl of Hereford

== Estates held ==
Manors held by the abbey included:

- Land in West Ham, Essex
- Land in Leyton, Essex
- Land in Great Burstead, Essex.
- The manor of Biggin in Chadwell St Mary, Essex
- Monkhams, in Woodford, Essex.
