= New Spitalfields Market =

Fruit and vegetable market in London

Coordinates: 51.556689°N 0.019526°W

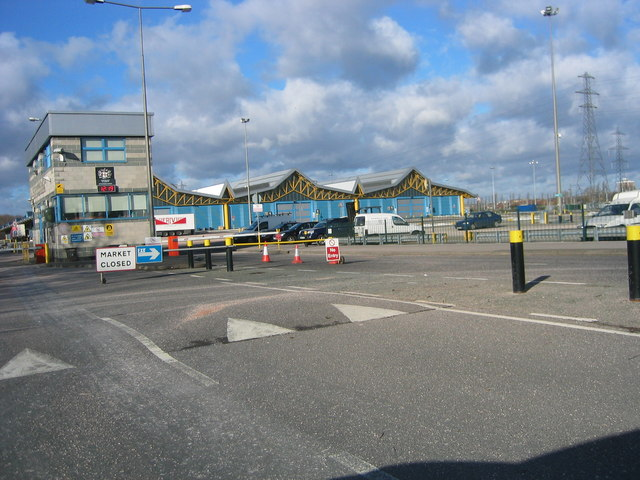
- Interactive map of the New Spitalfields Market area

General information
- Type: Wholesale market
- Location: Leyton, London Borough of Waltham Forest, London, England
- Construction started: 1987
- Completed: 1991
- Opened: May 1991
- Owner: City of London Corporation

Technical details
- Floor area: 31 acres (13 ha)

Other information
- Facilities: 115 trading units, cold storage, ripening rooms, parking, offices, catering supply units

Website
- Official website

New Spitalfields Market is a fruit and vegetable market on a 31-acre (13 ha) site in Leyton, London Borough of Waltham Forest. Located in East London, the market is owned and administered by the City of London Corporation. The market is Europe's leading horticultural market specialising in exotic fruit and vegetables - and the largest revenue earning wholesale market in the UK.

== History ==
It had previously been located at Spitalfields Market just off Bishopsgate, on the east side of the City of London in the London Borough of Tower Hamlets. Due to traffic congestion, lack of space for parking lorries, as well as out of date market buildings (e.g. poor refrigeration facilities) - the market was relocated out of the Tower Hamlets in the early 1990s. This followed the move of Covent Garden Market and Billingsgate Fish Market out of the city centre. The new, purpose-built location in Leyton opened in May 1991.

The wholesale fruit and vegetable market at Stratford Market - founded in 1879 by the Great Eastern Railway as a competitor to Spitalfields - also closed and consolidated at the New Spitalfields site. The old market on the edge of the city was subsequently regenerated, becoming Old Spitalfields Market - with a range of public markets as well as independent local stores and restaurants.

== The market today ==
The market hall houses 115 trading units for wholesalers dealing in fruit, vegetables and flowers. Modern facilities in the market hall include cold storage rooms, ripening rooms and racking for palletised produce. The site has extensive parking facilities for customers, delivery vehicles and market personnel.

There are four separate buildings providing modern self-contained units for catering supply companies. Over 9,688 square feet (900 m^{2}) of office space is also provided, and there are five ancillary accommodation units with cafes, toilets and maintenance facilities. The services of a diesel/propane supplier, specialist pallet services and forklift truck maintenance companies are also available. Security for the market is provided by the Market Constabulary.

The Old River Lea runs on the western edge of the site.

== Future ==
In early 2019, the City of London Corporation's main decision-making body, the Court of Common Council, proposed that Billingsgate Fish Market, New Spitalfields Market and Smithfield Market should move to a new consolidated site in Dagenham Dock. A formal planning application was made in June 2020, and received outline permission in March 2021.

In November 2024, the Court of Common Council announced it did not intend to proceed with these plans as they were no longer economically viable but, in December 2025, the Corporation and the Greater London Authority agreed to relocate both Billingsgate and Smithfield markets at Albert Island east of London City Airport in Newham. New Spitalfields Market was unaffected by the decision and would continue as a key London hub for wholesale fruit and vegetable produce.

== See also ==
- List of markets in London
