= Old Spitalfields Market =

Covered market in London

Coordinates: 51°31′10″N 0°4′31″W

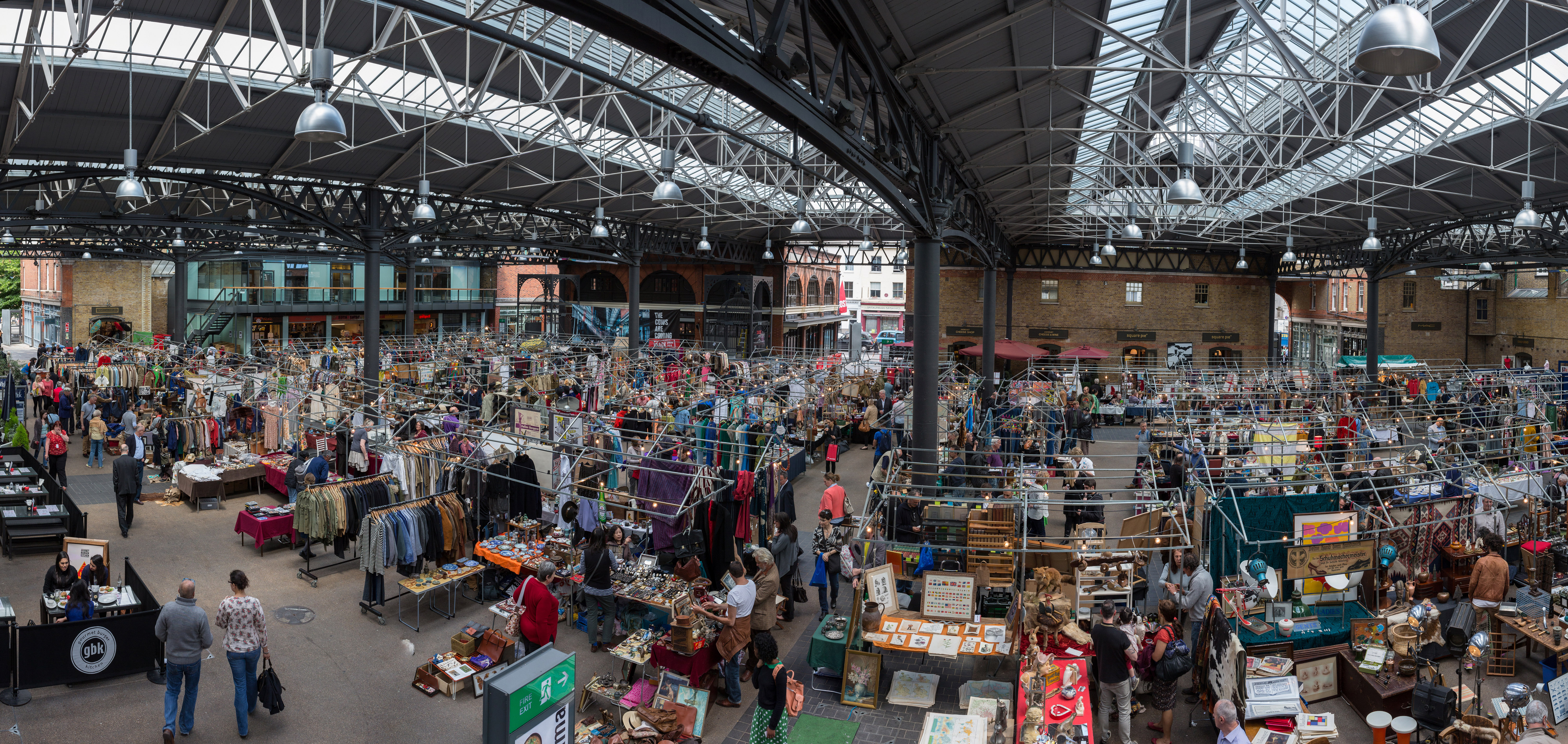
Old Spitalfields Market

Old Spitalfields Market is a covered market in Spitalfields, London. There has been a market on the site for over 350 years. In 1991 it gave its name to New Spitalfields Market in Leyton, where fruit and vegetables are now traded. In 2005, a regeneration programme resulted in the new public spaces: Bishops Square and Crispin Place, which are now part of the modern Spitalfields Market. A range of public markets runs daily, with independent local stores and restaurants - as well as new office developments.

It is situated in the London Borough of Tower Hamlets, just outside the City of London. The closest London Underground and mainline railway station is Liverpool Street.

== Historic market ==
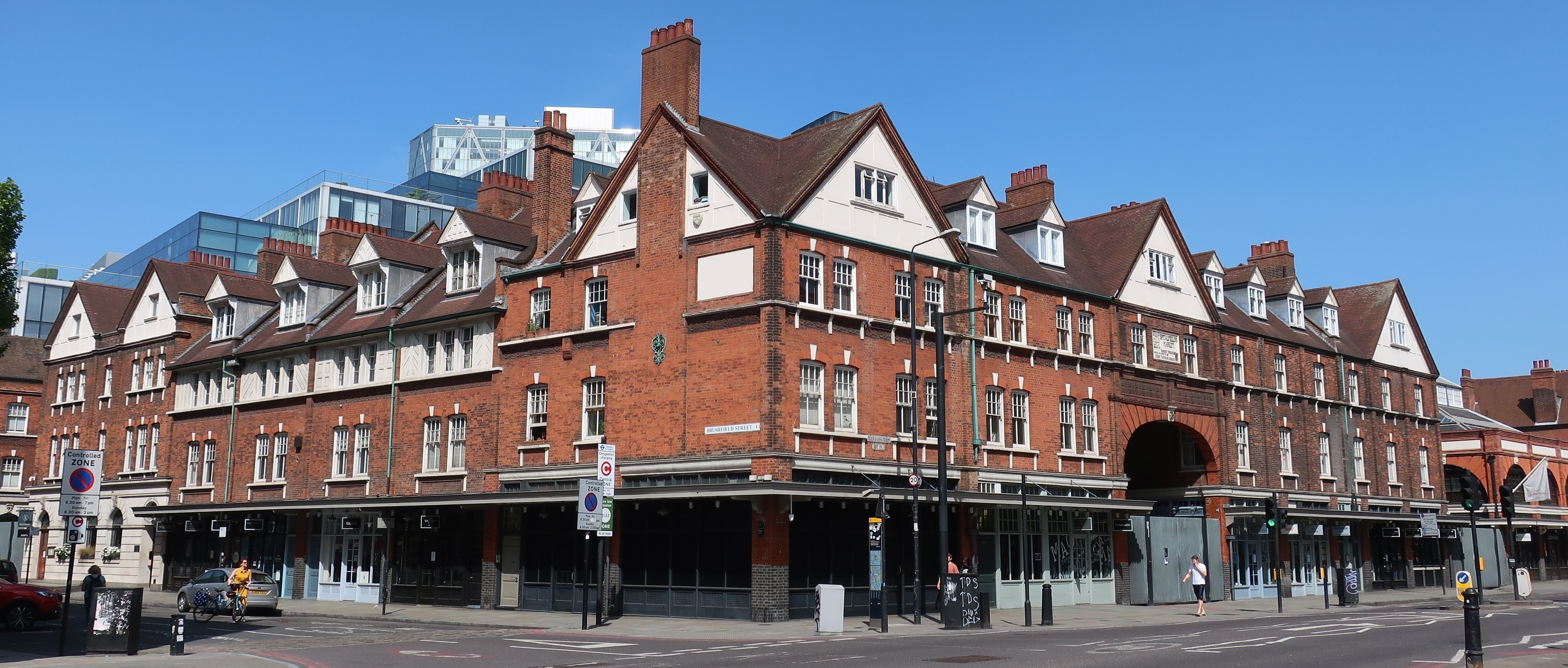
South-east corner of the Horner Buildings, constructed 1887

There has been a market on the site since 1638 when King Charles I gave a licence for flesh, fowl and roots to be sold on Spittle Fields, which was then a rural area on the eastern outskirts of London. After the rights to a market had seemingly lapsed during the time of the Commonwealth, the market was re-founded in 1682 by King Charles II in order to feed the burgeoning population of a new suburb of London.

Market buildings were sited on the rectangular patch of open ground which retained the name Spittle Fields: demarcated by Crispin Street to the west, Lamb Street to the north, Red Lion Street (later subsumed into Commercial Street) to the east and Paternoster Row (later known as Brushfield Street) to the south. The existing buildings were constructed between 1885 and 1893 to the designs of George Campbell Sherrin. They were commissioned by Robert Horner, the last private owner of the market, and remain known as the Horner Buildings.

The market was acquired by the City of London Corporation in 1920, to serve as a wholesale market. It was extended westward to Steward Street in 1926, destroying the northern extensions of Crispin Street and Gun Street in the process. The Cinema Museum in London holds extensive film of the market and its refrigeration systems in use between 1928 and 1930.

In 1991 the wholesale fruit and vegetable market moved to New Spitalfields Market, Leyton, and the original site became known as Spitalfields Market.

The market stalls were redesigned by architects Foster and Partners for Old Spitalfields Market in October 2017.

== Modern market ==
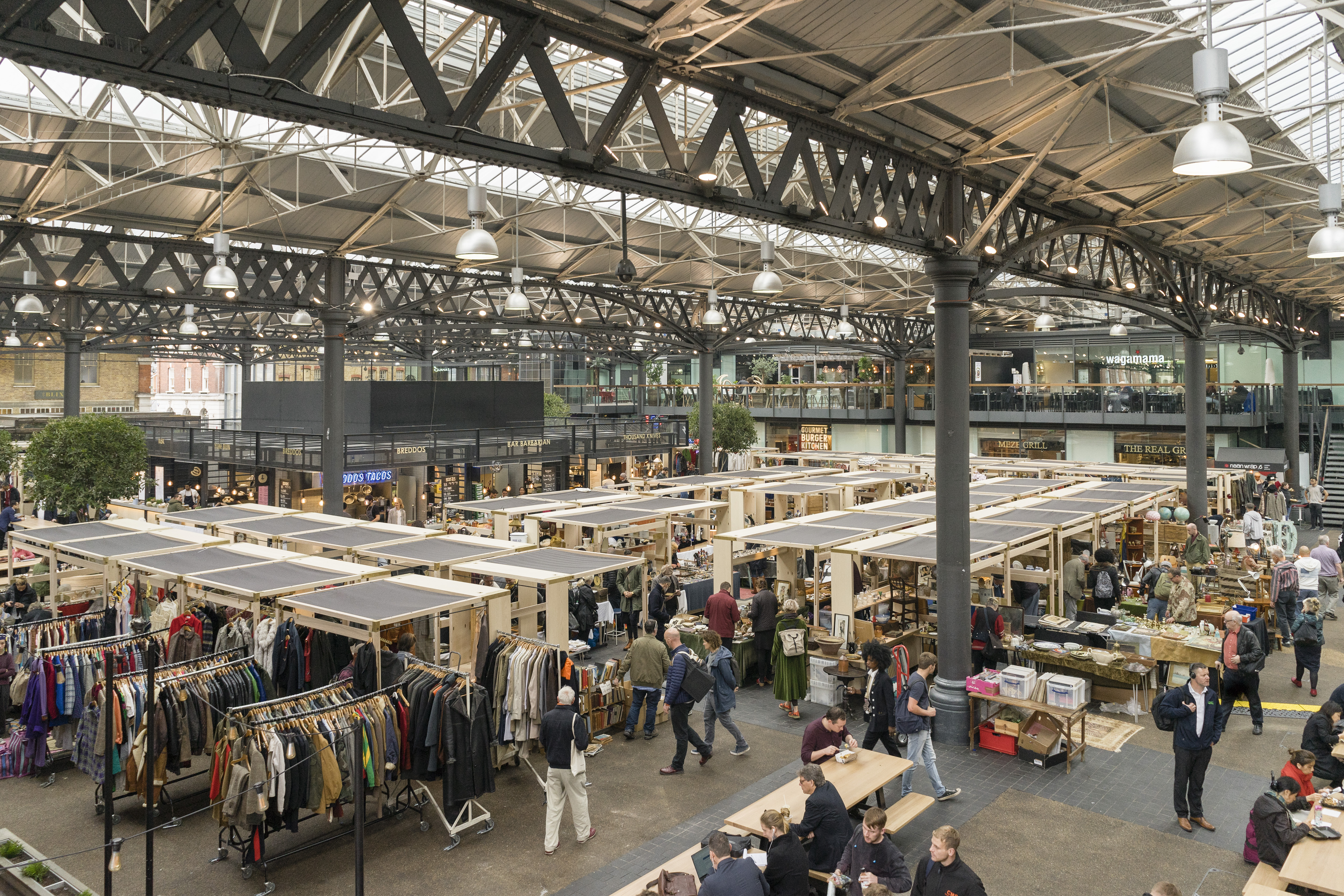
Old Spitalfields Market 2018

Being at the centre of a revival in the area, the eastern end of Spitalfields retained its old architecture in Horner Square and Horner Buildings, which are Grade II listed. The Victorian buildings and the market hall and roof have been restored, with the market square a centre for fashion, arts and crafts, food and general goods. Opening seven days a week, the area is run as two adjacent marketplaces: Old Spitalfields Market to the east, and the 1926 extension of Spitalfields Market to the west.

In the late 20th century, there was a dispute between the owners, the City of London Corporation and local residents about the redevelopment of the 1926 market extension at the western end. Following this a Norman Foster-designed office block surrounded the western side of the site, after two-thirds of the historic market was rebuilt to include restaurants, shops and an indoor arts and crafts market, called the Traders' Market.

The Gun, a pub situated to the south of the market buildings, alludes to the Tudor period, when the Old Artillery Ground in the area was used by the Honourable Artillery Company to practice with cross-bow, and later guns and artillery pieces.

At the east end, and on the other side of Commercial Street, is Christ Church, a large Nicholas Hawksmoor church.

In January 2011 Spitalfields received the "Best Private Market" award by the National Association of British Market Authorities.

Old Spitalfields Market currently holds a vintage market each Thursday, a vinyl fair some Fridays and a general arts and craft market throughout the week continuing through to the weekend.

== See also ==
- Spitalfields Market - the wholesale fruit and vegetable market which was moved to Leyton
- Leadenhall Market
- Old Billingsgate Market
- Petticoat Lane Market
- Smithfield Market
