= Preston Road tube station =

London Underground station

Preston Road
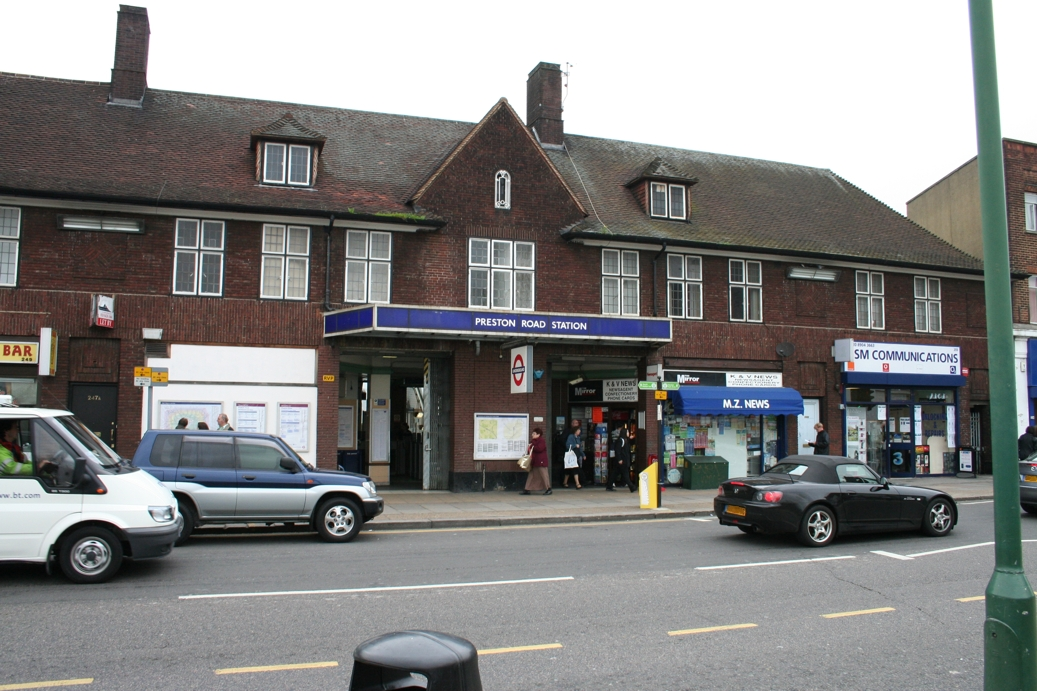
- Station entrance
- Interactive map of Preston Road

General information
- Location: Preston
- Local authority: London Borough of Brent
- Managed by: London Underground
- Number of platforms: 2
- Fare zone: 4

London Underground annual entry and exit
- 2020: ▼2.03 million
- 2021: ▼1.39 million
- 2022: ▲2.30 million
- 2023: ▲2.42 million
- 2024: ▲2.52 million

Railway companies
- Original company: Metropolitan Railway

Key dates
- 2 August 1880: Metropolitan Railway passes through here en route to Harrow
- 21 May 1908: Opened as Preston Road Halt for Uxendon and Kenton, to serve the local clay pigeon shooting site for that year's Olympic Games
- Unknown date: Renamed Preston Road
- 19 July 1908: Line electrified
- 22 November 1931: Southbound platform resited
- 3 January 1932: Northbound platform resited

Other information
- External links: TfL station info page
- Coordinates: 51.57222°N 0.29528°W

Preston Road is a London Underground station in Preston Road in the London Borough of Brent. It is on the Metropolitan line between Northwick Park and Wembley Park stations, and is in London fare zone 4. It serves the local area of Preston in Wembley and parts of Kenton.

The station is served by "all stations" trains only (northbound fast and semi-fast trains do not stop at stations between Wembley Park and Harrow-on-the-Hill).

== History ==
The Metropolitan Railway was extended from Willesden Green to Harrow on 2 August 1880, but originally there were no stations between Neasden and Harrow. A station on the eastern side of the Preston Road bridge was opened on 21 May 1908, and was originally named Preston Road Halt for Uxendon and Kenton; it was later renamed Preston Road. During 1931–32, it was re-sited on the opposite side of the road bridge, and the work was carried out in two stages: the southbound platform was re-sited on 22 November 1931, and the northbound on 3 January 1932.

== Decorations ==
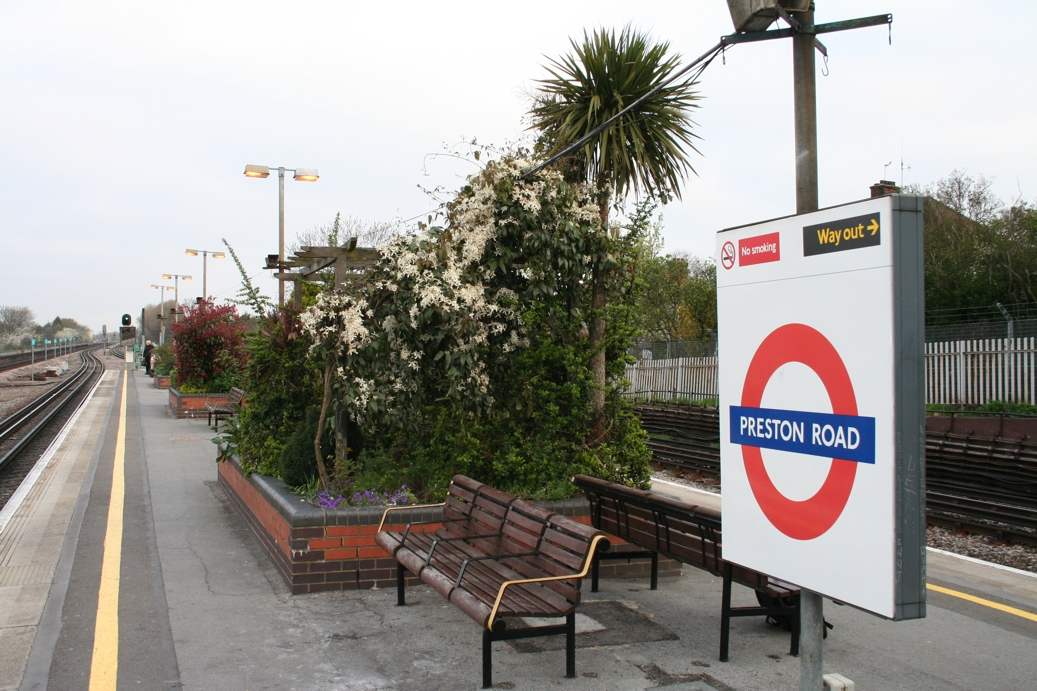
Horticultural displays on the island platform at Preston Road

The horticultural displays on the platform have won many awards over the years, but fell into disrepair for some years. With the current refurbishment of the station the floral decorations have since been revived.

== Services ==
Preston Road station is on the Metropolitan line in London fare zone 4. It is between Northwick Park to the north and Wembley Park to the south.

The off-peak service in trains per hour (tph) is:

- 2tph Northbound to Amersham (all stations)
- 2tph Northbound to Chesham (all stations)
- 8tph Northbound to Uxbridge (all stations)
- 4tph Northbound to Watford (all stations)
- 4tph Southbound to Baker Street (all stations)
- 12tph Southbound to Aldgate via Baker Street (all stations)

The peak time service in trains per hour (tph) is:

- 2tph Northbound (morning peak only) to Amersham (all stations)
- 2pth Northbound (morning peak only) to Chesham (all stations)
- 10tph Northbound to Uxbridge (all stations)
- 4tph Southbound to Baker Street (all stations)
- 12tph Southbound to Aldgate via Baker Street (all stations)

Note that during evening peaks, services to Amersham or Chesham from Preston Road or Northwick Park require a change at Harrow-on-the-Hill.

During the morning peak (06:30 to 09:30), Fast services from Amersham and Chesham run non-stop southbound only between Moor Park, Harrow-on-the-Hill and Finchley Road whilst Semi-fast services from Watford and Uxbridge run non-stop southbound only between Harrow-on-the-Hill and Finchley Road. During the evening peak (16:30–19:30), Fast and Semi-fast services, which operate northbound only call additionally at Wembley Park.

Preceding station	London Underground	Following station
Northwick Park towards Uxbridge, Amersham, Chesham or Watford	Metropolitan line	Wembley Park towards Baker Street or Aldgate

== Connections ==
London Buses routes serve the station.
