= Wembley Park tube station =

London Underground station

Wembley Park
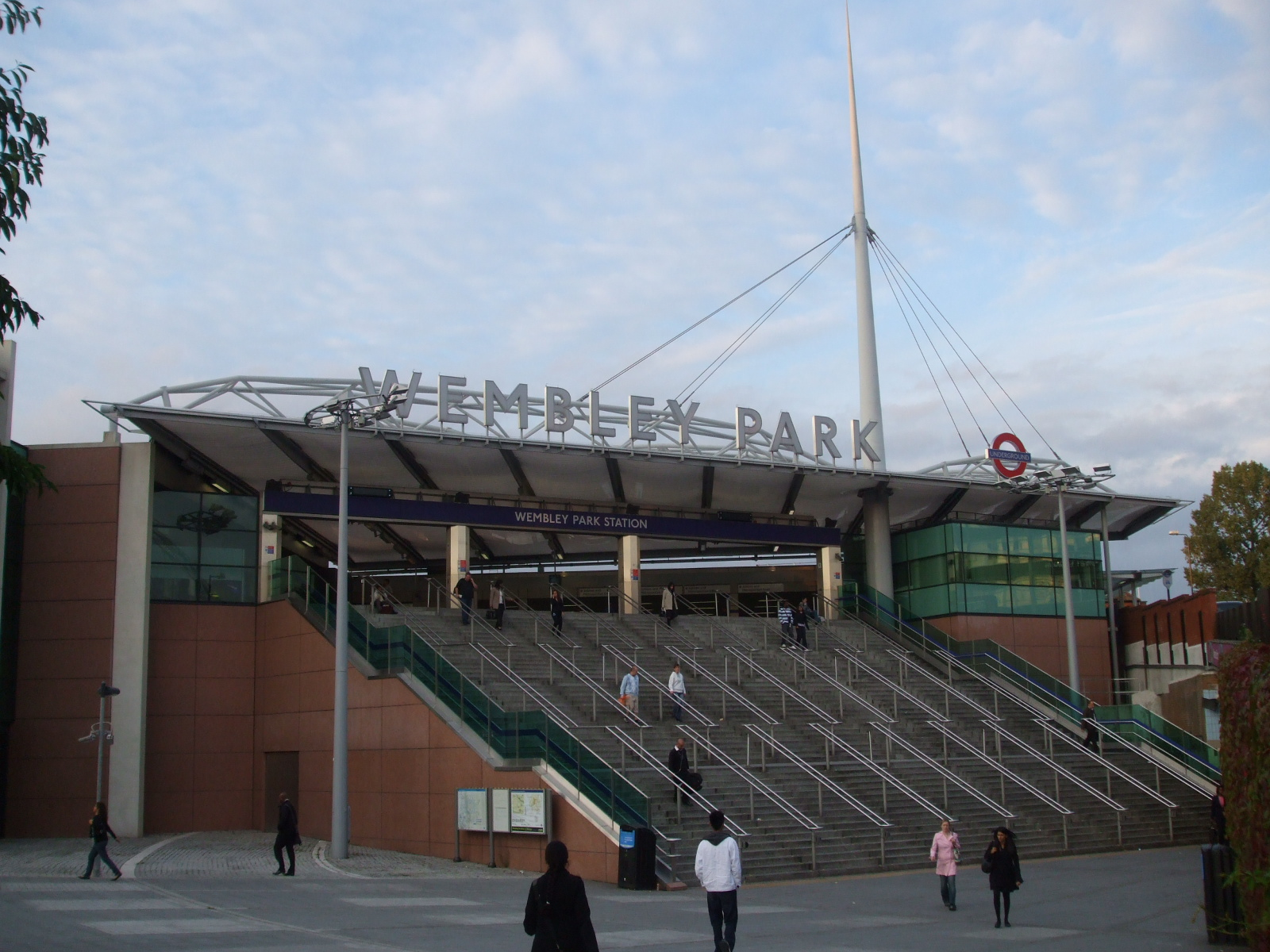
- New main entrance of the station
- Interactive map of Wembley Park

General information
- Location: Wembley Park
- Local authority: London Borough of Brent
- Managed by: London Underground
- Number of platforms: 6
- Accessible: Yes
- Fare zone: 4

London Underground annual entry and exit
- 2020: ▼8.29 million
- 2021: ▼7.89 million
- 2022: ▲15.00 million
- 2023: ▲15.51 million
- 2024: ▲16.53 million

Key dates
- 1880: Tracks laid (MR)
- 14 October 1893: Limited opening
- 12 May 1894: Full opening
- 10 December 1932: Branch to Stanmore opened
- 20 November 1939: Started (Bakerloo)
- 1 May 1979: Ended (Bakerloo)
- 1 May 1979: Started (Jubilee)

Other information
- External links: TfL station info page
- Coordinates: 51.5636°N 0.2794°W

Wembley Park is a London Underground station in Wembley Park, north-west London. It is served by the Jubilee and Metropolitan lines, and is in London fare zone 4. On the Jubilee line the station is between Kingsbury and Neasden stations, and on the Metropolitan line it is between Preston Road and Finchley Road stations.

The station is located on Bridge Road (A4089) and is the nearest tube station to exit for both Wembley Stadium and Wembley Arena. This is where the Jubilee line to Stanmore diverges from the Metropolitan line, which was formerly a branch of the Metropolitan Railway and was taken over by the Bakerloo line and is now part of the Jubilee line.

== History ==
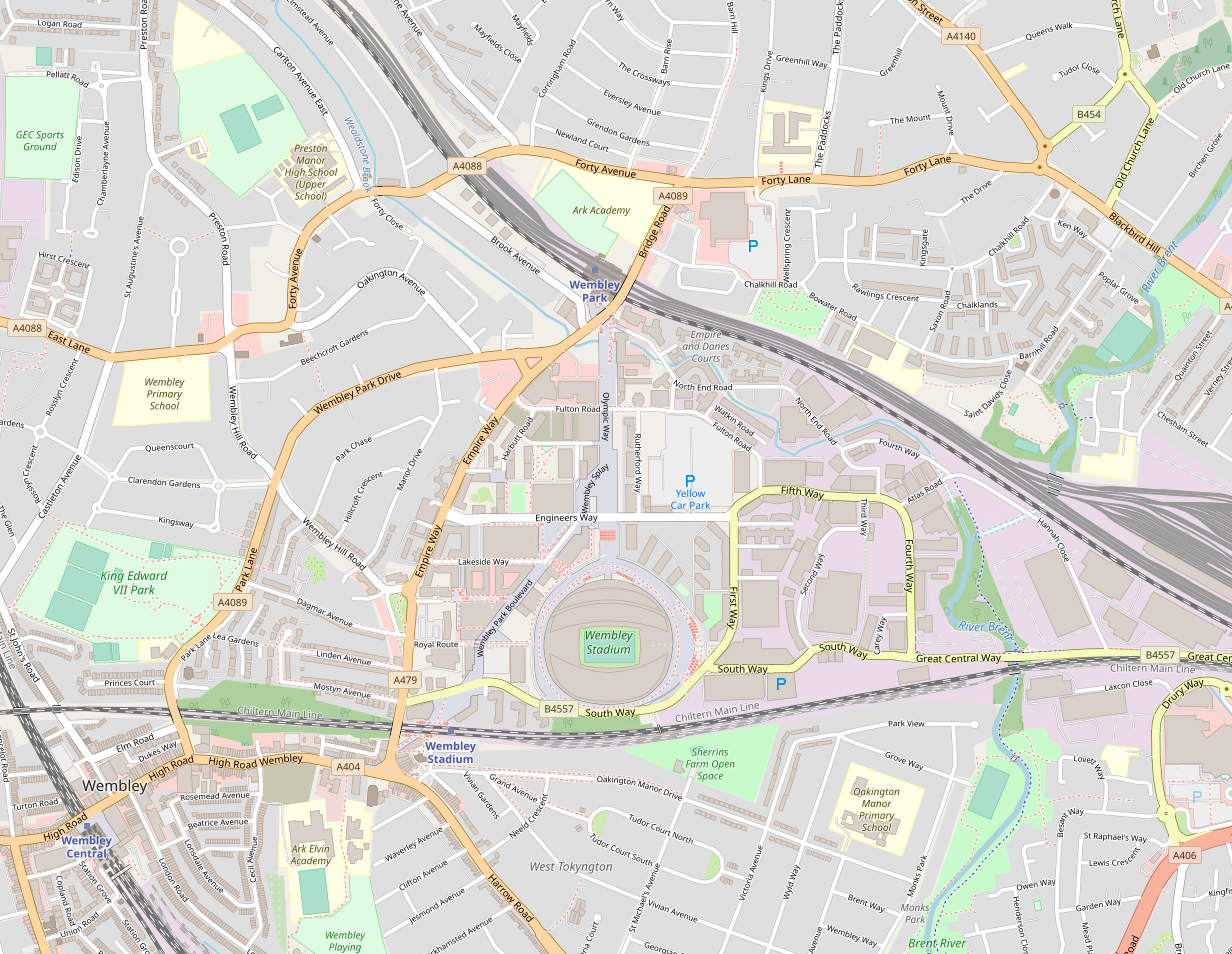
A map of Wembley Stadium in relation to Olympic Way, Wembley Central, Wembley Stadium and Wembley Park stations, and the A406 North Circular road (bottom right)

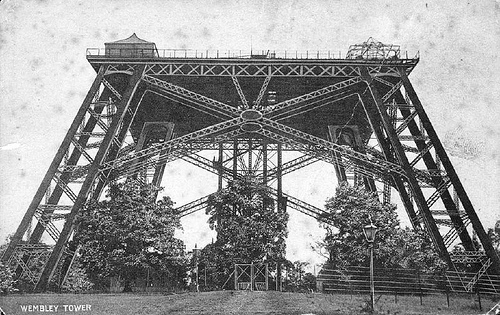
The first and only completed stage of Watkin's Wembley Tower (c.1900)

=== Before the station ===
Until 1880 the Metropolitan Railway (MR) line out of London only ran as far as Willesden Green. In early 1879 work began to build an extension to Harrow-on-the-Hill, with one additional station at Kingsbury and Neasden. Services to Harrow started on 2 August 1880, extending the MR route (today's Metropolitan line) into Middlesex. At this time Wembley was a sparsely populated rural area which did not merit the construction of a railway station and MR trains passed through without stopping.

Beyond Neasden there was an unimportant hamlet where for years the Metropolitan didn't bother to stop. Wembley. Slushy fields and grass farms.

— John Betjeman, Metro-land (1973)

However the then chairman of the MR, Edward Watkin, was an ambitious businessman who sought new ways of attracting paying passengers out of London and onto his railway, and he regarded the barren lands of Wembley as a business opportunity.

=== Opening ===
In 1881, Watkin purchased large tracts of land close to the MR line and began a grand scheme to build an amusement park at Wembley, laid out with boating lakes, a waterfall, ornamental gardens and cricket and football pitches. The centrepiece of this park was to be a soaring metal tower, known as Watkin's Tower; at 1,200 feet (366 m) it was to be taller than the Eiffel Tower and would offer panoramic views of the surrounding countryside, just 12 minutes from Baker Street station. Wembley Park station was specially constructed to serve these pleasure grounds as a destination for excursion trips on the company's trains. The station opened for the first time on 14 October 1893 and initially operated to serve only Saturday football matches in the park. It opened fully on 12 May 1894.

Watkin confidently anticipated that large crowds would flock to the park and the railway station design incorporated additional platforms to handle large passenger numbers. Watkin's Tower ran into structural and financial difficulty; it was never completed and the partially built structure was demolished in 1904. Despite this, Wembley Park itself remained a popular attraction and flourished.

Later in the 1890s, the Great Central Railway's (GCR's) London extension was constructed adjacent to the MR's tracks. The tracks pass under the entrance building but the station has never been served by main line operators. In 1905 the tracks were electrified and the first electric trains became operational. Between 1913 and 1915, the MR added additional tracks to double the line's capacity.

From 1915 the MR began a programme of selling off its surplus land holdings in Buckinghamshire, Hertfordshire and Middlesex for suburban housing development. Its Metropolitan Railway Country Estates Limited marketed areas such as Wembley Park under the "Metro-land" brand, promoting modern homes in beautiful countryside with a fast railway service to central London. The MR sold the park land at Wembley when the site was selected to host the 1924 British Empire Exhibition and the grand British Empire Exhibition Stadium constructed for this event was later to become Wembley Stadium, the home ground of the England national football team.

=== Stanmore branch and Bakerloo line ===
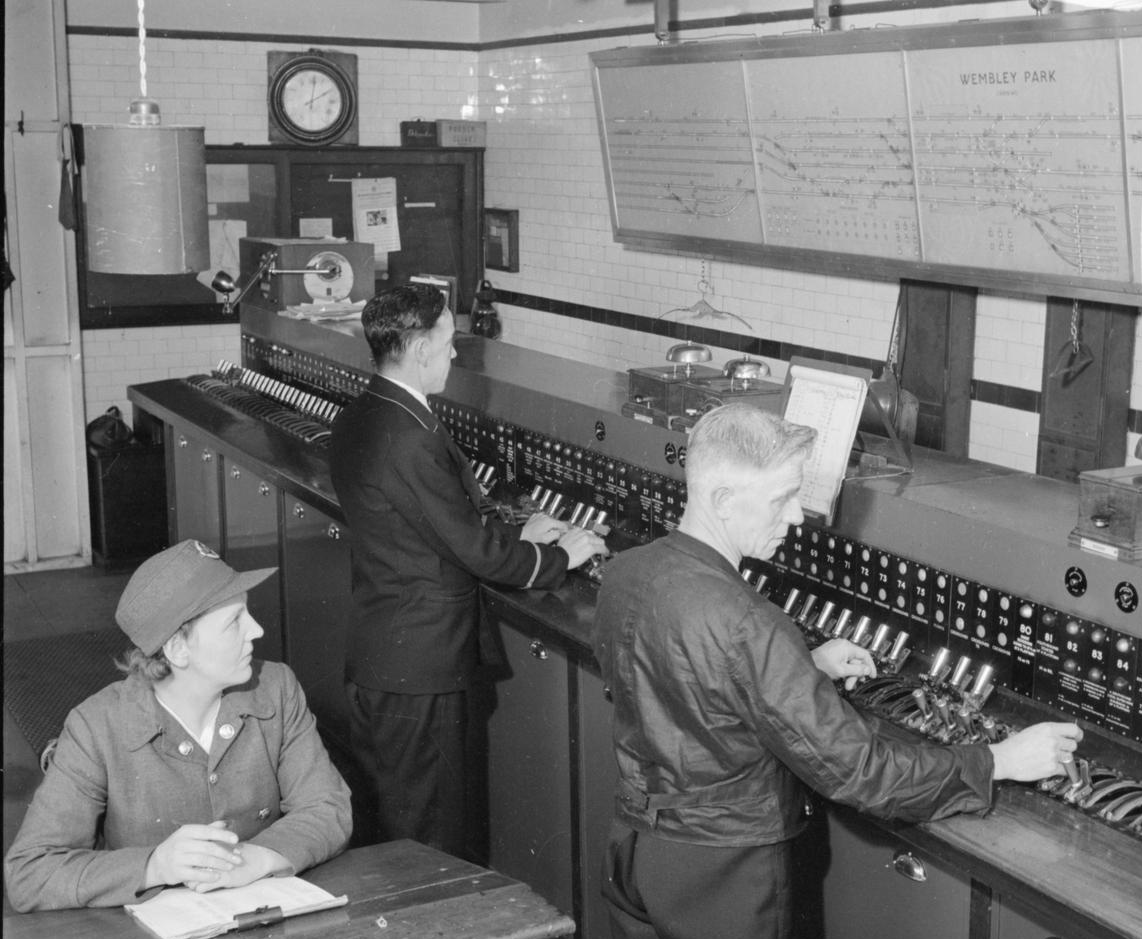
Train dispatchers in the signal box at Wembley Park tube station, 1942

On 10 December 1932, the MR opened a branch line north from Wembley Park to Stanmore. Originally, the MR served all stations south from Wembley Park to Baker Street but the line suffered from congestion due to limited capacity on the tracks heading into Baker Street. Following the combination of the MR and London's other underground railways to form the London Passenger Transport Board (LPTB) in 1933, the LPTB took steps to alleviate the congestion by constructing new tunnels with two new Bakerloo line stations from Baker Street to connect to the Metropolitan line's tracks south of Finchley Road. From 20 November 1939, the Bakerloo line then took over the Stanmore branch between Baker Street and Stanmore, including the five Metropolitan stopping services between Wembley Park and Finchley Road.

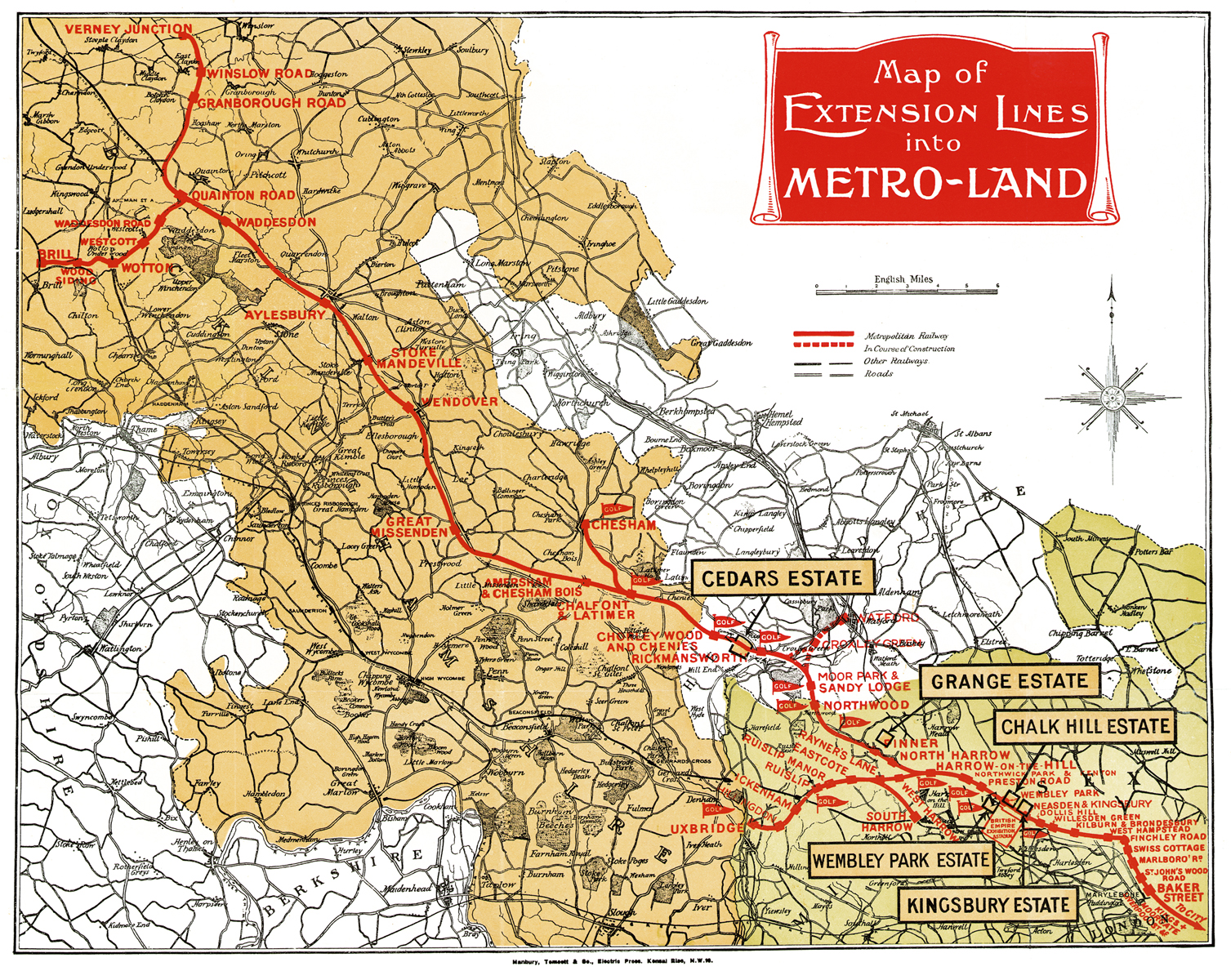
A 1924 map promoting Metro-Land, showing Wembley Park and the British Empire Exhibition

=== 1948 Olympic Games ===
Following World War II, London was chosen to host the 1948 Olympic Games. To handle the exceptional number of spectators visiting Wembley Stadium, the original station building was extended, with a new ticket hall, additional circulation routes and platform stairs. This was built in a red-brick modernist style. At the opening of the Jubilee line on 1 May 1979, the Bakerloo line service from Baker Street to Stanmore was transferred to the new line.

=== UEFA Euro 1996 ===
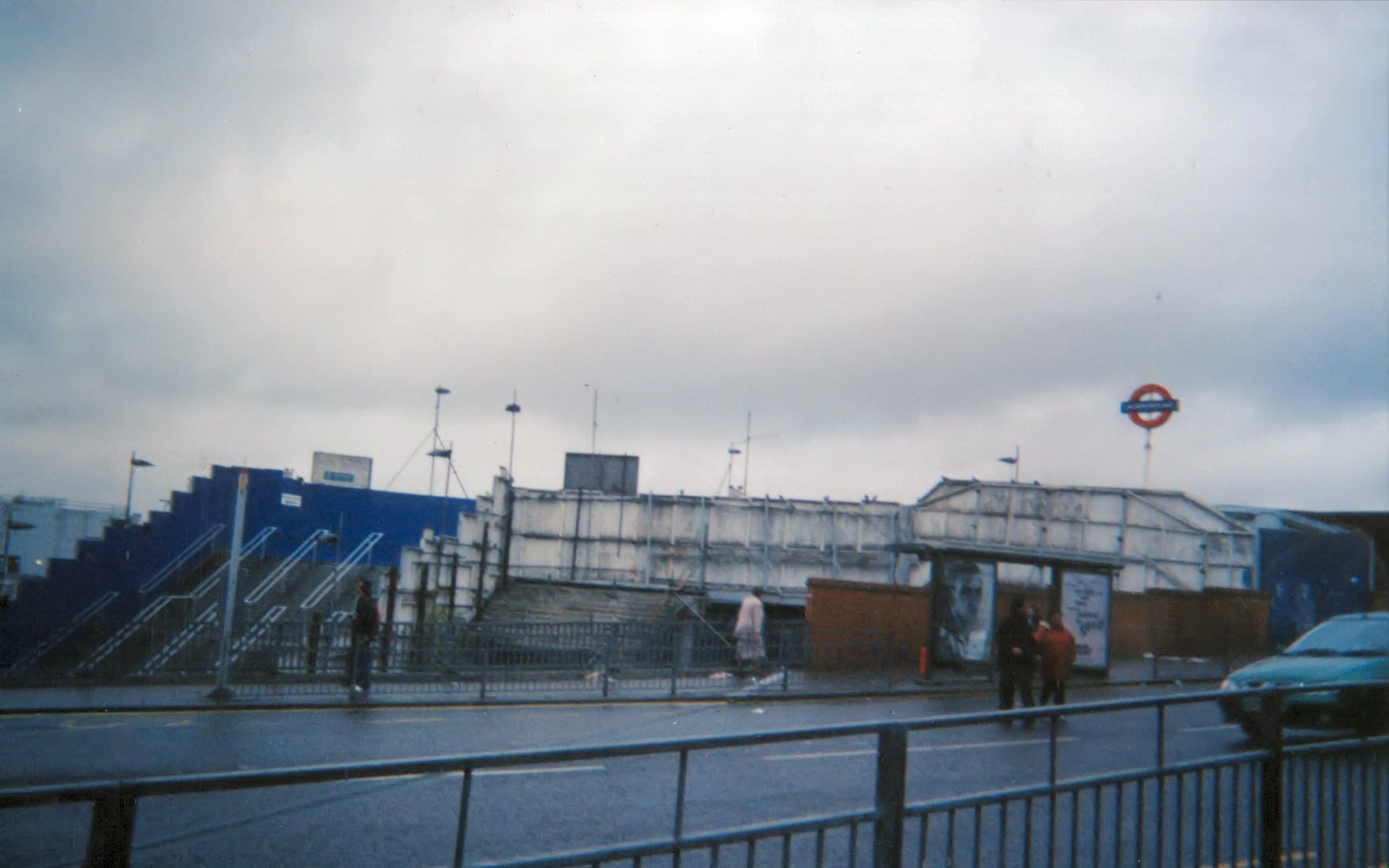
Old 1996 extension, used until 2004

When the UEFA European Football Championship was held at Wembley in 1996, a large temporary staircase was constructed leading down from the 1948 extension and under the newly built Bobby Moore Bridge, which had opened in 1993. Intended as a temporary structure, the staircase remained in its unfinished state until 2004 when station upgrade works commenced.

=== Upgrade and expansion ===
As part of the Wembley Stadium redevelopment in the early 2000s, the station was comprehensively rebuilt and expanded, increasing capacity by 70%. Costing £80 million, the work included a significantly larger ticket hall, additional footbridges, widened stairs to Olympic Way and five lifts to provide step-free access. To cater for event crowds, event day entrances and exits were also constructed. Undertaken by Tube Lines, the expansion was completed in 2006, prior to the completion of the delayed stadium project. The provision of additional platforms for Chiltern Railways services was considered, but was not proceeded with.

In the early 2020s, Transport for London proposed a new residential development on land adjacent to the station currently used as car parking. This development of over 450 new homes with Barratt Homes was approved by Brent Council in December 2020.

== Services ==
Preceding station	London Underground	Following station
Kingsbury towards Stanmore	Jubilee line	Neasden towards Stratford
Preston Road towards Uxbridge, Amersham, Chesham or Watford	Metropolitan line	Finchley Road towards Baker Street or Aldgate
Harrow-on-the-Hill Peak periods only towards Uxbridge, Amersham, Chesham or Watford	Metropolitan line	Finchley Road towards Baker Street or Aldgate
Preceding station	London Underground	Following station
Former services
Kingsbury towards Stanmore	Metropolitan line Stanmore branch (1932–1939)	Neasden towards Baker Street or Aldgate
Kingsbury towards Stanmore	Bakerloo line Stanmore branch (1939–1979)	Neasden towards Elephant & Castle

== Connections ==
The station is also served by day and nighttime London Buses routes.
