= Dollis Hill tube station =

London Underground station

Dollis Hill
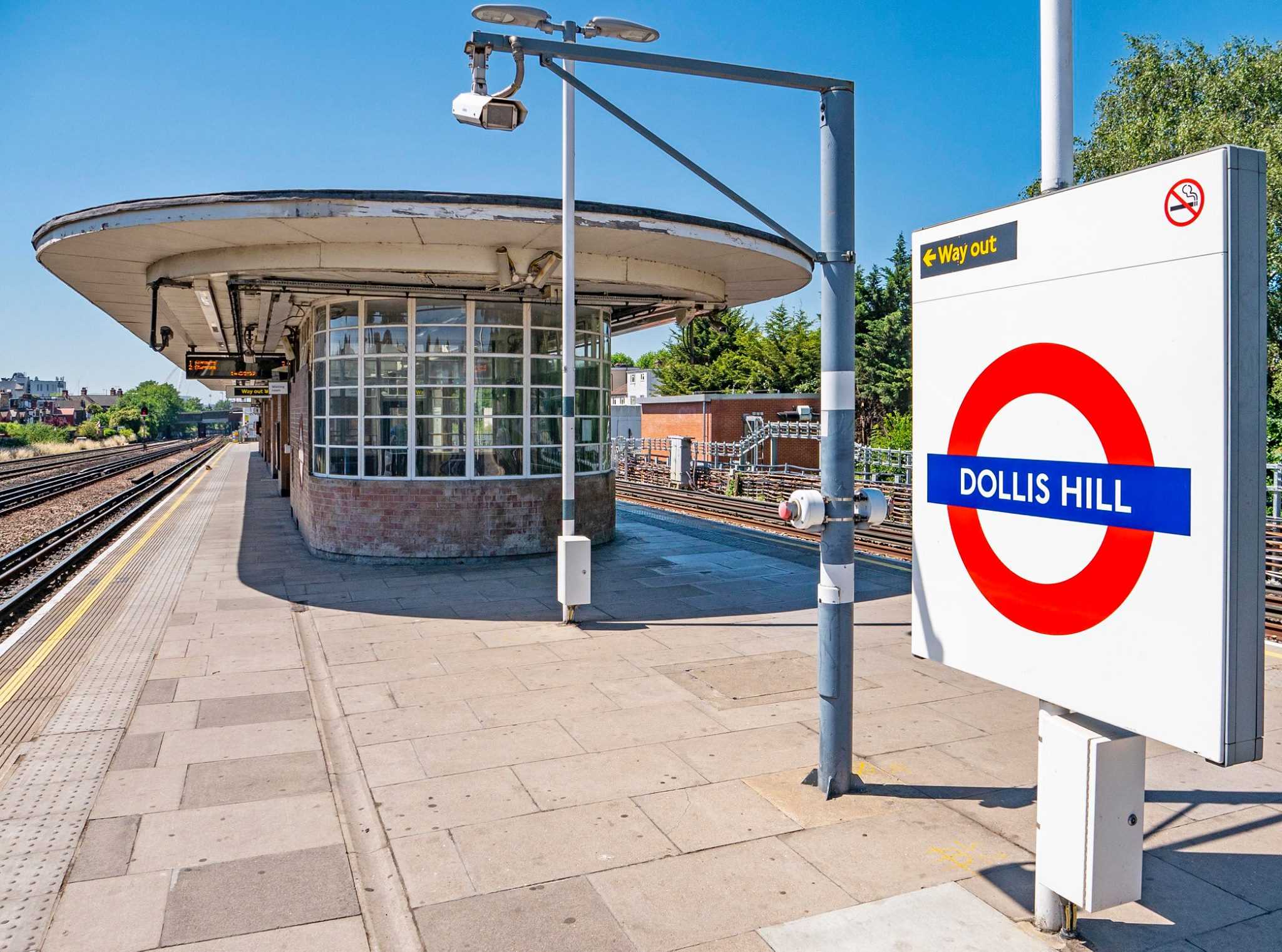
- Island platform at the station
- Interactive map of Dollis Hill

General information
- Location: Dollis Hill
- Local authority: London Borough of Brent
- Managed by: London Underground
- Number of platforms: 2
- Fare zone: 3

London Underground annual entry and exit
- 2021: ▼1.87 million
- 2022: ▲2.93 million
- 2023: ▲3.04 million
- 2024: 3.04 million
- 2025: ▼2.98 million

Railway companies
- Original company: Metropolitan Railway

Key dates
- 1 October 1909: Opened as Dollis Hill
- 1931: Renamed Dollis Hill and Gladstone Park
- 1933: Renamed Dollis Hill
- 20 November 1939: Bakerloo line service introduced
- 7 December 1940: Metropolitan line service ceased
- 1 May 1979: Bakerloo line service replaced by Jubilee line

Other information
- External links: TfL station info page
- Coordinates: 51.55194°N 0.23861°W

Dollis Hill is a London Underground station at Dollis Hill, near to Willesden and Gladstone Park in the London Borough of Brent. It is on the Jubilee line between Neasden and Willesden Green stations, and is in London fare zone 3. Metropolitan line trains pass through the station without stopping.

== History ==
The station opened on 1 October 1909 as part of the Metropolitan Railway.

The current art deco style platform buildings were built in 1938, and were designed by architect Stanley Heaps

From 20 November 1939, it was on the Stanmore branch of the Bakerloo line and was transferred to the Jubilee line in 1979. It has two exits, north to Chapter Road and south to Burnley Road.

In 1995 four sets of enamel panels designed by Amanda Duncan were installed in the subway between the north and south exits. The panels show maps of the Dollis Hill area at different dates from the 16th to the 20th century, juxtaposed with interpretations of classical star maps.

The station was refurbished in 2007 with the addition of new lighting, tiling and additional security cameras. The station was also repainted.

== Services ==
Dollis Hill station is on the Jubilee line in London fare zone 3. It is between Neasden to the north and Willesden Green to the south. Train frequencies vary throughout the day but generally operate every 3–6 minutes between 05:56 and 00:30 in both directions.

== Connections ==
London Bus route 226 directly serves the station, while routes 6, 52, 98, 226, 260, 266, 297, 302 and 460, and night route N98 call nearby the station. Furthermore, routes 6, 52, 266 and 297 are 24-hour services.

Preceding station	London Underground	Following station
Neasden towards Stanmore	Jubilee line	Willesden Green towards Stratford
Former services
Preceding station	London Underground	Following station
Neasden towards Stanmore	Metropolitan line Stanmore branch (1932–1939)	Willesden Green towards Baker Street or Aldgate
Neasden towards Stanmore	Bakerloo line Stanmore branch (1939–1979)	Willesden Green towards Elephant & Castle
