= Preston, London =

Coordinates: 51.570934°N 0.294914°W

Preston
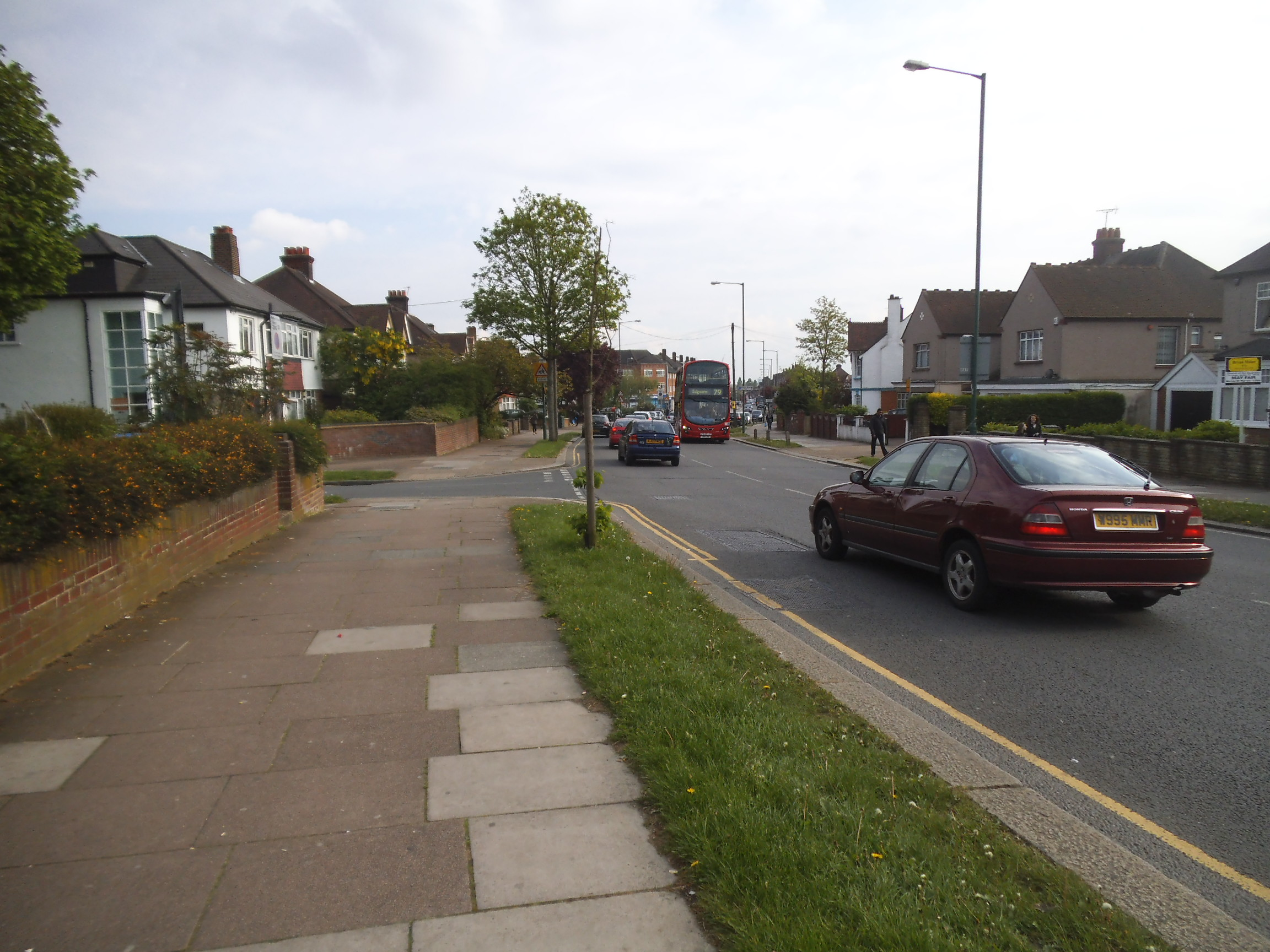
- Preston Road

- Location within Greater London
- OS grid reference: TQ175855
- London borough: Brent
- Ceremonial county: Greater London
- Region: London
- Country: England
- Sovereign state: United Kingdom
- Post town: WEMBLEY
- Postcode district: HA9
- Post town: HARROW
- Postcode district: HA3
- Dialling code: 020
- Police: Metropolitan
- Fire: London
- Ambulance: London
- UK Parliament: Brent West
- London Assembly: Brent and Harrow

Preston is a small locality in northwest London. It forms part of the London Borough of Brent and the northern part of Wembley. It is a residential suburb containing Preston Road Station (Metropolitan line) with some stores on either side. The area to the station's north is covered under the HA3 postcode and is, along with the area around South Kenton station to the west, normally considered part of Kenton.

== Facilities ==
The Preston Manor School is located in the area, and JFS is also nearby. It also contains the award-winning Blue Oyster Fish Bar, the Kenton Hall venue, and a youth football club called Forest United. London bus routes 79, 204 and 223 serve Preston, the latter with a long hail and ride section to or from Kenton. Residents in both areas have voiced disapproval at plans to cut route 223 between Harrow and Northwick Park Hospital, likely to become effective in 2019. The change to the 223 has not come into effect as of August 2022.

Preston Park is a 7.5-hectare (19-acre), Green Flag accredited public park in Preston Road. It is a grassed area with scattered trees, with two sports pavilions and a children's playground. There is access from Carlton Avenue East, College Road and Montpelier Rise.

== Governance ==
Preston is part of the Brent North parliamentary constituency, most recently represented by Barry Gardiner.

== Gallery ==
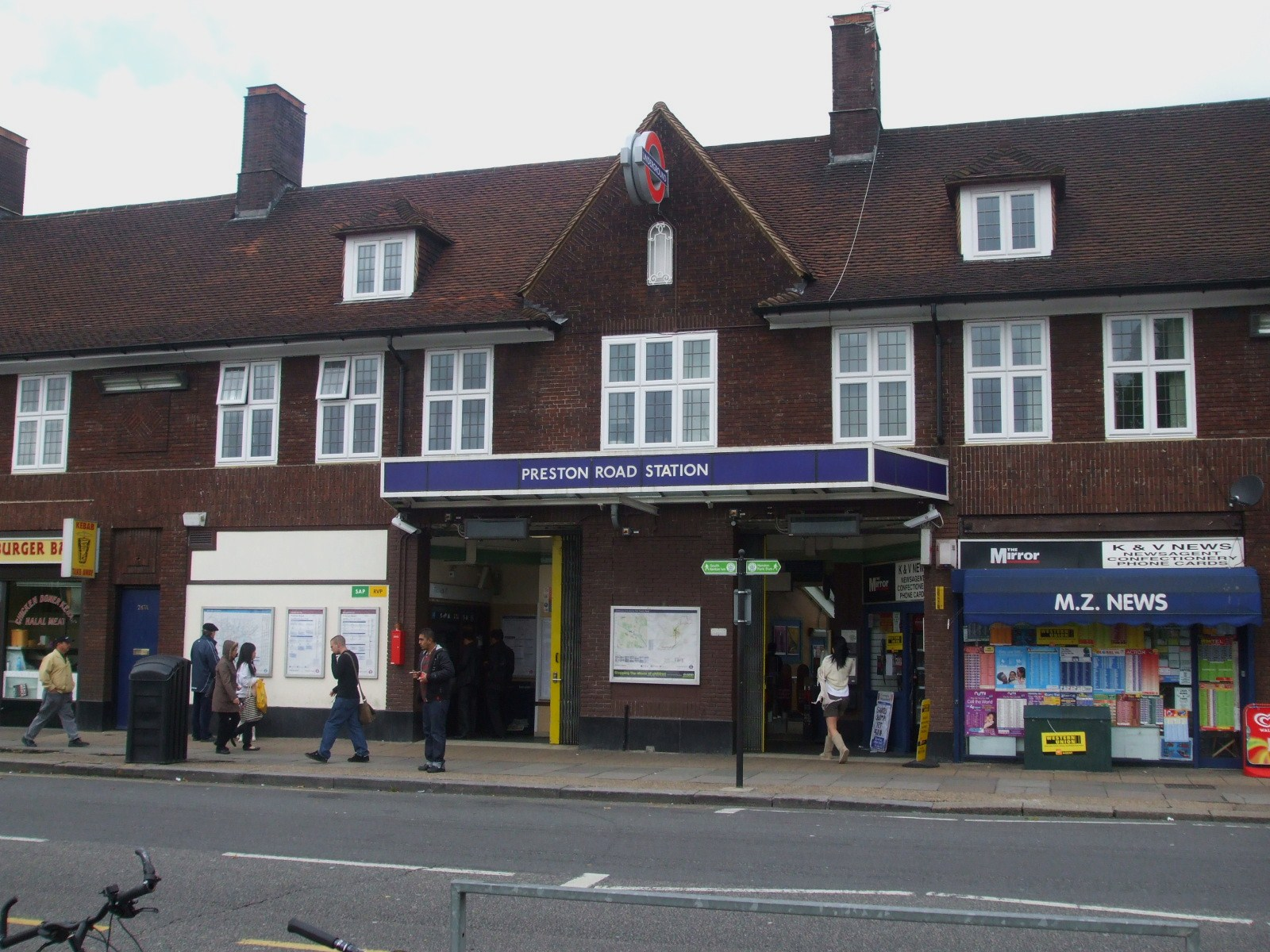
Preston Road station building

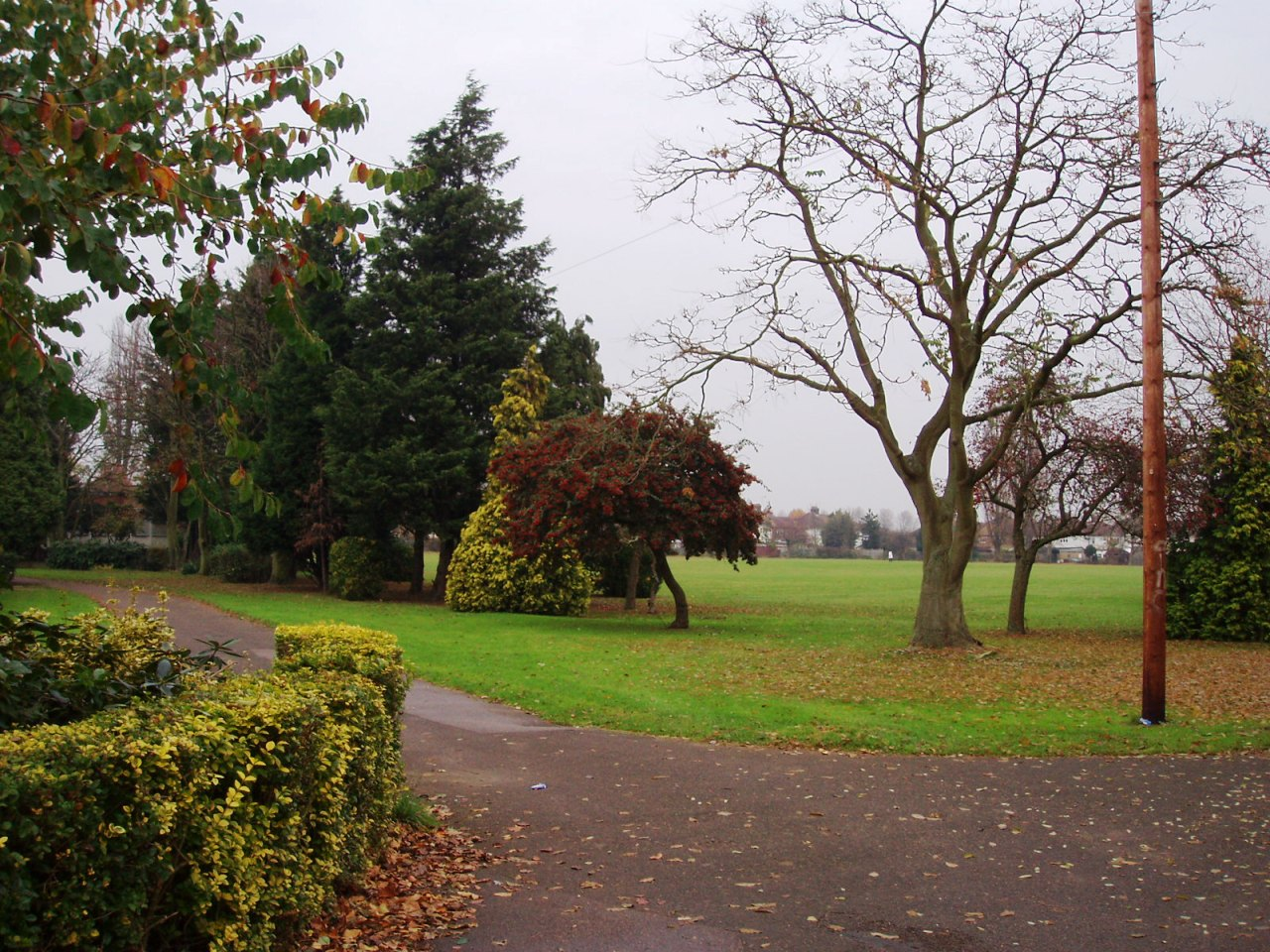
Preston Park

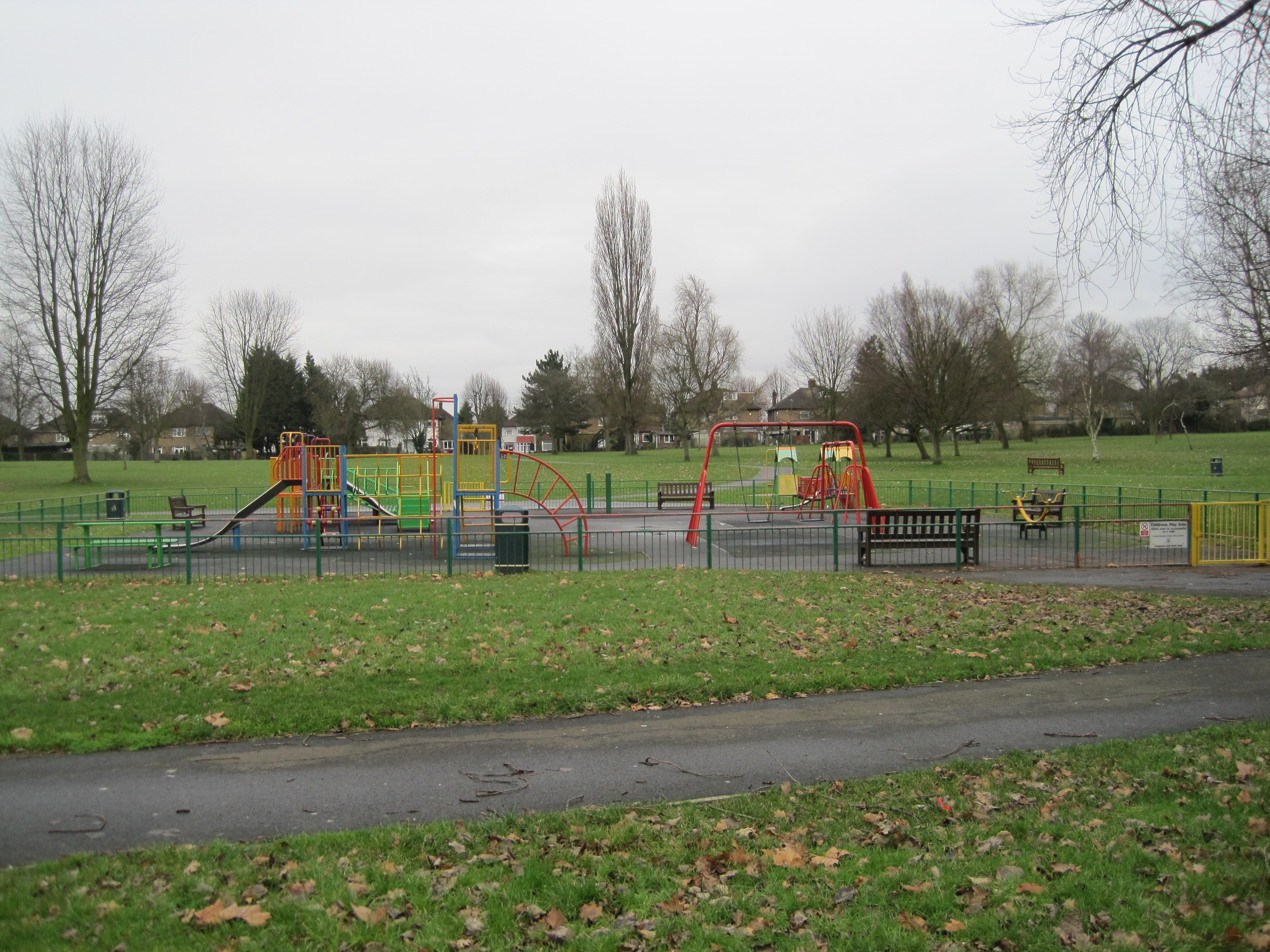
Preston Park playground

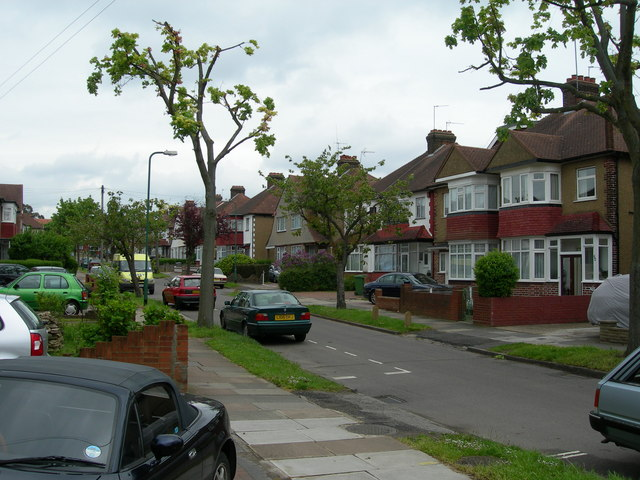
Montpelier Rise, with typical 1930s semi-detached housing

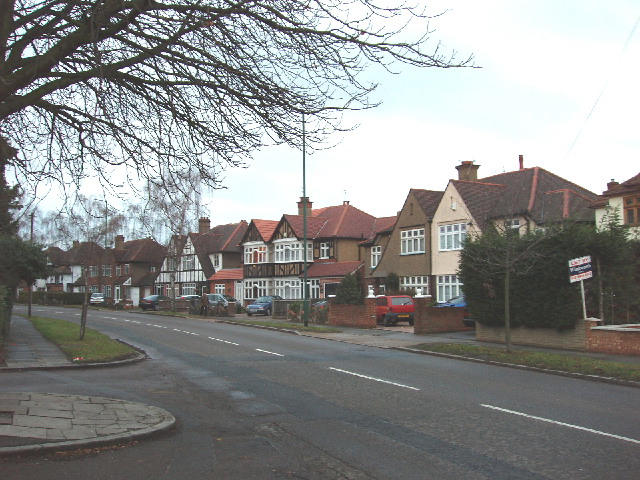
Woodcock Hill

== Notable people ==
- Lolly Adefope, comedian
- John Lyon, founder of Harrow School
