= London Borough of Brent =

Local government district in London

- London borough
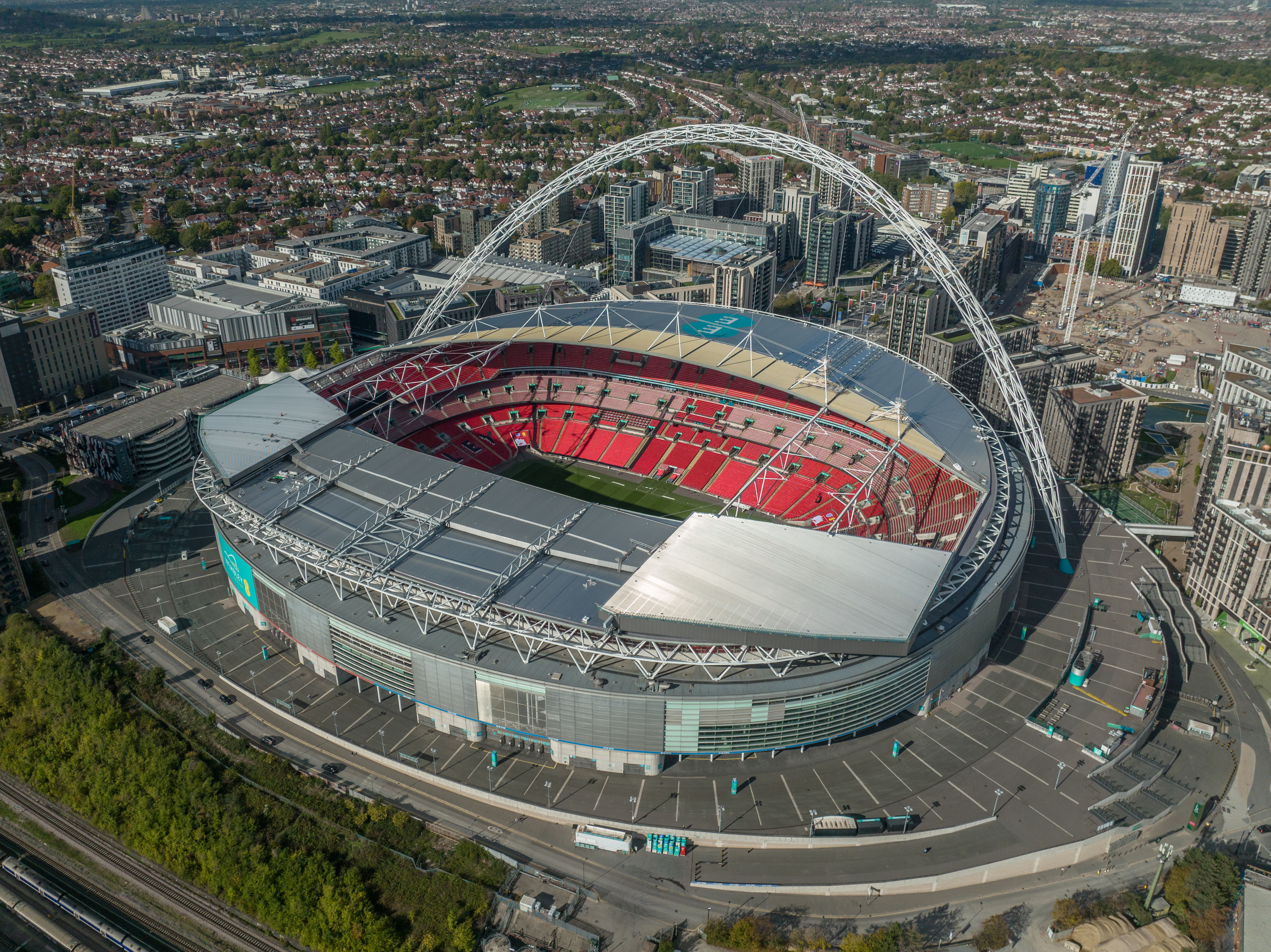
- Wembley Stadium in Wembley

- Coat of arms Council logo
- Motto: Forward Together
- Brent shown within Greater London
- Coordinates: 51°33′58″N 0°16′26″W
- Sovereign state: United Kingdom
- Constituent country: England
- Region: London
- Ceremonial county: Greater London
- Created: 1 April 1965
- Admin HQ: Engineers Way, Wembley

Government
  - Type: London borough council
  - Body: Brent London Borough Council
  - London Assembly: Krupesh Hirani (Labour) AM for Brent and Harrow
  - MPs: 4 MPs: Bob Blackman (C) (Note: Constituency partly in Harrow); Dawn Butler (L); Barry Gardiner (L); Georgia Gould (L) (Note: Constituency partly in Westminster)

Area
  - Total: 16.70 sq mi (43.24 km^{2})
  - Rank: 255th (of 296)

Population (2025)
  - Total: 352,201
  - Rank: 30th (of 296)
  - Density: 21,100/sq mi (8,145/km^{2})
- Time zone: UTC (GMT)
  - Summer (DST): UTC+1 (BST)
- Postcodes: HA, NW, W
- Area code: 020
- ISO 3166 code: GB-BEN
- ONS code: 00AE
- GSS code: E09000005
- Police: Metropolitan Police
- Website: www.brent.gov.uk

Brent (/brɛnt/) is a borough in north-west London, England; it forms part of Outer London. It is known for landmarks such as Wembley Stadium, the Swaminarayan Temple and the Kiln Theatre. It also contains the Welsh Harp reservoir and the Park Royal commercial estate. The local authority is Brent London Borough Council.

Brent's population was estimated to be 353,000 as of 2024. The borough includes a variety of districts and neighbourhoods, including Kenton, Kilburn, Willesden, Wembley, Harlesden, Stonebridge, Kingsbury, Kensal Green, Neasden, Queen's Park, Cricklewood, Park Royal, Alperton, Sudbury, Preston, Queensbury, Colindale and Burnt Oak, some of which extend into neighbouring London boroughs.

Brent has a mixture of residential, industrial and commercial land. It includes many districts of inner-city character in the east and a more distinct suburban character in the west, part of which formed part of the early 20th century Metroland developments.

== Local government ==
=== Administrative history ===
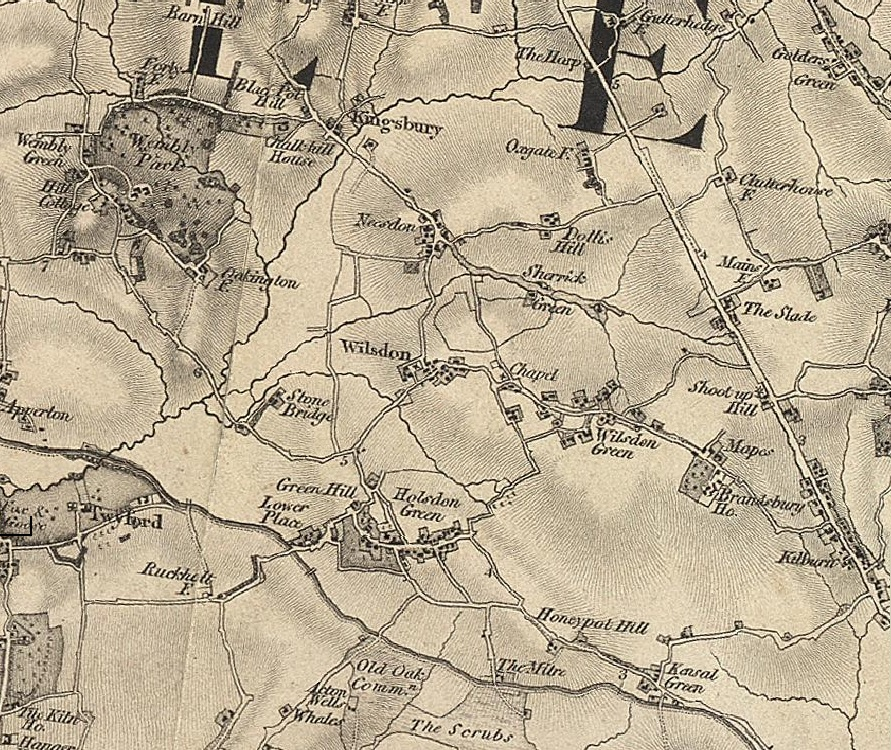
The Brent area in the Ordnance Survey's First Series of maps (1805–1869)

The London Borough of Brent was created in 1965 under the London Government Act 1963, covering the combined area of the former Municipal Borough of Wembley and the Municipal Borough of Willesden. The area was transferred from Middlesex to Greater London to become one of the 32 London Boroughs.

The borough of Willesden had evolved from a local government district created in 1874 for the parish of Willesden. Such districts were reconstituted as urban districts under the Local Government Act 1894.

To coincide with the 1894 Act coming into force, an urban district called Wembley was created, covering the two parishes of Kingsbury and Wembley, the latter being created at the same time from areas formerly in the ancient parish of Harrow on the Hill. Kingsbury seceded from the Wembley Urban District in 1900 to become its own urban district, but was reunited with the Wembley Urban District in 1934. Willesden was incorporated to become a municipal borough in 1933, as was Wembley in 1937.

The modern borough takes its name from the River Brent which runs through the borough and separated the former boroughs of Wembley and Willesden.

== Governance ==
The local authority is Brent Council, which is based at Brent Civic Centre in the Wembley Park area of the borough.

=== Greater London representation ===
Since 2000, for elections to the London Assembly, the borough forms part of the Brent and Harrow constituency.

=== UK Parliament ===
The borough is included in three parliamentary constituencies: Brent East, Brent West and Queen's Park and Maida Vale – which includes part of the City of Westminster. These were created by the 2023 review of Westminster constituencies, superseding the three previous constituencies of Brent North, Brent Central and Hampstead and Kilburn, which included part of the London Borough of Camden. Before the 2010 general election Brent was divided into three constituencies contained wholly within the borough – Brent South, Brent East and Brent North.

== Demographics ==
Population pyramid of the Borough of Brent in 2021

Population
Year	Pop.	±%
1801	2,022	—
1811	2,690	+33.0%
1821	3,074	+14.3%
1831	3,991	+29.8%
1841	5,416	+35.7%
1851	5,646	+4.2%
1861	14,749	+161.2%
1871	23,852	+61.7%
1881	32,955	+38.2%
1891	67,674	+105.4%
1901	105,613	+56.1%
1911	164,833	+56.1%
1921	202,448	+22.8%
1931	248,656	+22.8%
1941	277,842	+11.7%
1951	310,457	+11.7%
1961	294,804	−5.0%
1971	280,009	−5.0%
1981	251,249	−10.3%
1991	248,569	−1.1%
2001	263,463	+6.0%
2011	311,215	+18.1%
2021	339,800	+9.2%
2024 estimate	352,976	+3.9%
Source: A Vision of Britain through time 2024 estimate

In 1801, the civil parishes that form the modern borough had a total population of 2,022. This rose slowly throughout the nineteenth century, as the district became built up; reaching 5,646 in the middle of the century. When the railways arrived the rate of population growth increased. The population took five decades to rebound to the more muted peak of the 1950s, when much industry relocated from London, further boosting the speed of the wave of new housing then built.

Brent is the most diverse locality in the UK by country of birth. It in 2019 became the only local authority with over 50% of residents, namely 52%, born abroad. Large Asian and Indian, Black African, Black Caribbean, Irish, and Eastern European communities exist. 45 per cent of the population was a minority ethnicity in the 1991 census, the most in England at the time. In 1991 17.2% were Indian, 10.2% were Black Caribbean and 9% were Irish. Brent was the only Outer London borough combining high proportions of Indian and Afro-Caribbean ethnicities.

The 2001 UK Census found that the borough had a population of 263,464 residents, of whom 127,806 were male, and 135,658 female. Of those stating a choice, 47.71% described themselves as Christian, 17.71% as Hindus, 12.26% as Muslims and 10% as having no religion. Among residents, 39.96% were in full-time employment and 7.86% in part-time employment – compared to a London average of 42.64% and 8.62%, respectively. Narrowly most residents included an owner-occupier in their household, with 23.17% of households owning their house outright, and a further 31.33% owning with a mortgage. 10.59% were in local authority housing, with a further 13.29% renting from a housing association, or other registered social landlord.

The 2021 census found that the borough has England and Wales's lowest proportion of people born in the UK, at 43.9%.

The borough of Brent is extremely ethnically diverse, having changed greatly since 1951. In the 2011 census, those who identified as White British made up 18% of the borough's population. 18% identified as other White, 5% were of mixed heritage, those of South Asian heritage comprised about 33%, those of African and Caribbean heritage about 19%, and other ethnic groups about 7%. White ethnicities were relatively high in the wards of Mapesbury (straddling Willesden Green and Cricklewood), Brondesbury Park, Queen's Park and Kilburn. Black ethnicities in highest proportion were in Stonebridge, Harlesden and Kensal Green wards. Asian ethnicities in highest proportion were in the wards of Alperton, Wembley Central and Kenton. Those who ethnically identify as BAME (Black, Asian and minority Ethnic) was as high as 86% in Wembley Central – one of the highest in London – and most other Brent wards have a majority BAME population. Queen's Park had the lowest BAME proportion, at 37.0%.

Brent has the highest proportion of Irish residents in Britain, with 4% of the population. It also has the largest Brazilian community in the UK; one of the largest Indian communities; a significant Afro-Caribbean community; and more recent Romanian, Polish and Somali communities.

The 2021 census showed that 1.3% of adults in Brent identified as transgender, derived from the Census question, "Is the gender you identify with the same as your sex registered at birth?". This gave Brent the second highest proportion of transgender adults after the Borough of Newham (at 1.5%). The overall proportion in England and Wales was 0.5% with Brighton, an area well known for its LGBT communities, 1%. However, Prof Michael Biggs of Oxford University showed there was a correlation between the proportion of transgender people in these areas and the proportion for whom English was not their first language (34% in Brent and 35% in Newham, compared to 9% nationally), suggesting the question was not fully understood by some. Prof Biggs described the figures as "irredeemably flawed". In September 2024, Mary Gregory, a deputy director at the ONS said some people may have misunderstood the question, saying there was "potential bias" in how the question was answered "by those who responded that they had lower levels of English proficiency, some of whom may have mistakenly given an answer suggesting they were trans". As a result, the ONS downgraded the data from "accredited official statistics" to "official statistics in development" to reflect the possible flaws.

=== Religion ===
As of 2011, 41.5% identified themselves as Christian, 18.6% Muslim, 17.8% Hindu and 10.6% with no religion. Brent is home of the Neasden Temple, once the largest Hindu Mandir outside India; and JFS, the largest Jewish school in Europe. There is also an Islamic school called Islamia Primary School founded by Cat Stevens.

The following table shows the religious identity of residents residing in Brent according to the 2001, 2011 and the 2021 censuses.

Religion	1995 estimates		2001 census		2011 census		2021 census	
Religion	Number	%	Number	%	Number	%	Number	%
Christian	–	–	125,702	47.7	129,080	41.5	131,914	38.8
Muslim	–	–	32,290	12.3	58,036	18.6	72,574	21.4
Jewish	10,100	4.2%	6,464	2.5	4,357	1.4	3,723	1.1
Hindu	–	–	45,228	17.2	55,449	17.8	52,876	15.6
Sikh	–	–	1,738	0.7	1,709	0.5	1,530	0.5
Buddhism	–	–	2,497	0.9	4,300	1.4	3,117	0.9
Other religion	–	–	2,977	1.1	3,768	1.2	4,424	1.3
No religion	–	–	26,252	10.0	33,054	10.6	46,153	13.6
Religion not stated	–	–	20,316	7.7	21,462	6.9	23,506	6.9
Total	–	–	263,464	100.00%	311,215	100.00%	339,800	100.0%

=== Health ===
According to the House of Commons survey of female genital mutilation, in the year to 31 March 2016, Brent represented the highest number of attendees, by current residence or visiting location, to medical services, at 1,250, 545 more than the next-highest local authority, Bristol.

In 2015, the BBC reported that some wards of Brent and four other London boroughs had rates of tuberculosis over ten times the national average, and higher than rates seen in Iraq and Rwanda.

=== Ethnicity ===
Ethnic makeup of Brent by single year ages in 2021

This table shows the stated ethnic group of respondents in the 1991 to 2021 censuses and estimates for 1966 and 1981 in Brent.

Ethnic Group	Year													
Ethnic Group	1966 estimations		1971 estimations		1981 estimations		1991 census		2001 census		2011 census		2021 census	
Ethnic Group	Number	%	Number	%	Number	%	Number	%	Number	%	Number	%	Number	%
White: Total	–	92.6%	–	82%	152,640	67.4%	136,150	54.8%	119,278	45.27%	112,880	36.27%	117,701	34.6%
White: British	–	–	–	–	–	–	–	–	76,893	29.19%	55,887	17.96%	51,611	15.2%
White: Irish	–	–	–	–	–	–	–	–	18,313	6.95%	12,320	3.96%	9,314	2.7%
White: Gypsy or Irish Traveller	–	–	–	–	–	–	–	–	–	–	320	0.10%	237	0.1%
White: Roma	–	–	–	–	–	–							2,520	0.7%
White: Other	–	–	–	–	–	–	–	–	24,072	9.14%	44,353	14.25%	54,019	15.9%
Asian or Asian British: Total	–	–	–	–	39,359	17.4%	63,141	25.4%	75,874	28.80%	105,986	34.06%	111,515	32.8%
Asian or Asian British: Indian	–	–	–	–	28,238	12.5%	43,230	17.4%	48,624	18.46%	58,017	18.64%	66,157	19.5%
Asian or Asian British: Pakistani	–	–	–	–	4,714	2.1%	7,565	3%	10,626	4.03%	14,381	4.62%	15,217	4.5%
Asian or Asian British: Bangladeshi	–	–	–	–	434		758		1,184	0.45%	1,749	0.56%	2,186	0.6%
Asian or Asian British: Chinese	–	–	–	–	1,943		2,641		2,812	1.07%	3,250	1.04%	3,393	1.0%
Asian or Asian British: Other Asian	–	–	–	–	4,030	1.8%	8,947	3.6%	12,628	4.79%	28,589	9.19%	24,562	7.2%
Black or Black British: Total	–	–	–	–	29,825	13.2%	41,467	16.7%	52,337	19.86%	58,632	18.84%	59,495	17.5%
Black or Black British: African	–	–	–	–	5,888	2.6%	10,305	4.1%	20,640	7.83%	24,391	7.84%	31,070	9.1%
Black or Black British: Caribbean	–	–	–	–	19,932	8.8%	25,618	10.3%	27,574	10.47%	23,723	7.62%	21,258	6.3%
Black or Black British: Other Black	–	–	–	–	4,005	1.8%	5,544	2.2%	4,123	1.56%	10,518	3.38%	7,167	2.1%
Mixed or British Mixed: Total	–	–	–	–	–	–	–	–	9,802	3.72%	15,775	5.07%	17,249	5.1%
Mixed: White and Black Caribbean	–	–	–	–	–	–	–	–	2,739	1.04%	4,291	1.38%	3,775	1.1%
Mixed: White and Black African	–	–	–	–	–	–	–	–	1,739	0.66%	2,820	0.91%	3,184	0.9%
Mixed: White and Asian	–	–	–	–	–	–	–	–	2,529	0.96%	3,642	1.17%	3,607	1.1%
Mixed: Other Mixed	–	–	–	–	–	–	–	–	2,795	1.06%	5,022	1.61%	6,683	2.0%
Other: Total	–	–	–	–	4,757	2.1%	7,842	3.2%	6,173	2.34%	17,942	5.77%	33,861	10%
Other: Arab	–	–	–	–	–	–	–	–	–	–	11,430	3.67%	17,924	5.3%
Other: Any other ethnic group	–	–	–	–	–	–	–	–	–	–	6,512	2.09%	15,937	4.7%
Ethnic minority: Total	–	7.4%	–	18%	73,941	32.6%	112,450	45.2%	144,186	54.73%	198,335	63.73%	222,120	65.4%
Total	–	100%	–	100%	226,581	100%	248,600	100%	263,464	100.00%	311,215	100.00%	339,821	100%

=== Immigration ===
This list includes top-15 sources of immigration to Borough of Brent for 2021 census:

#	Country	Number
1	India	35,203
2	Romania	17,722
3	Poland	7,235
4	Somalia	6,678
5	Pakistan	6,585
6	Kenya	6,370
7	Ireland	5,850
8	Sri Lanka	5,672
9	Brazil	5,532
10	Jamaica	5,423
11	Italy	4,662
12	Philippines	4,415
13	Iraq	3,646
14	Portugal	3,528
15	Afghanistan	3,504

== Geography ==
Major districts of Brent include Kilburn, Willesden and Wembley.

=== Climate ===
Climate in this area has mild differences between highs and lows, and there is adequate rainfall year-round. The Köppen Climate Classification subtype for this climate is "Cfb". (Marine West Coast Climate/Oceanic climate).

Climate data for Borough of Brent, UK
Month	Jan	Feb	Mar	Apr	May	Jun	Jul	Aug	Sep	Oct	Nov	Dec	Year
Mean daily maximum °C (°F)	8 (46)	8 (46)	10 (50)	12 (54)	15 (59)	17 (63)	19 (66)	19 (66)	17 (63)	14 (57)	11 (52)	8 (46)	13 (55)
Mean daily minimum °C (°F)	3 (37)	3 (37)	4 (39)	5 (41)	8 (46)	10 (50)	12 (54)	12 (54)	10 (50)	8 (46)	6 (43)	4 (39)	7 (45)
Average precipitation mm (inches)	130 (5.2)	110 (4.3)	79 (3.1)	84 (3.3)	79 (3.1)	64 (2.5)	76 (3)	89 (3.5)	89 (3.5)	140 (5.7)	150 (5.9)	150 (6.1)	1,250 (49.4)
Source: Weatherbase

== Economy ==
Behind Tower Hamlets, Brent has the highest poverty rate in London after housing costs. It was the borough with the highest average unemployment rate in 2022 with 7%. More than one in three households live in poverty, 9% above the London average, and 14% above the England average.

Diageo has its head office in Park Royal and in Brent, on a former Guinness brewery property. The brewery was closed in 2004; it had produced beer since 1936. Diageo planned to move its head office to Brent from Central London when the lease on the Central London office expired in 2010.

== Amenities and culture ==
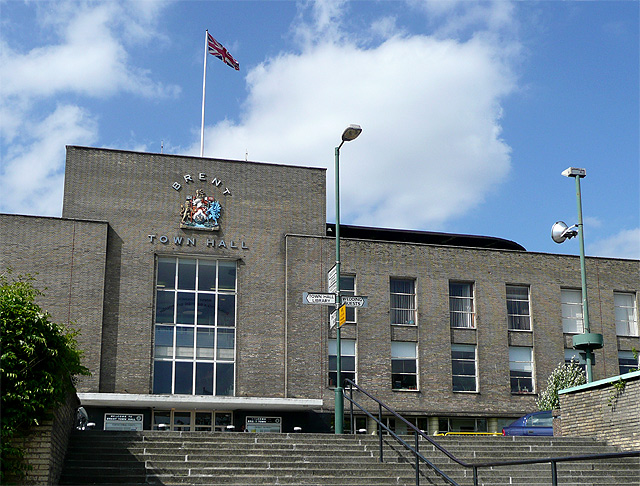
The old Brent Town Hall

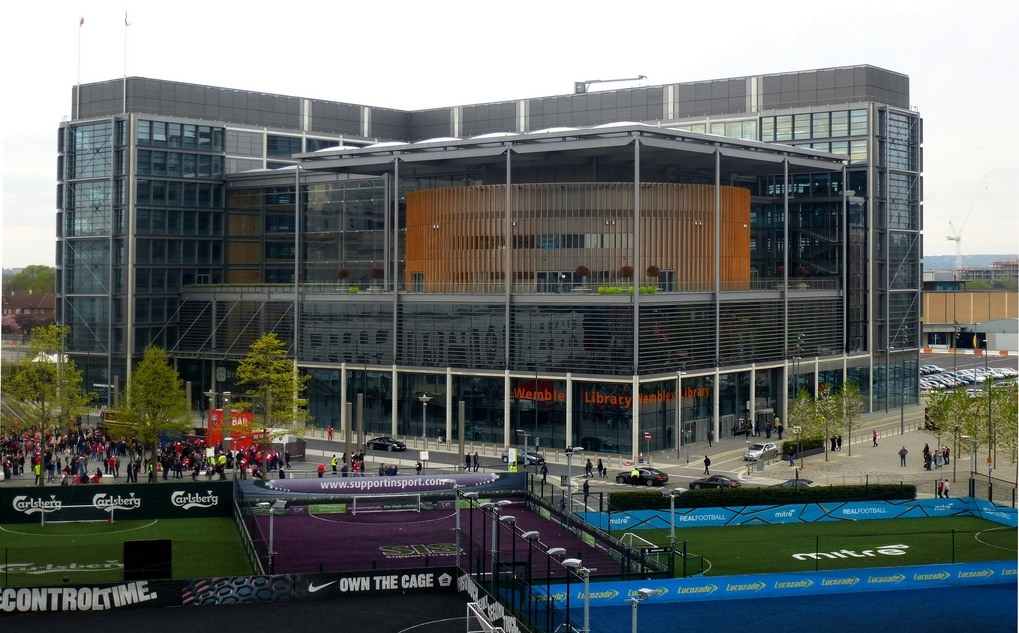
The new Brent Civic Centre

=== Compulsory recycling ===
Recycling has been compulsory in Brent since 2008.

=== London Fire Brigade ===
Brent has three fire stations: Park Royal, Wembley and Willesden. Brent has a mixture of residential, industrial and commercial land. Wembley National Stadium is in the borough; on match days the fire safety of over 90,000 people falls to the London Fire Brigade. The Wembley station covers the largest area in the borough, 19.1 km^{2} (7.4 sq mi). Two pumping appliances, a fire rescue unit and an aerial ladder platform are based there. Willesden, for its more typical area covered (10.5 km^{2} (4.1 sq mi)), responded to over a thousand incidents in 2006/2007. Two pumping appliances reside there. Park Royal, with its one pumping appliance and an incident response unit covers 8.1 km^{2} (3.1 sq mi). Within the borough, 4,105 incidents occurred in 2006/2007.

=== Transport ===
Like most of northwest London, Brent is served extensively by the London Underground. 21 tube stations are located in Brent, all served by either the Metropolitan, Jubilee, Bakerloo or Piccadilly Lines. All of them are surface level, with the exception of Kilburn Park tube station in the southeast of the borough. This number is the second highest of all London boroughs behind Westminster, which has 32 stations within its boundaries. The numerous London Underground, London Overground and National Rail stations in the borough are:

- Alperton tube station
- Brondesbury railway station
- Brondesbury Park railway station
- Dollis Hill tube station
- Harlesden station
- Kensal Green station
- Kenton station
- Kilburn tube station
- Kilburn Park tube station
- Kingsbury tube station
- Neasden tube station
- North Wembley station
- Northwick Park tube station
- Preston Road tube station
- Queensbury tube station
- Queen's Park station
- South Kenton station
- Stonebridge Park station
- Sudbury Town tube station
- Sudbury & Harrow Road railway station
- Wembley Central station
- Wembley Park tube station
- Wembley Stadium railway station
- Willesden Green tube station
- Willesden Junction station

==== Travel to work ====
In March 2011, the plurality of residents aged 16–74 were not in employment, 38.9%. After that, the main forms of transport to work were:

- underground, metro, light rail, tram, 18.3%;
- driving a car or van, 17.4%;
- bus, minibus or coach, 11.5%;
- on foot, 4.6%;
- train, 4.5%;
- work mainly at or from home, 2.6%;
- bicycle, 1.7%.

=== Landmarks ===
- Wembley Stadium
- Wembley Arena
- Neasden Temple
- Jubilee clock Harlesden
- Brent Civic Centre
- Shree Swaminarayan Temple, Kingsbury

=== Parks and open spaces ===
- Roe Green Park
- Fryent Country Park
- Queen's Park
- Roundwood Park
- Tiverton Green
- Gladstone Park
- Barham Park
- One Tree Hill Park
- Maybank Open Space
- King Edward VII Park
- Harlesden Town Garden

=== Sport and leisure ===
The Borough has three Non-League football clubs:

- Tokyngton Manor F.C., which plays at Spratleys Meadow.
- Wembley F.C., which plays at Vale Farm stadium
- South Kilburn F.C. which plays at Vale Farm stadium.

== Town twinning ==
Brent is twinned with:

- South Dublin, Leinster, Ireland
- Nablus, Palestine

== Freedom of the Borough ==
The following people and military units have received the Freedom of the Borough of Brent.

=== Individuals ===
- Nelson Mandela: 24 June 2013.
