= Neasden tube station =

London Underground station

Neasden
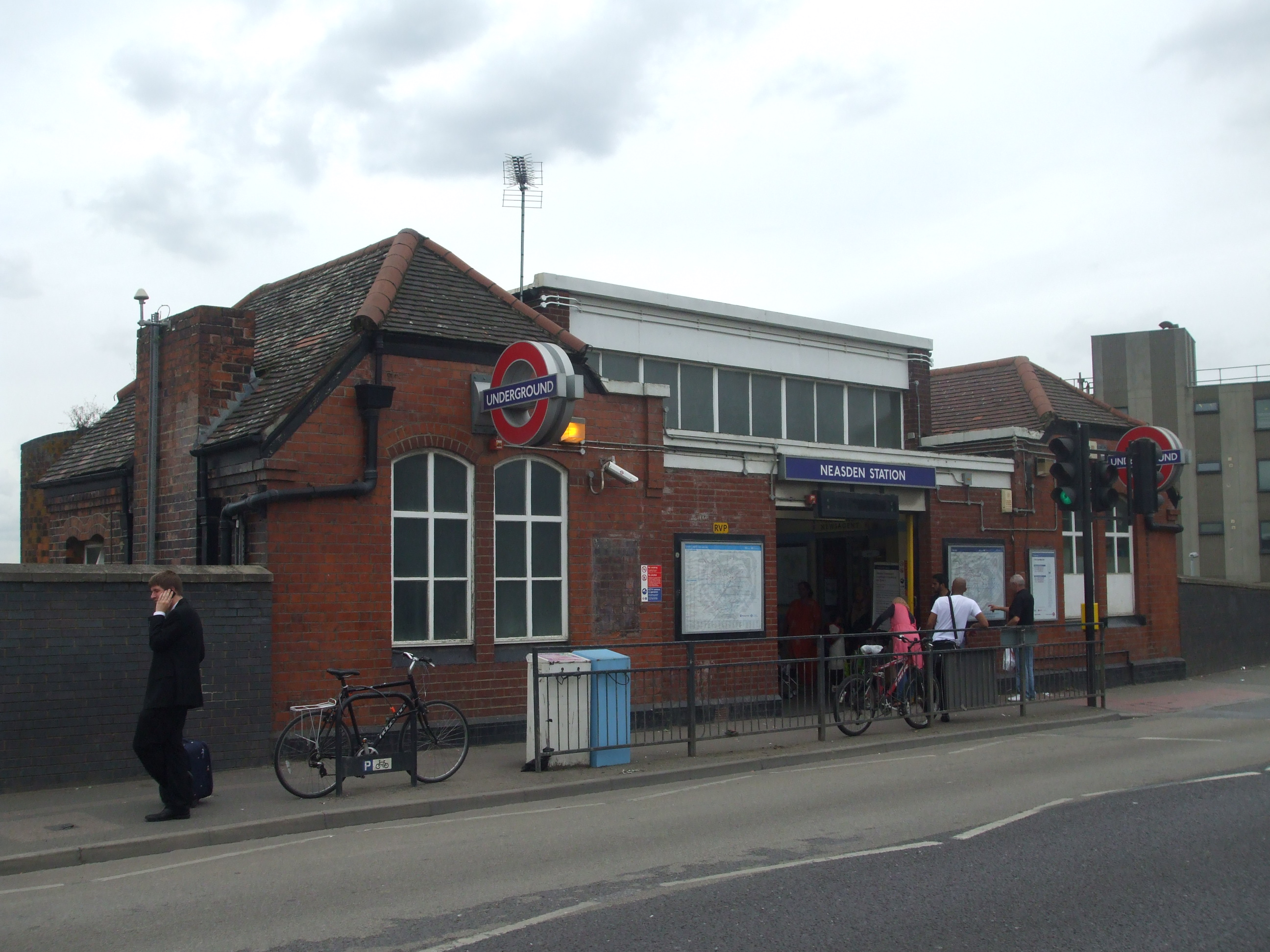
- Station entrance
- Interactive map of Neasden

General information
- Location: Neasden
- Local authority: London Borough of Brent
- Managed by: London Underground
- Number of platforms: 4 (2 in use)
- Fare zone: 3

London Underground annual entry and exit
- 2021: ▼1.56 million
- 2022: ▲2.49 million
- 2023: ▲2.57 million
- 2024: ▼2.53 million
- 2025: ▼2.51 million

Key dates
- 2 August 1880: Opened
- April 1958: Goods yard closed

Other information
- External links: TfL station info page
- Coordinates: 51.55417°N 0.25028°W

Neasden (/ˈniːzdən/) is a London Underground station in Neasden, north-west London. It is on the Jubilee line between Wembley Park and Dollis Hill stations, and is in London fare zone 3. Metropolitan line trains pass through the station but do not stop. The Chiltern Main Line/London to Aylesbury Line runs to the west of the station.

== History ==
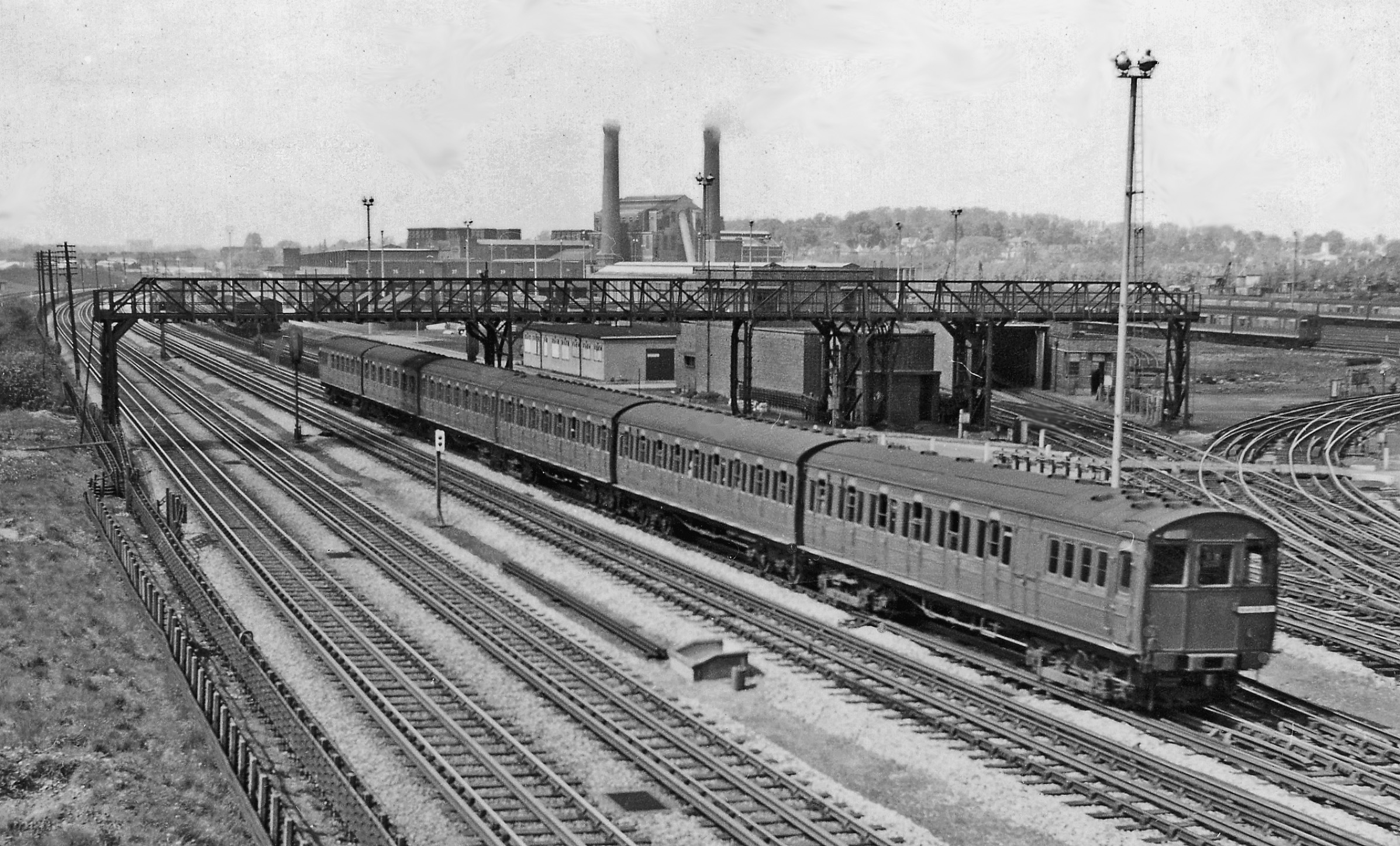
Up London Transport Metropolitan line electric train in 1959

The station opened on 2 August 1880 as part of the ongoing extensions to the Metropolitan Railway (this time to Harrow), with the name Kingsbury and Neasden. The name was changed to Neasden and Kingsbury in 1910, and then changed again to its current name Neasden in 1932, the same year Kingsbury station opened. After the Metropolitan Railway was taken into public ownership in 1933, train services to Stanmore were transferred to the new eastern branch of the Bakerloo line in 1939 and Metropolitan line trains ceased to stop at the station the following year. In 1979, the main service was transferred to the Jubilee line.

The station's surface building is located in Neasden Lane. It has been extensively modified over the years, losing its original roof and high chimneys in the late 20th century, and a segment of the front was rebuilt around 1993 to remove a newsagent previously placed there. As well as the ticket office there are three ticket collection barriers and a single luggage gate (these were installed in the late 1990s; prior to this there were no barriers and just a gate), and the station also has a shop. The stairs from the surface building lead to four platforms. Platforms 1 and 4 are on the Metropolitan line, served on a few days a year for local events and when necessary due to disruptions to normal services. Platforms 2 and 3 were the northbound and southbound platforms for the Bakerloo line and since 1979 are now used by the Jubilee line. The platforms are constructed to "transition height" to allow regular use by tube trains of the Jubilee line and occasional (early morning, late night and during work on the line) use by the larger Metropolitan Line trains.

Platforms 1, 2 and 3 were built originally in 1880. Neasden had three platforms, which was unusual for a small station. The reason for three platforms was that Neasden was a terminus for many local Metropolitan trains from London and which would be stabled in the nearby depot. Platforms 4 and 5 were built in 1914 as a result of the quadrupling of the Metropolitan between Finchley Road and Harrow-on-the-Hill. Platform 5 was used as a bay platform for trains terminating at Neasden from stations north on the Met such as Stanmore. This platform was removed later on and the track is now used as a relief siding for the depot.

Neasden is one of the few stations on the southern section of the former Metropolitan Main line to still have its original platform buildings intact and its architecture is typical for a station serving a medium-sized village. Baker Street and Willesden Green are the other stations to have their platform buildings intact. The line between Finchley Road and Harrow-on-the-Hill was quadrupled between 1914 and 1916, and many intermediate stations had to be rebuilt to enable the fast lines to be built. Jubilee line trains sometimes terminate at Neasden.

== Future ==
Transport for London has proposed building a new London Overground station adjacent to the Tube station as part of the planned West London Orbital line. Neasden railway station would provide interchange with Overground services running from Brent Cross West, via Old Oak Common, to Brentford.

== Nearby attractions ==
- Neasden Temple
- Wembley Stadium

== Connections ==
London Buses route 297 serves the station.

| Preceding station | London Underground | Following station |
|---|---|---|
| Wembley Park towards Stanmore | Jubilee line | Dollis Hill towards Stratford |
Former services
| Preceding station | London Underground | Following station |
| Wembley Park towards Stanmore | Bakerloo line Stanmore branch (1939–1979) | Dollis Hill towards Elephant & Castle |
| Wembley Park towards Stanmore | Metropolitan line Stanmore branch (1932–1939) | Dollis Hill towards Baker Street or Aldgate |
