= Willesden Green tube station =

London Underground station

Willesden Green
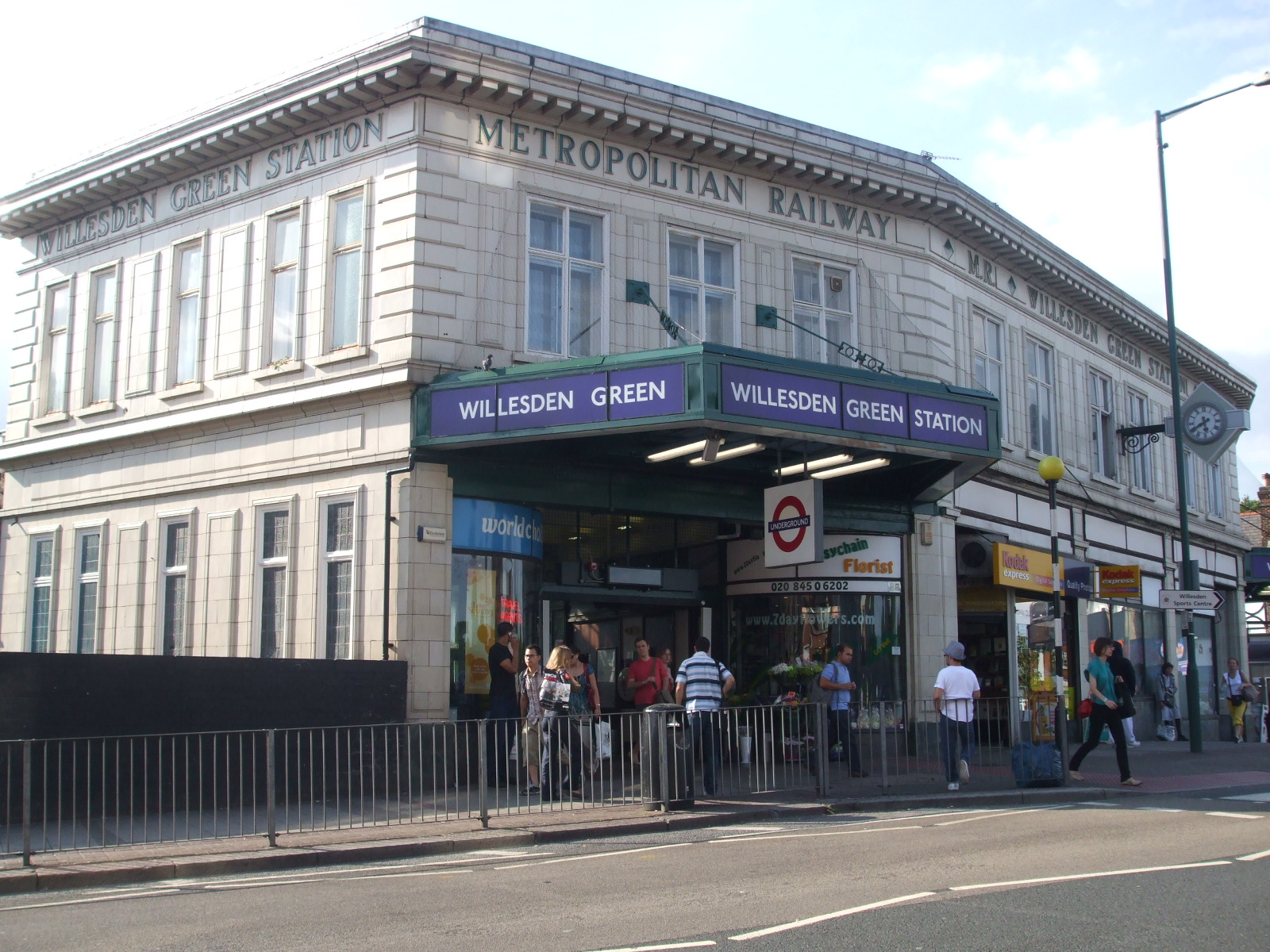
- Main building viewed from the south-east
- Interactive map of Willesden Green

General information
- Location: Willesden
- Local authority: London Borough of Brent
- Grid reference: TQ233849
- Managed by: London Underground
- Number of platforms: 4
- Fare zone: 2 and 3

London Underground annual entry and exit
- 2020: ▼4.29 million
- 2021: ▼3.38 million
- 2022: ▲5.35 million
- 2023: ▲5.43 million
- 2024: ▲5.56 million

Railway companies
- Original company: Metropolitan Railway

Key dates
- 24 November 1879: Opened as Willesden Green
- 1 June 1894: Renamed Willesden Green and Cricklewood
- 1938: Renamed Willesden Green
- 20 November 1939: Bakerloo line service introduced
- 7 December 1940: Metropolitan line service withdrawn
- 3 January 1966: Goods yard closed
- 1 May 1979: Bakerloo line service replaced by Jubilee line

Listed status
- Listing grade: II
- Entry number: 1391808
- Added to list: 7 November 2006; 19 years ago

Other information
- External links: TfL station info page
- Coordinates: 51.54917°N 0.22167°W

Willesden Green (/ˈwɪlzdən ˈɡriːn/) is a London Underground station. It is located on Walm Lane in Willesden, London. The station is on the Jubilee line, between Dollis Hill and Kilburn stations. It is in both London fare zone 2 and 3.

Metropolitan line trains typically bypass the station without stopping at it.

== History ==
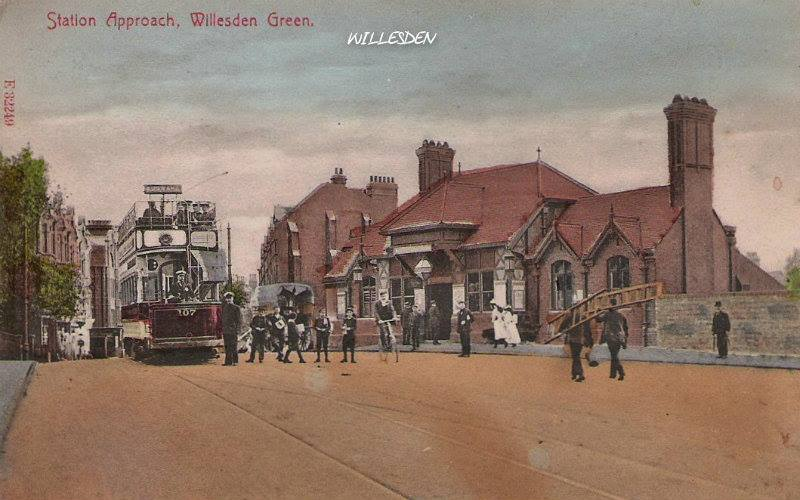
The original Willesden Green station

The original station opened on 24 November 1879 on the Metropolitan Railway (later the Metropolitan line). From 1894 to 1938, the station was known as Willesden Green and Cricklewood. From 20 November 1939, it also served the Stanmore branch of the Bakerloo line, with Met services being withdrawn in the following year. It transferred to the Jubilee line in 1979. A connecting tunnel at Embankment station mistakenly shows Willesden Green as part of the Bakerloo line, as a result of a typo which should say Willesden Junction instead; this can be found on a printed map on the wall of Embankment station.

The new main station buildings, which date from the reconstruction of 1925, are fine examples of the work of Charles Walter Clark, the Metropolitan Railway's architect, who used this style of marble white faience for several 'central' area stations. The diamond-shaped clock is also a trademark of his style. The ticket hall interior retains much of the rare original green tesserae mosaic tiling and was one of the reasons that led to the station being made a Grade II Listed Building in December 2006.

Willesden Green is one of the few stations on the southern section of the former Metropolitan main line still to have its original platform buildings intact and its architecture is typical for a station serving a medium-sized town; Baker Street and Neasden are the other stations to have their platform buildings intact. The line between Finchley Road and Harrow-on-the-Hill was quadrupled between 1914 and 1916, and many intermediate stations had to be rebuilt to enable the fast lines to be built.

A goods yard, which was in use until 1966, was located to the north of the station. From 1933, when the London Passenger Transport Board (LPTB) took over service, trains from the north would be run by the LNER to Neasden Depot where they would be then hauled by LPTB steam locos to Willesden.

From the beginning of October 2022 to September 2023, this station was used to trial an artificial intelligence that would detect events such as fare evasion, anti-social behaviour and injured persons. This was done by installing a processing device that had access to the CCTV cameras present in the station.

== Services ==
Willesden Green station is on the Jubilee line in London fare zones 2 and 3. It is between Dollis Hill to the north and Kilburn to the south. There is a frequent Jubilee line service at Willesden Green. Trains heading southbound terminate at North Greenwich or Stratford. It previously served Charing Cross until 1999, when the Jubilee line extension isolated the station from the rest of the line. Those heading northbound either terminate here, at Wembley Park or Stanmore. Willesden Green, as well as all the other Jubilee line stations, is also served as part of the Night Tube, which is run overnight on Fridays and Saturdays.

The station still has side platforms for the Metropolitan line who bypass the station without stopping at it, but these are not in regular use and are only used when the Jubilee line is not serving the station due to planned engineering works or severe service disruption.

== Connections ==
London Buses routes 260, 266 and 460 serve the station.

Preceding station	London Underground	Following station
Dollis Hill towards Stanmore	Jubilee line	Kilburn towards Stratford
Former services
Preceding station	London Underground	Following station
Dollis Hill towards Stanmore	Bakerloo line Stanmore branch (1939–1979)	Kilburn towards Elephant & Castle
Dollis Hill towards Stanmore	Metropolitan line Stanmore branch (1932–1939)	Kilburn towards Baker Street or Aldgate
