= List of British heritage and private railways =

This is a list of heritage, private and preserved railways throughout the United Kingdom, the Crown dependencies, and British Overseas Territories whether operational or closed, that are operated for charitable purposes or shareholder profit. Some also provide economic local transport. For rail museums, see List of British railway museums.

Interactive map of standard gauge heritage railways in Great Britain.

Interactive map of miniature heritage railways in Great Britain.

Many of the standard-gauge railways listed, including former branch lines and ex-mainline routes, were closed by British Railways under the Beeching Axe of the 1960s. Most have been restored and operate as heritage lines. A smaller number of lines were formerly industrial or colliery railways.

Many of these preserved railways are mentioned in national and international tour guides, and visits may form part of a school curriculum or feature in other studies, including civil engineering, mechanics, social, economic and political history, visual arts and drama.

This list also includes tramways. Nearly all tram services in Britain ended in the 1950s and early 1960s, leaving just Blackpool Corporation Tramways, although some big cities have since revived them in the late 20th century onwards.

This list includes those railways which have public open days and excludes those on private sites which are not advertised to the public.

== England ==
=== Northern England ===
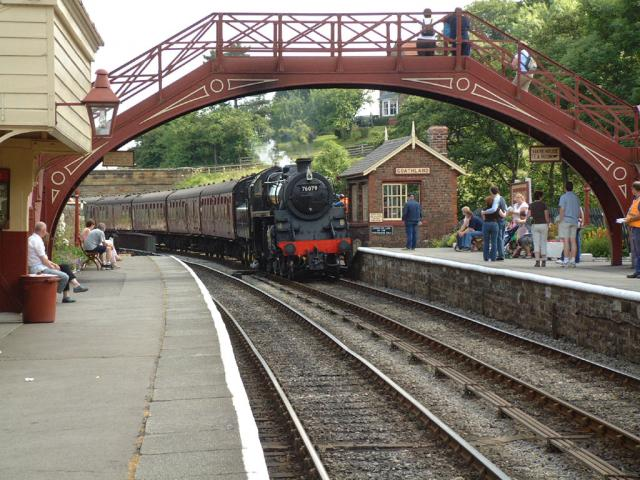
Goathland station on the North Yorkshire Moors Railway

==== Standard gauge ====
- Aln Valley Railway, Alnwick, Northumberland
- Bowes Railway, Tyne and Wear
- Derwent Valley Light Railway, Murton, North Yorkshire
- East Lancashire Railway, Bury, Greater Manchester
- Eden Valley Railway, Warcop, Cumbria
- Embsay and Bolton Abbey Steam Railway, Embsay, North Yorkshire
- Keighley & Worth Valley Railway, Haworth, West Yorkshire
- Lakeside and Haverthwaite Railway, Haverthwaite, nr Staveley, Cumbria
- Middleton Railway, Hunslet, West Yorkshire
- North Tyneside Steam Railway, North Shields, Tyne and Wear
- North Yorkshire Moors Railway, Pickering, North Yorkshire
- Ribble Steam Railway, Preston, Lancashire
- Stainmore Railway, Kirkby Stephen, Cumbria
- Tanfield Railway, Marley Hill, County Durham
- Weardale Railway, Stanhope, County Durham
- Wensleydale Railway, Leeming Bar, North Yorkshire
- Yorkshire Wolds Railway, Sledmere–Fimber, East Yorkshire

==== Railway centres and museums ====
- Beamish Museum & Railway Centre, County Durham
- Carnforth Railway Centre, Carnforth, Lancashire - private site
- Crewe Heritage Centre, Crewe, Cheshire
- Head of Steam, Darlington, County Durham
- Heaton Park Tramway Museum, Manchester, Greater Manchester
- Leeds Industrial Museum, Armley, West Yorkshire
- Locomotion, Shildon, County Durham
- National Railway Museum, York, North Yorkshire
- Science and Industry Museum, Liverpool Road, Manchester
- South Yorkshire Transport Museum, Aldwarke, Rotherham, South Yorkshire
- Stephenson Railway Museum, West Chirton, Tyne and Wear

==== Narrow gauge ====
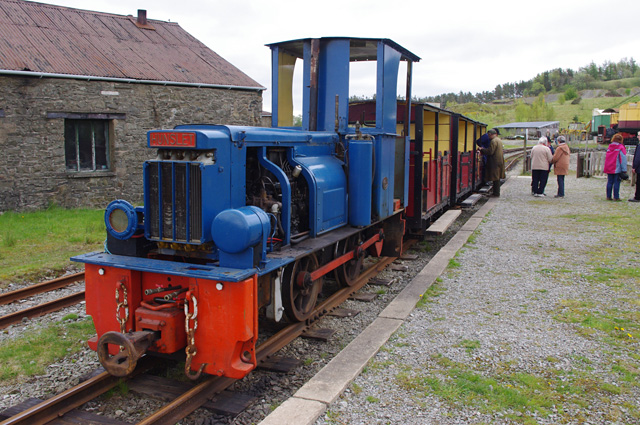
The Threlkeld Quarry Railway in 2013

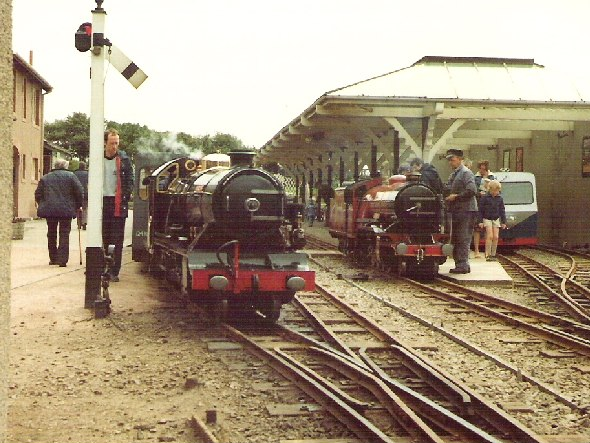
The Ravenglass & Eskdale Railway in 1981

- Heatherslaw Light Railway, Northumberland
- Ravenglass & Eskdale Railway, Cumbria
- South Tynedale Railway between Alston, Cumbria and Slaggyford, Northumberland
- Threlkeld Quarry Railway, Cumbria
- West Lancashire Light Railway, Hesketh Bank, Lancashire
- Woodhorn Narrow Gauge Railway, Ashington, Northumberland

==== Miniature ====
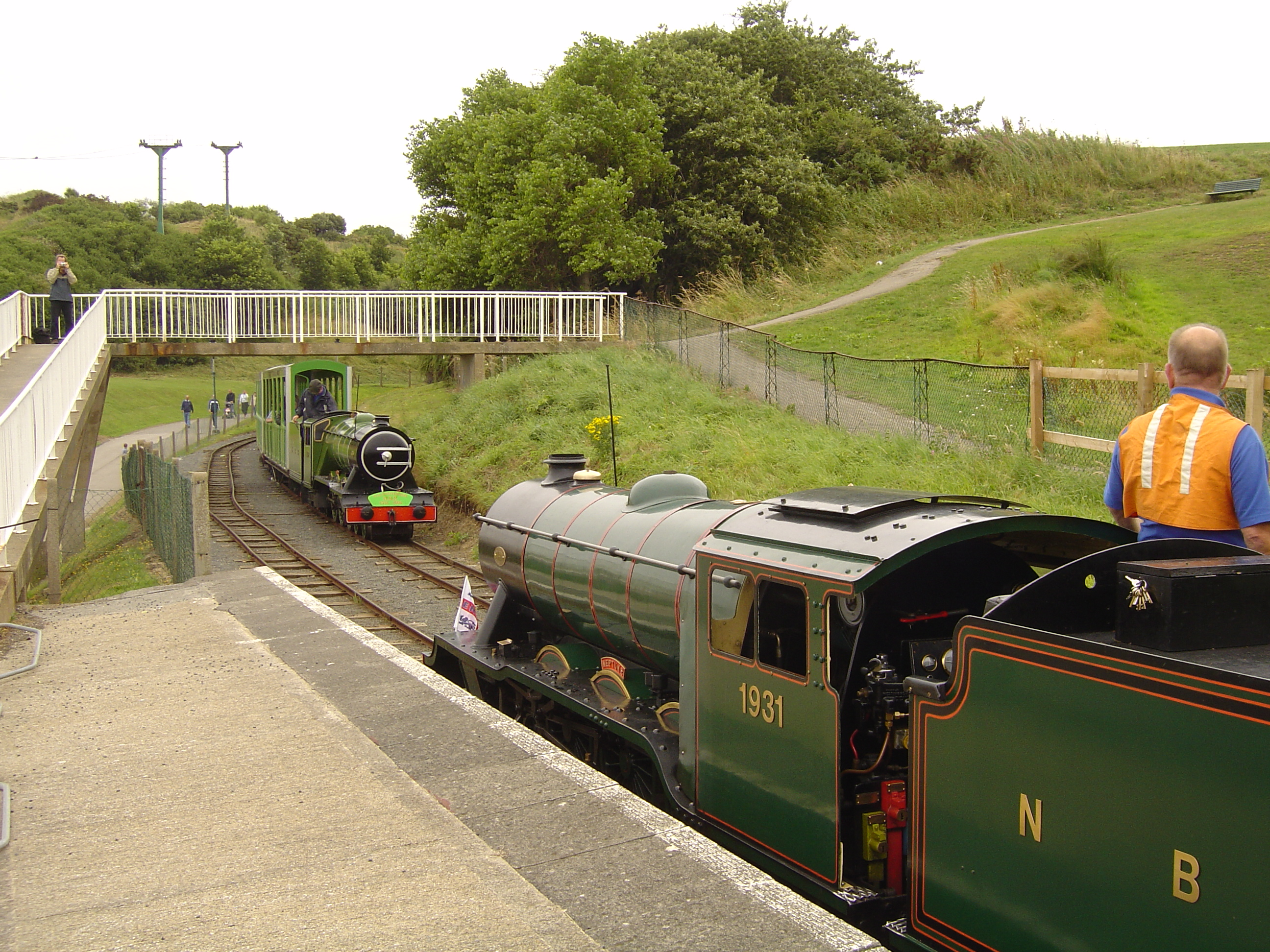
The North Bay Railway

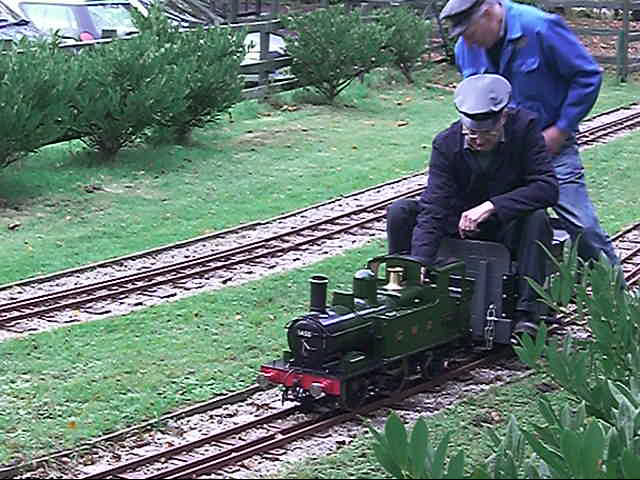
Miniature Railway in Royden Park

- All in one Miniature Railway, Knutsford nr Allostock, Cheshire
- Blackpool Zoo Railway, Blackpool, Lancashire
- Brookside Miniature Railway, Poynton, Cheshire
- Croxteth Country Park miniature railway, Liverpool
- Dragon Miniature Railway, Marple, nr Stockport, Greater Manchester
- Eaton Hall Railway, Cheshire – private site
- Halton Miniature Railway, Runcorn, Cheshire
- High Legh Miniature Railway, High Legh, Cheshire
- Knowsley Safari Park Railway, Knowsley, Merseyside
- Lakeside Miniature Railway, Pleasureland Southport, Merseyside
- North Bay Railway, Scarborough, North Yorkshire
- Pleasure Beach Express, Blackpool Pleasure Beach, Lancashire
- Teesside Small Gauge Railway, Preston Park, Stockton-on-Tees
- Pugneys Light Railway, Wakefield, West Yorkshire
- Saltburn Miniature Railway, Saltburn, North Yorkshire
- South Park Miniature Railway, Cheadle Hulme, Greater Manchester
- Thorpe Light Railway, Whorlton, County Durham
- Walton Park Miniature Railway, Sale, Greater Manchester
- Whistlestop Valley, Clayton West, West Yorkshire
- Windmill Farm Railway, Burscough, Lancashire
- Wirral Model Engineering Society, Royden Park, Wirral, Merseyside

==== Tramways ====
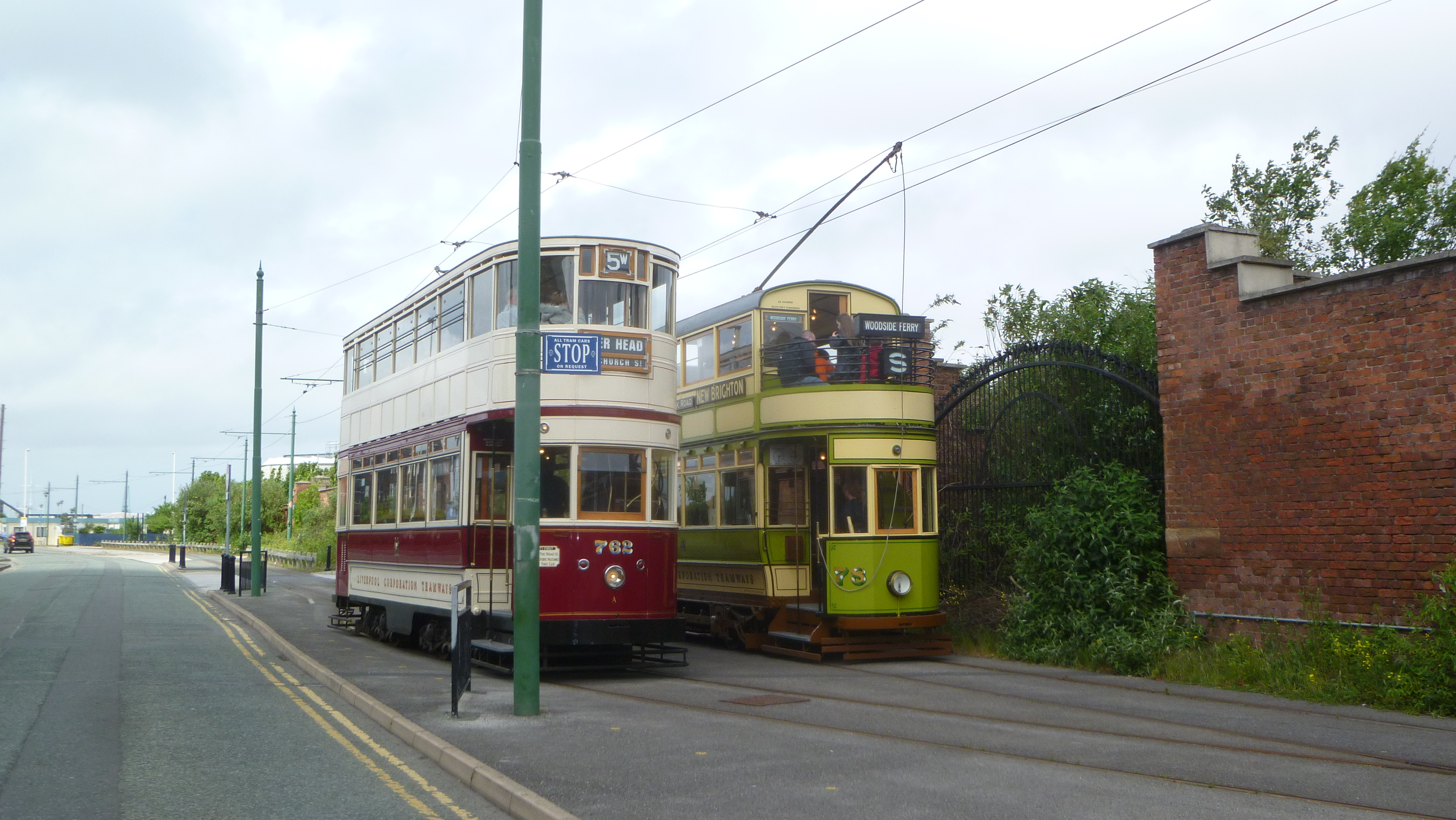
Wirral Tramway

- Beamish Museum, County Durham
- Bradford Industrial Museum, Eccleshill, (nr Bradford), West Yorkshire
- Heaton Park Tramway, Manchester, Greater Manchester
- Shipley Glen Tramway, Shipley, West Yorkshire
- Wirral Transport Museum and Heritage Tramway, Birkenhead, Merseyside

=== East of England ===
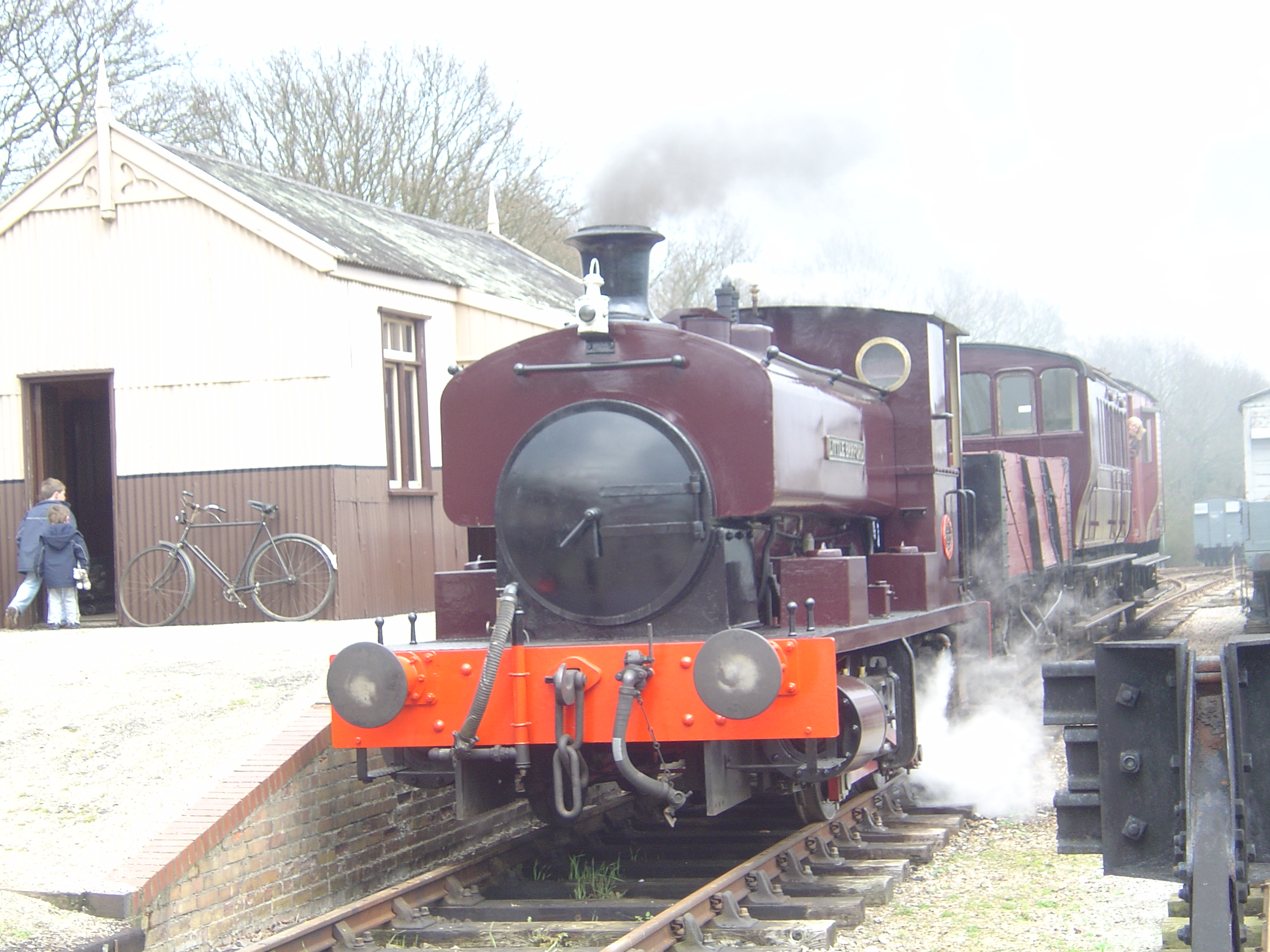
Mixed train on the Mid-Suffolk Light Railway

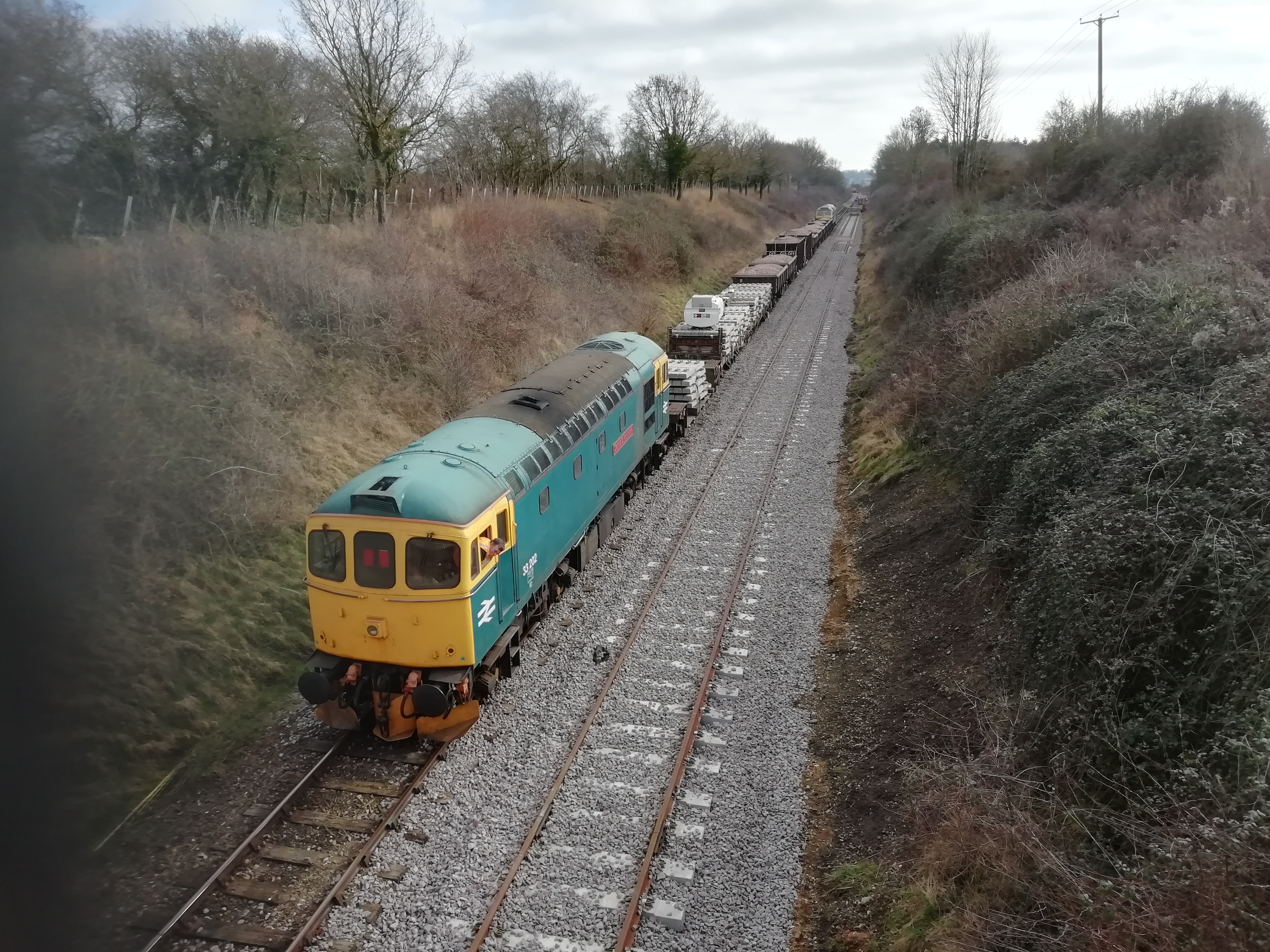
Restored double track section on the Mid-Norfolk Railway

==== Standard gauge ====
- Colne Valley Railway, Castle Hedingham, Essex
- Epping Ongar Railway, Ongar, Essex
- Mid-Norfolk Railway, Dereham, Norfolk
- Mid Suffolk Light Railway, Brockford, Suffolk
- Nene Valley Railway, Wansford, Cambridgeshire
- North Norfolk Railway, Sheringham, Norfolk

==== Railway centres and museums ====
- Bressingham Steam and Gardens, Diss, Norfolk
- East Anglian Railway Museum, Chappel & Wakes Colne Station, Essex
- Mangapps Railway Museum, Burnham-on-Crouch, Essex
- Railworld Wildlife Haven, Peterborough, Cambridgeshire
- Whitwell & Reepham Railway, Reepham, Norfolk

==== Narrow gauge ====
- Bressingham Steam and Gardens, Diss, Norfolk
- Bure Valley Railway, Aylsham, Norfolk
- Great Whipsnade Railway, Whipsnade Zoo, Bedfordshire
- Leighton Buzzard Light Railway, Bedfordshire
- Southend Pier Railway, Southend-on-Sea, Essex
- Southwold Steamworks, Southwold, Suffolk
- Gunpowder Railway at Waltham Abbey Royal Gunpowder Mills, Essex
- Yaxham Light Railway, Norfolk – private site

==== Miniature ====
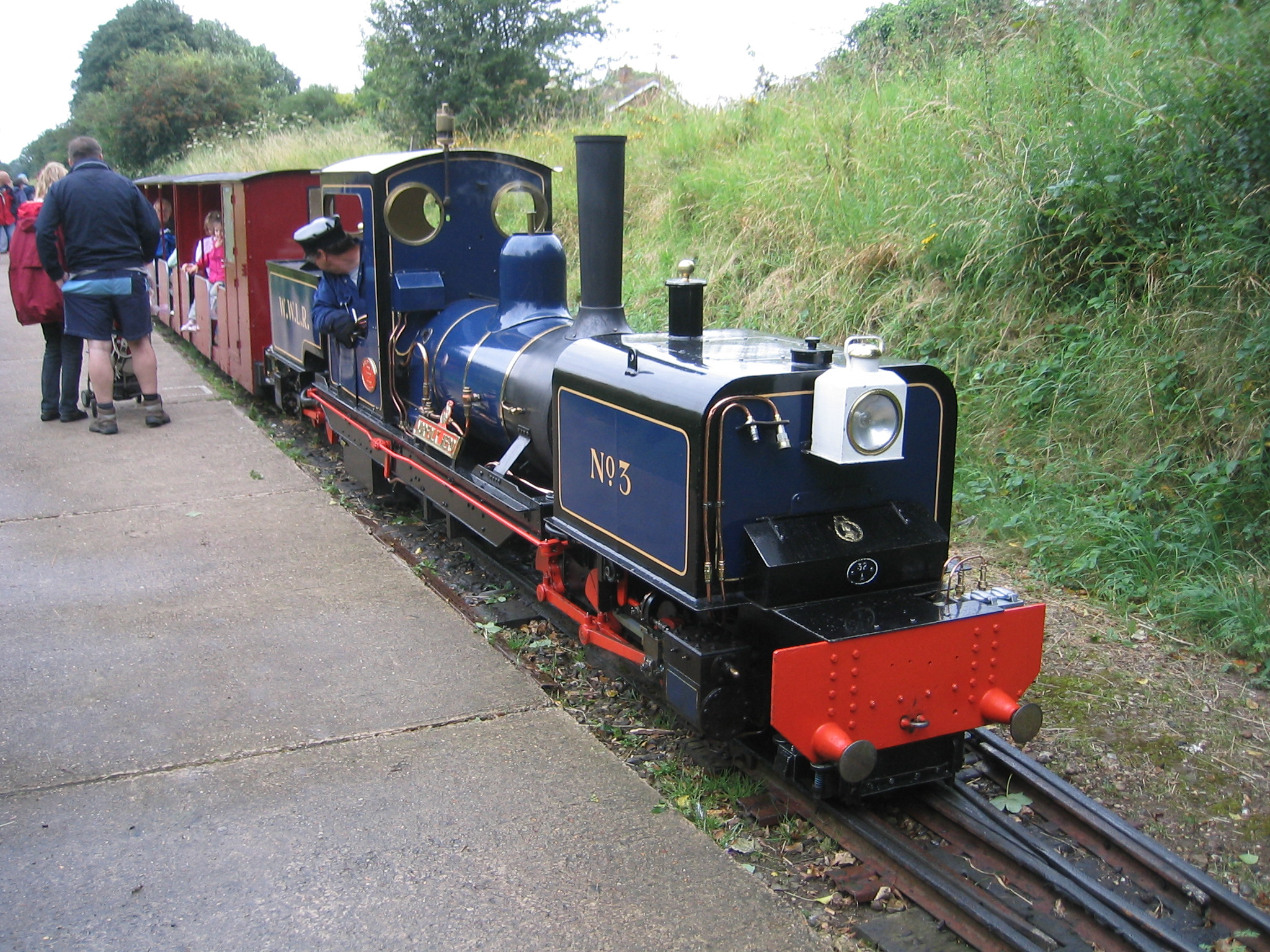
The Wells and Walsingham Light Railway

- Audley End Railway, Essex
- Bushey Miniature Railway, Bushey, Hertfordshire
- East Herts Miniature Railway, Ware, Hertfordshire
- Eaton Park Miniature Railway, Norwich, Norfolk
- Fancott Miniature Railway, Bedfordshire
- Rex Express, Paradise Wildlife Park, Hertfordshire
- Riverside Miniature Railway, St Neots, Cambridgeshire
- Great Woburn Railway, Woburn, Bedfordshire
- Wells & Walsingham Light Railway, Wells-next-the-Sea, Norfolk

==== Tramways ====
- East Anglia Transport Museum, Lowestoft, Suffolk

=== East Midlands ===
==== Standard gauge ====
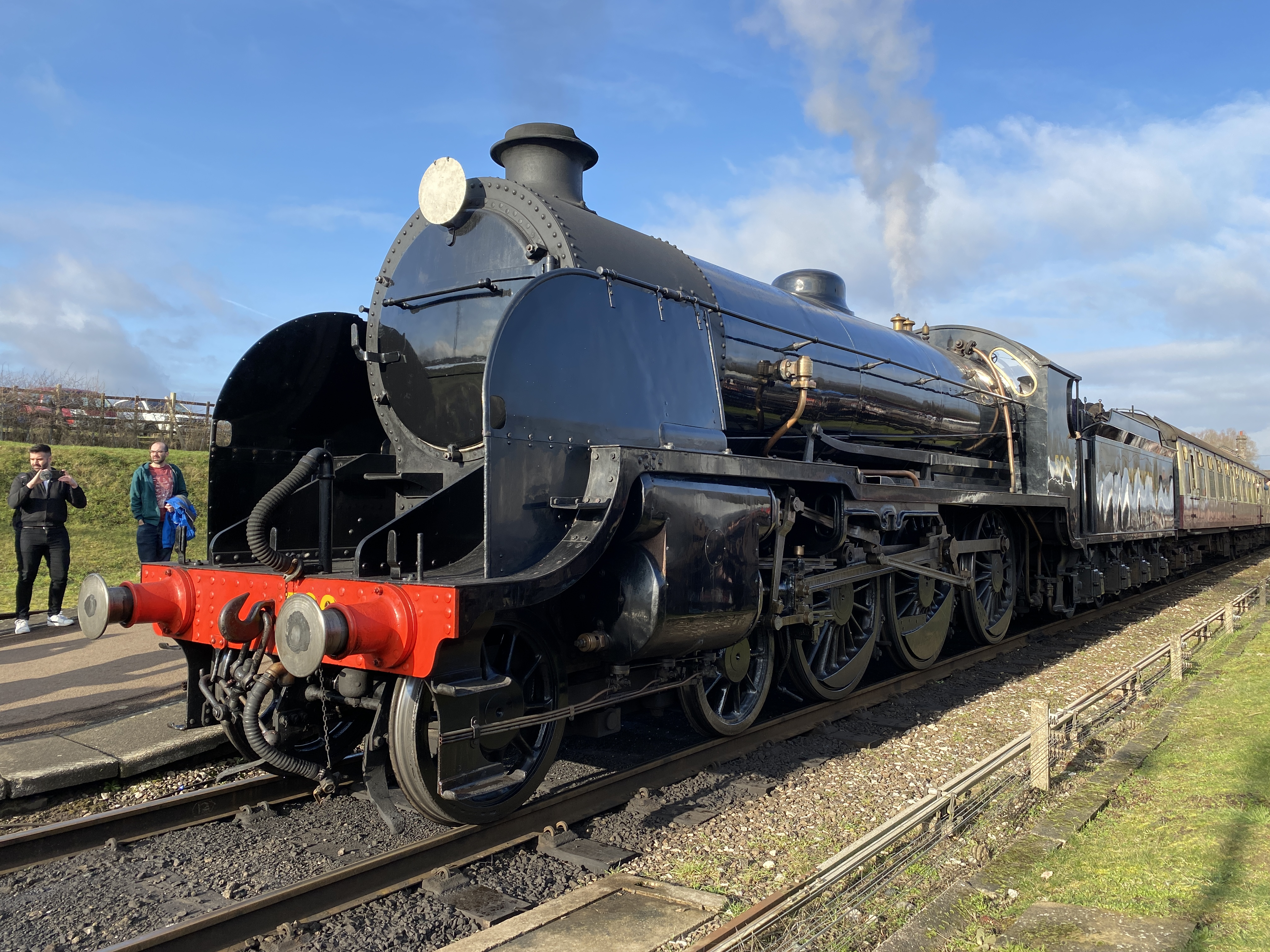
Great Central Railway (heritage railway).

- Battlefield Line, Shackerstone, Leicestershire
- Ecclesbourne Valley Railway, Wirksworth, Derbyshire
- Great Central Railway, Loughborough, Leicestershire
- Great Central Railway (Nottingham), Ruddington, Nottinghamshire
- Lincolnshire Wolds Railway, Ludborough, Lincolnshire
- Midland Railway – Butterley, Derbyshire
- Mountsorrel Railway, Mountsorrel, Leicestershire
- Northampton & Lamport Railway, Pitsford and Brampton, Northamptonshire
- Northants Ironstone Railway, Hunsbury Hill, Northamptonshire
- Peak Rail, Matlock, Derbyshire
- Rushden, Higham & Wellingborough Railway, Rushden, Northamptonshire

==== Railway centres and museums ====
- Appleby Frodingham Railway, Scunthorpe, Lincolnshire
- Barrow Hill Roundhouse, Barrow Hill nr Chesterfield, Derbyshire
- Nottingham Heritage Railway, Ruddington, Nottinghamshire
- Rutland Railway Museum, Cottesmore, Rutland

==== Narrow gauge ====
- Abbey Pumping Station Railway Leicester, Leicestershire
- Billing Aquadrome Miniature Railway, Great Billing, Northamptonshire
- Cleethorpes Coast Light Railway, Lincolnshire
- Crowle Peatland Railway, Crowle, North Lincolnshire
- Derbyshire Dales Narrow Gauge Railway, Rowsley, Derbyshire
- Golden Valley Light Railway, Butterley, Derbyshire
- Irchester Narrow Gauge Railway Museum, Irchester, Wellingborough, Northamptonshire
- Lincolnshire Coast Light Railway, Skegness, Lincolnshire
- North Ings Farm Railway, Lincolnshire
- Sherwood Forest Railway, Nottinghamshire
- Steeple Grange Light Railway, Wirksworth, Derbyshire
- Wicksteed Park Railway, Kettering, Northamptonshire

==== Miniature ====
- Evergreens Miniature Railway, Keal Cotes, Lincolnshire
- Mablethorpe Miniature Railway, Queens Park, Mablethorpe, Lincolnshire
- Stapleford Miniature Railway, near Melton Mowbray, Leicestershire

==== Tramways ====
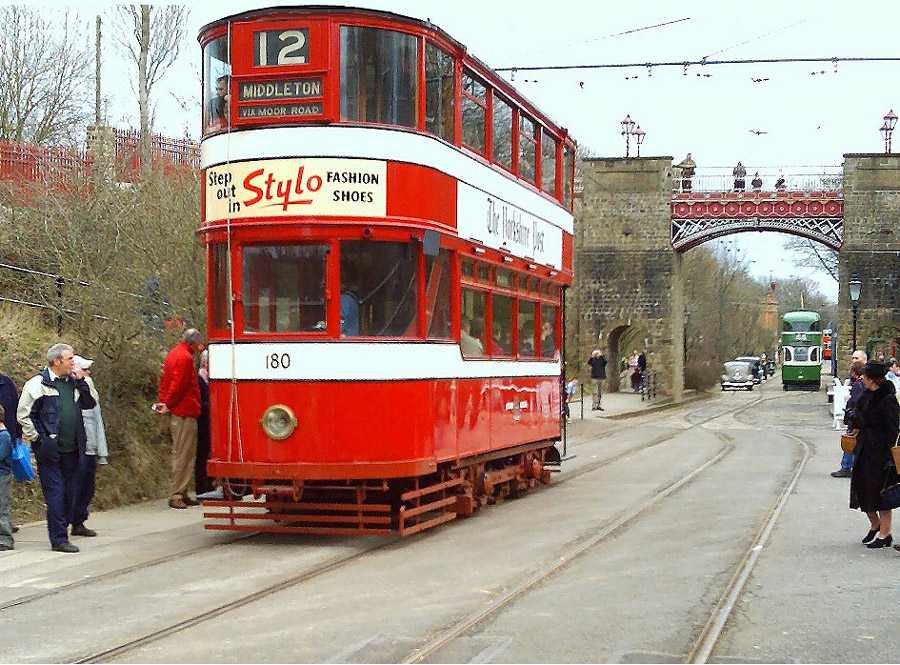
A 1931 Leeds tram seen at Crich Tramway Village in 2004

- National Tramway Museum, Crich, Derbyshire

=== South East ===
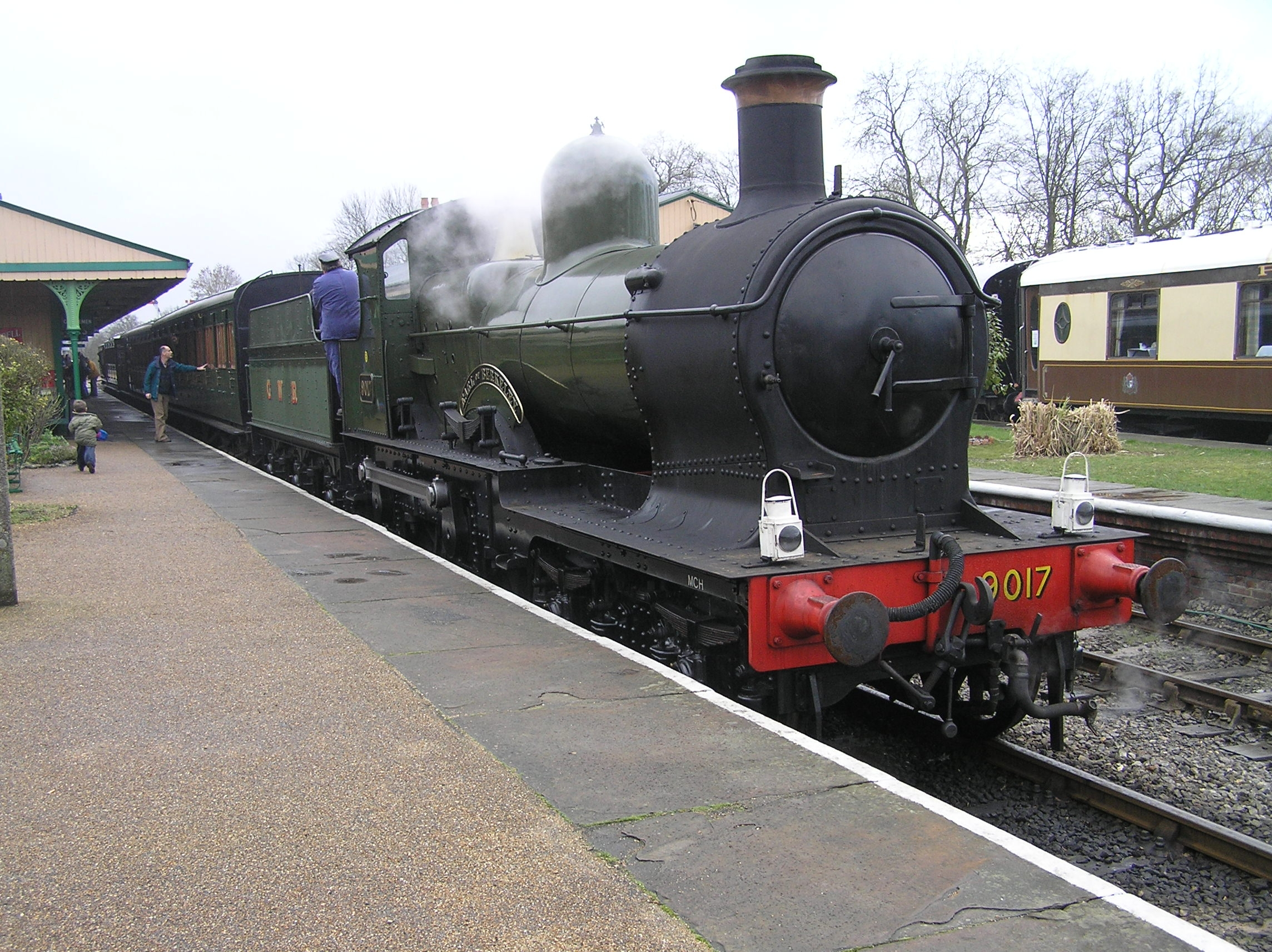
GWR Earl of Berkeley at Horsted Keynes Station, Bluebell Railway

==== Standard gauge ====
- Bluebell Railway, Sheffield Park, Sussex
- Chinnor & Princes Risborough Railway, Chinnor, Oxfordshire / Princes Risborough, Buckinghamshire
- Cholsey and Wallingford Railway, Wallingford, Oxfordshire
- East Kent Railway, Shepherdswell, Kent
- Isle of Wight Steam Railway, Havenstreet, Isle of Wight
- Kent and East Sussex Railway, Tenterden, Kent
- Lavender Line, Isfield, East Sussex
- Rother Valley Railway, Robertsbridge, East Sussex (line extension under construction)
- Spa Valley Railway, Royal Tunbridge Wells, Kent
- Watercress Line, New Alresford, Hampshire

==== Railway centres and museums ====
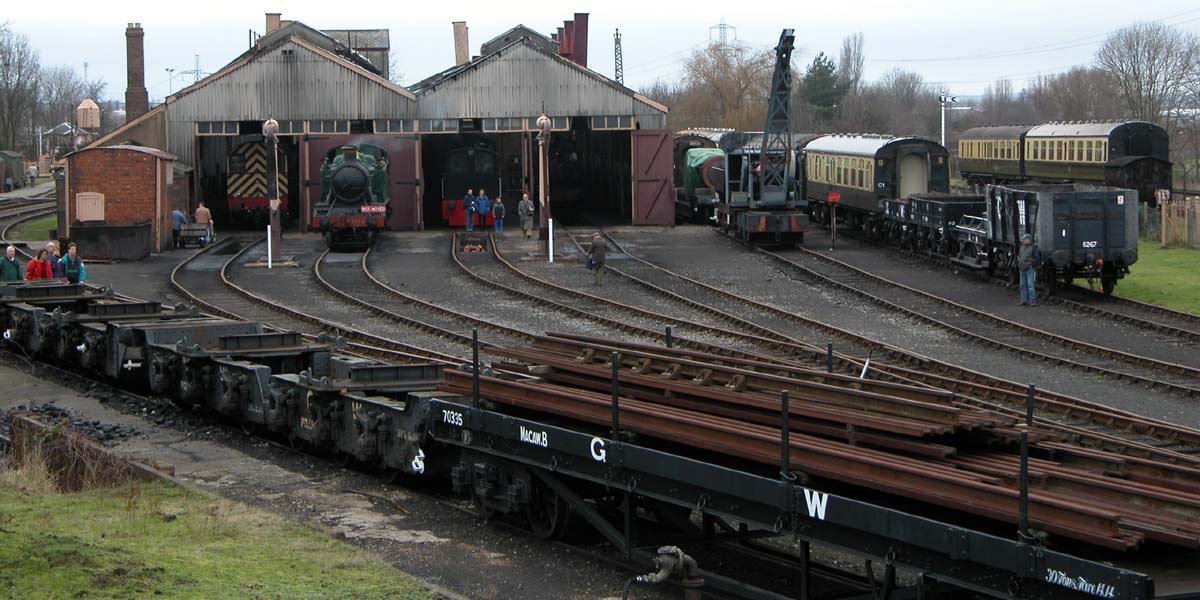
The engine sheds at Didcot Railway Centre

- Buckinghamshire Railway Centre, Quainton, Aylesbury, Buckinghamshire
- Chatham Historic Dockyard Railway, Kent
- Colonel Stephens Railway Museum, Tenterden, Kent
- Didcot Railway Centre, Didcot, Oxfordshire
- London Transport Museum, Covent Garden, Central London
- London Transport Museum, Acton Depot, West London- private site but occasional public open days
- One:One collection, Hornby Hobbies, Margate, Kent- private site but occasional public open days
- Southall Railway Centre, Southall, West London- private site

==== Narrow gauge ====
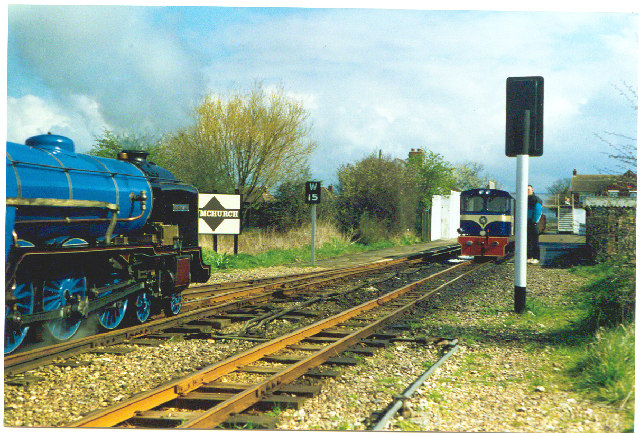
Trains on the Romney, Hythe & Dymchurch Railway

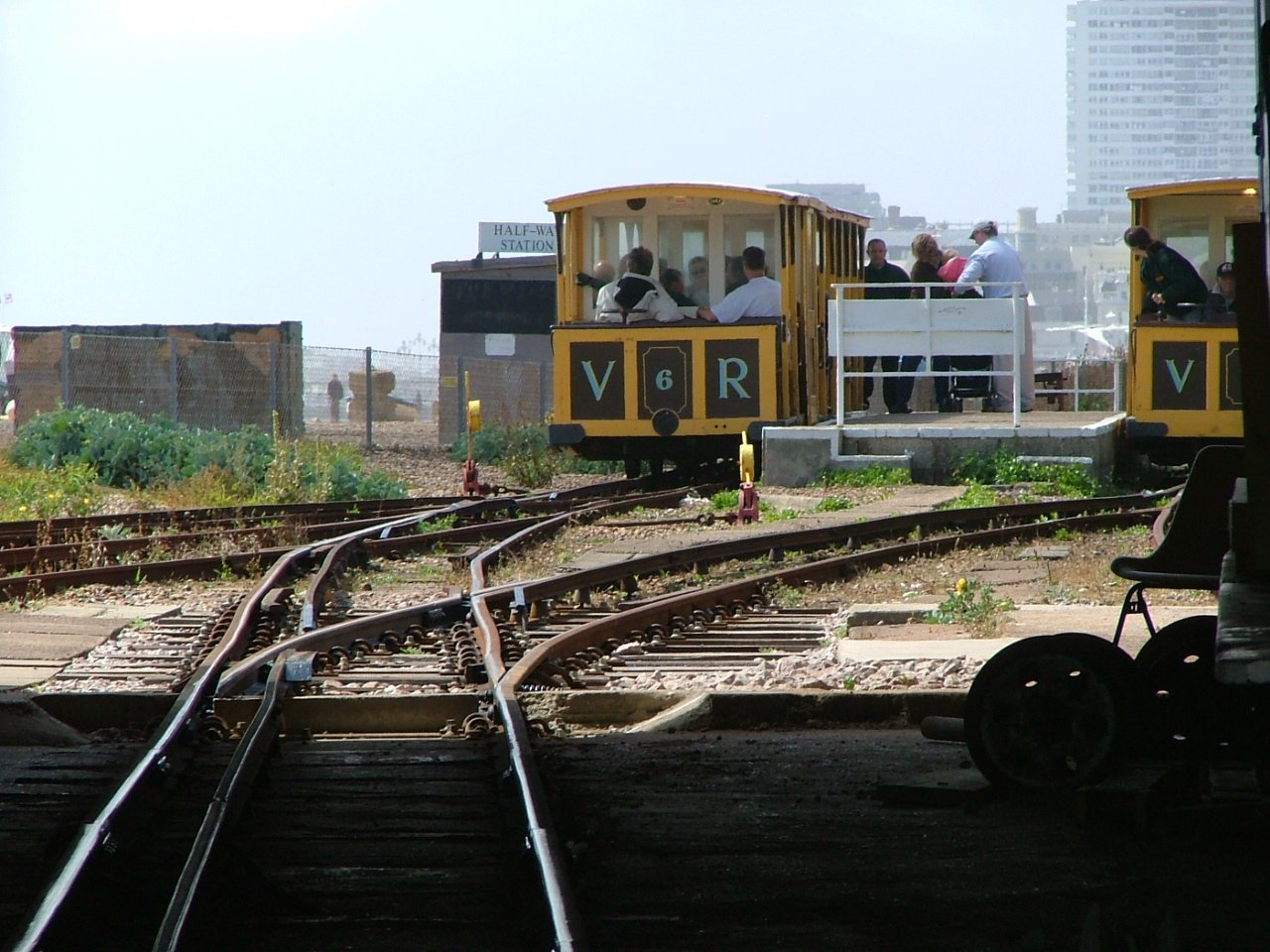
The Volks Electric Railway

- Amberley Museum Railway, Amberley, West Sussex
- Bredgar & Wormshill Light Railway, near Sittingbourne, Kent
- Exbury Gardens Railway, Beaulieu, Hampshire
- Great Bush Railway, Tinkers Park, Hadlow Down, East Sussex
- Hampton & Kempton Waterworks Railway, Hanworth/Hampton, London.
- Hayling Seaside Railway, Hayling Island, Hampshire
- Hollycombe Steam Collection, near Liphook, Hampshire
- Hythe Pier Ferry Railway, Hampshire
- London Museum of Water & Steam, Kew Bridge, Brentford, London
- Mail Rail, short section of the former London Post Office Railway opened to public since 2017
- Old Kiln Light Railway, Rural Life Centre, Reeds Road, Tilford, Farnham, Surrey
- Romney, Hythe & Dymchurch Railway, Kent
- Sittingbourne & Kemsley Light Railway, Kent
- Volk's Electric Railway, Brighton, East Sussex

==== Miniature ====
- Ascot Locomotive Society, Ascot, Berkshire
- Bankside Miniature Railway, Eastleigh, Hampshire
- Barking Park Light Railway, Barking, London
- Bekonscot Light Railway, Beaconsfield, Buckinghamshire
- Bentley Miniature Railway, near Uckfield, East Sussex.
- Blenheim Park Railway, Blenheim Palace, Oxfordshire
- Beech Hurst Park Miniature Railway, Haywards Heath, West Sussex
- Crowborough Miniature Railway, Crowborough, East Sussex
- Eastbourne Miniature Steam Railway, Eastbourne, East Sussex
- Eastleigh Lakeside Railway, Hampshire
- Faversham Miniature Railway, Brogdale Farm, Faversham, Kent
- Frimley Lodge Park Railway, Surrey
- Great Cockcrow Railway, Chertsey, Surrey
- Harlington Locomotive Society, Hayes, Middlesex
- Hastings Miniature Railway, Hastings Seafront, East Sussex
- Ickenham Miniature Railway, Ickenham, London
- Jocks Lane Miniature Railway, Bracknell, Berkshire
- Leatherhead Model Railway, Leatherhead, Surrey
- Littlehampton Miniature Railway, Littlehampton, West Sussex
- Malden District Society of Model Engineers, Thames Ditton, Surrey
- Moors Valley Railway, near Ringwood, Hampshire
- Pinewood Model Railway, Pinewood, Crowthorne
- Reading Society of Model Engineers, Reading Berkshire
- Royal Victoria Railway, Southampton, Hampshire
- Ruislip Lido Railway, Ruislip, London
- South Downs Light Railway, Pulborough, West Sussex
- Swanley New Barn Railway, Swanley, Kent
- Watford Miniature Railway, Cassiobury Park, Watford, Hertfordshire
- Wellington Country Park Miniature Railway, near Riseley, Hampshire
- Woking Miniature Railway, Knaphill, Surrey

=== South West ===
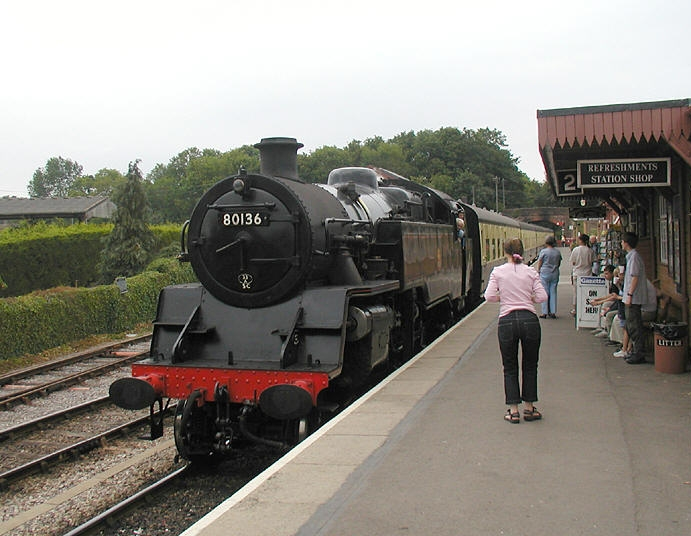
Bishops Lydeard station on the West Somerset Railway

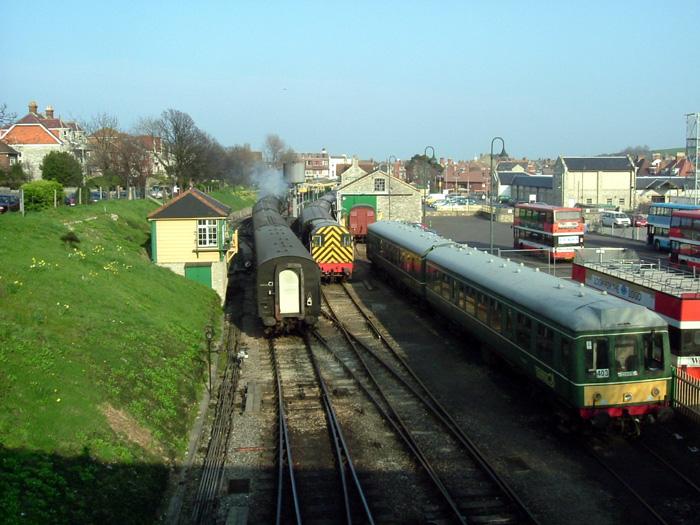
A general view of the Swanage Railway

==== Standard gauge ====
- Avon Valley Railway, Bitton, South Gloucestershire
- Bodmin & Wenford Railway, Bodmin, Cornwall
- Dartmouth Steam Railway, Paignton, Devon
- Dean Forest Railway, Norchard, Gloucestershire
- East Somerset Railway, Cranmore, Somerset
- Helston Railway, Prospidnick, Cornwall
- North Dorset Railway, Shillingstone, Dorset
- Plym Valley Railway, Marsh Mills, Plympton, Devon
- Somerset & Dorset Railway, Midsomer Norton, Somerset
- South Devon Railway, Buckfastleigh, Devon
- Swanage Railway, Swanage, Dorset
- Swindon & Cricklade Railway, Blunsdon, Wiltshire
- Tarka Valley Railway, Great Torrington, Devon
- West Somerset Railway, Minehead, Somerset

==== Railway centres and museums ====
- Bideford Railway Heritage Centre, Bideford, Devon
- Bovey Tracey Heritage Centre, Bovey Tracey, Devon
- Bristol Harbour Railway, Bristol
- Steam – Museum of the Great Western Railway, Swindon, Wiltshire
- Yeovil Railway Centre, Yeovil Junction station, Somerset

==== Narrow gauge ====
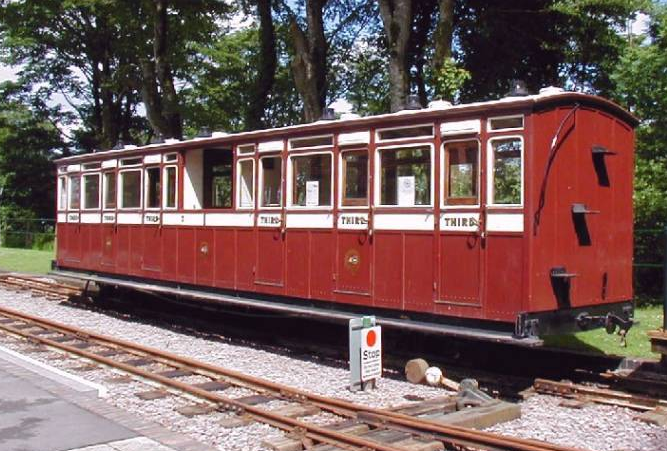
Restored Victorian coach at the Lynton & Barnstaple Railway

- Bicton Woodland Railway, Devon
- Devon Railway Centre, Bickleigh, Devon
- Exmoor Steam Railway, Devon – private site
- Gartell Light Railway, Templecombe, Somerset
- Launceston Steam Railway, Launceston, Cornwall
- Lynbarn Railway, Devon
- Lynton & Barnstaple Railway, Woody Bay, Devon
- Morwellham Quay Open Air Museum, Devon

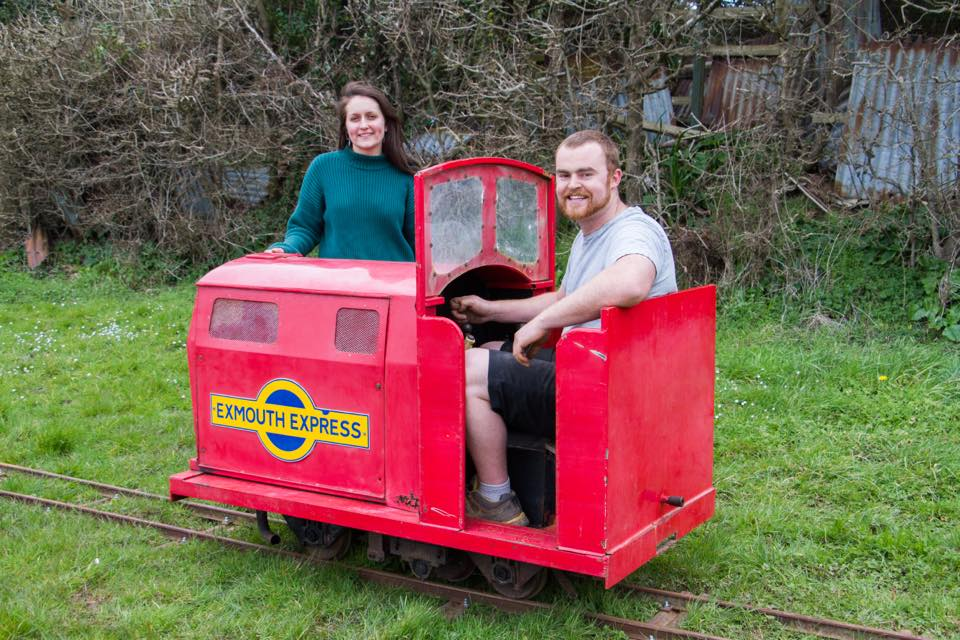
Exmouth Miniature Railway

- Westonzoyland Pumping Station Museum, Somerset

==== Miniature ====
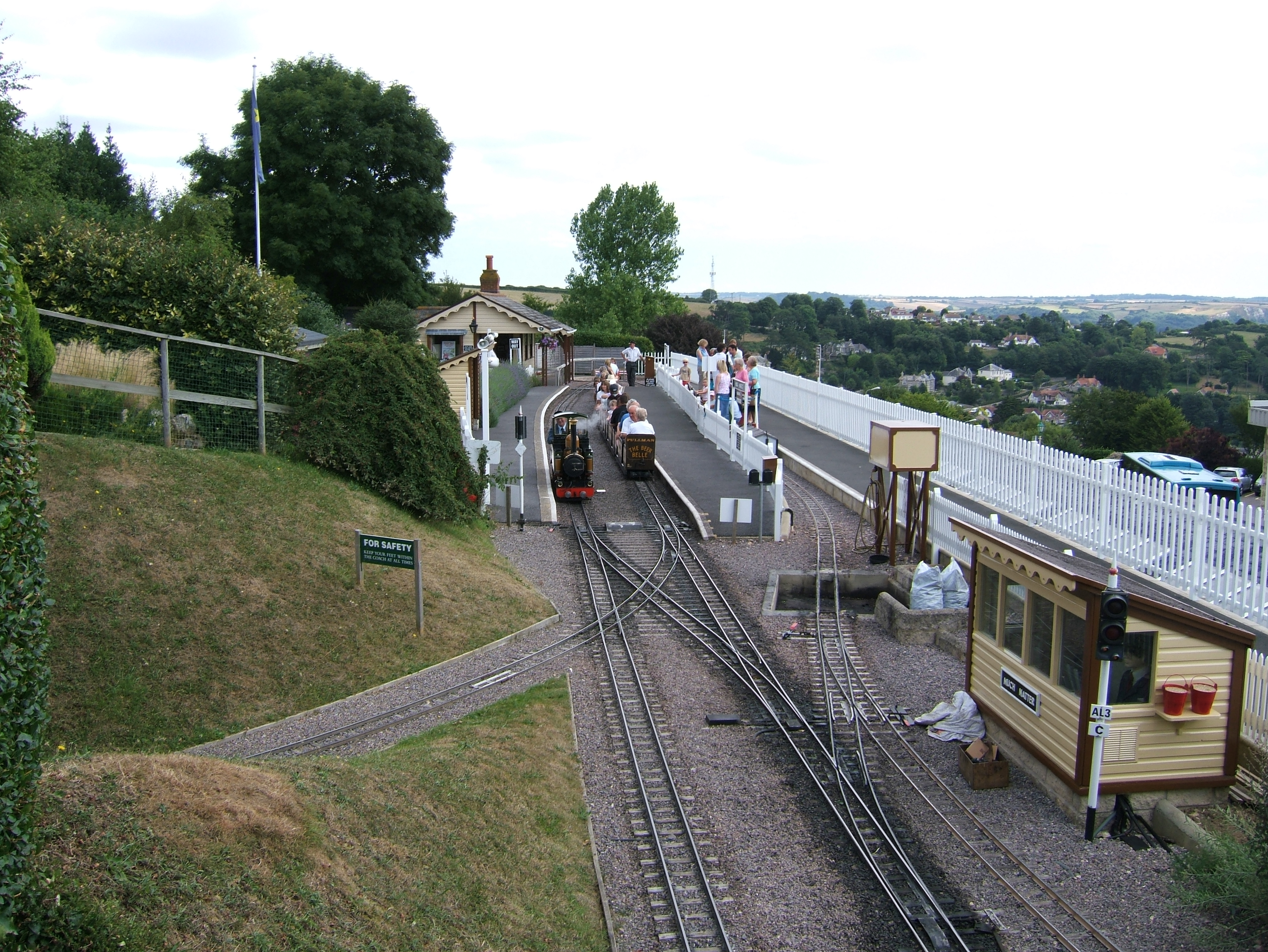
The Beer Heights Light Railway

- Ashton Court Miniature Railway, Bristol
- Beer Heights Light Railway, Devon
- Berkeley Light Railway, Gloucestershire
- Exmouth Miniature Railway, Devon
- Gorse Blossom Farm Railway, Devon
- Lappa Valley Steam Railway, Cornwall
- Longleat Railway, Wiltshire
- Moors Valley Railway, Ashley Heath, Dorset
- Perrygrove Railway, Coleford, Gloucestershire
- Bickington Steam Railway, Trago Mills, Devon

==== Tramways ====
- Seaton Tramway, Seaton, Devon

=== West Midlands ===
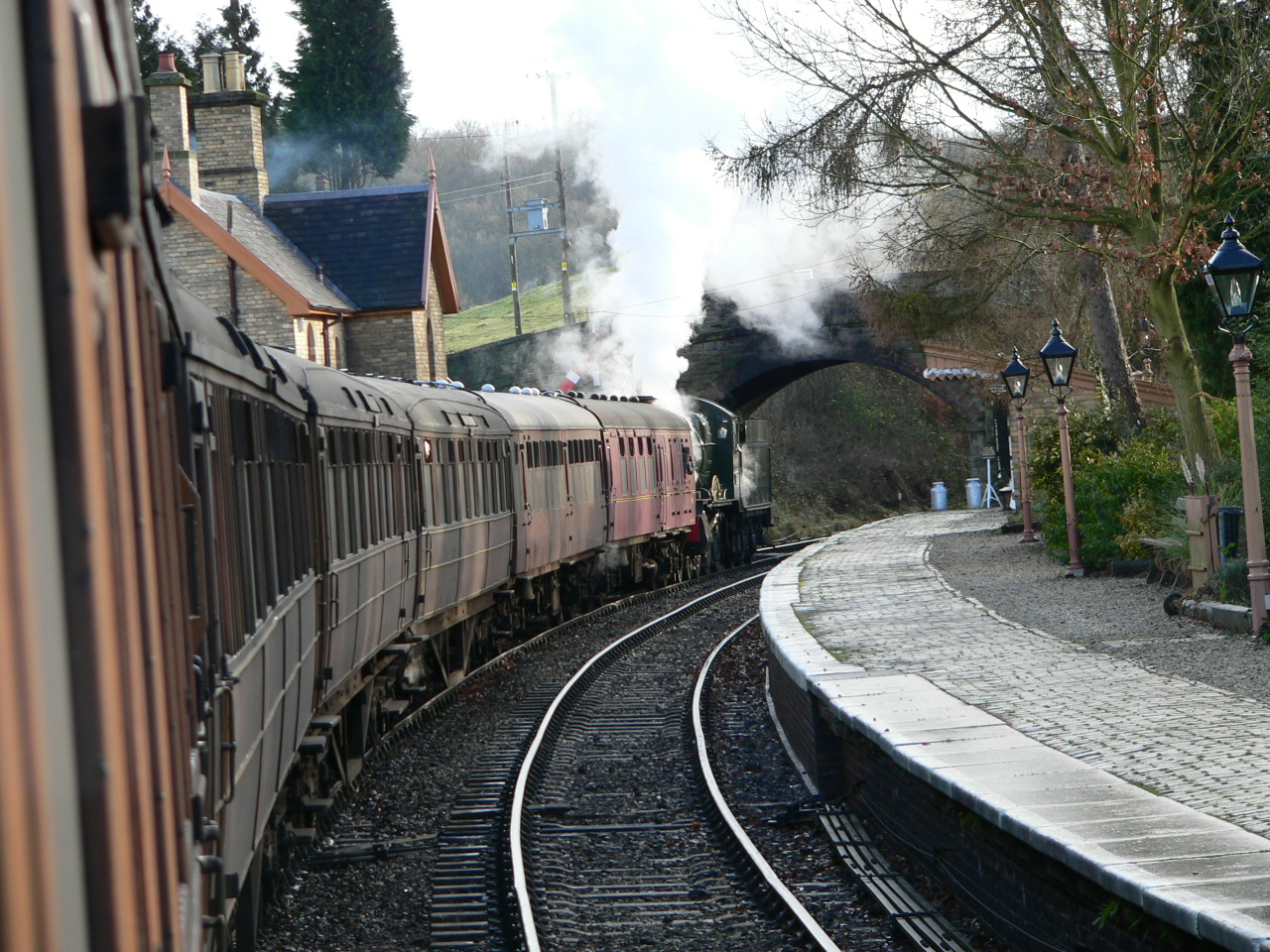
Arley station on the Severn Valley Railway

==== Standard gauge ====
- Cambrian Heritage Railways, Oswestry and Llynclys, Shropshire
- Chasewater Railway, Chasewater Country Park, Brownhills, Staffordshire
- Churnet Valley Railway, Cheddleton, Staffordshire
- Foxfield Railway, Blythe Bridge, Staffordshire
- Gloucestershire Warwickshire Railway, Toddington, Gloucestershire and Broadway, Worcestershire
- Severn Valley Railway, Bridgnorth, Shropshire and Kidderminster, Worcestershire
- Telford Steam Railway, Horsehay, Shropshire

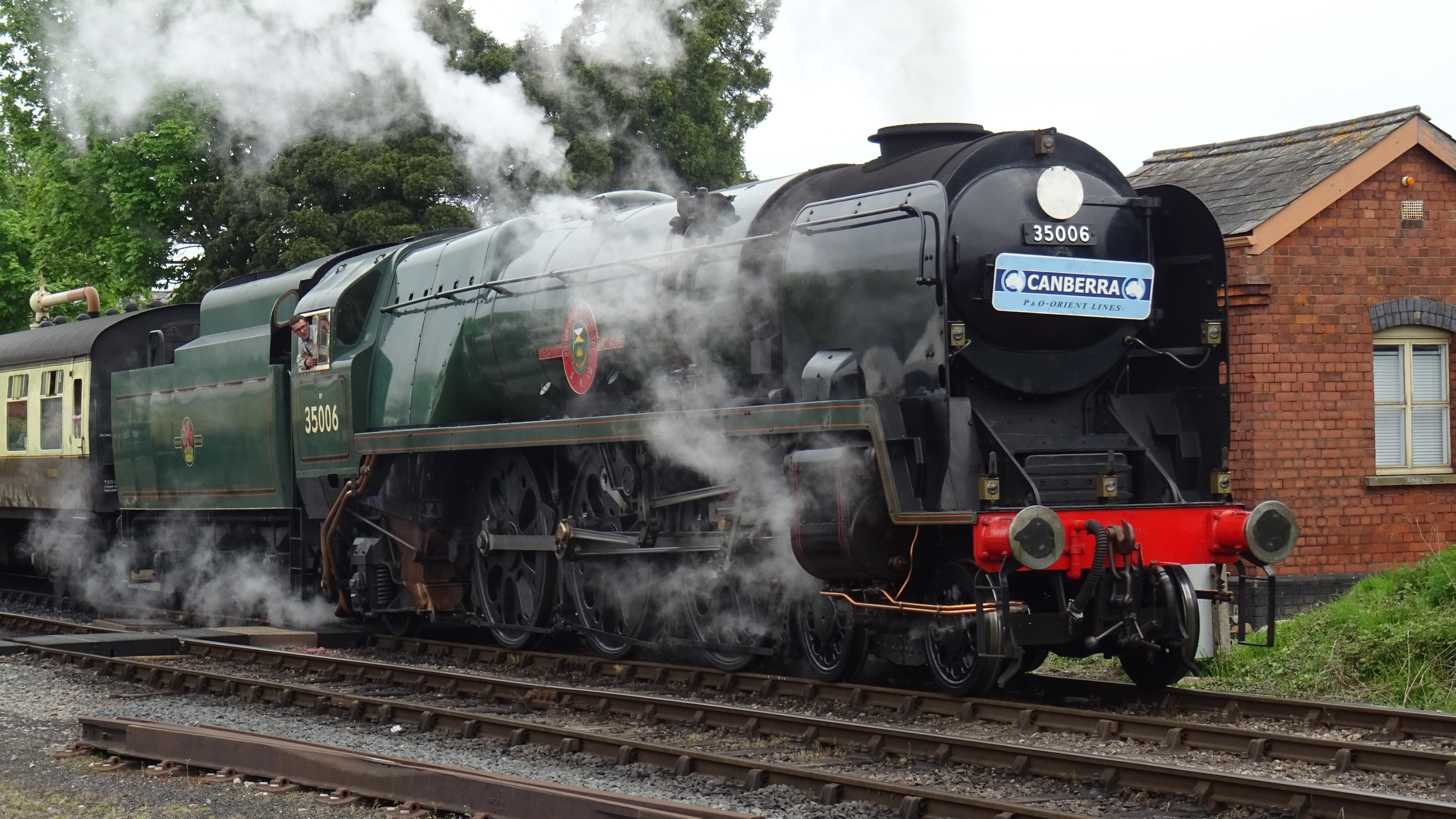
Gloucestershire Warwickshire Railway

==== Railway centres and museums ====
- Coleford Great Western Railway Museum, Coleford, Gloucestershire
- Tyseley Locomotive Works, Birmingham
- Winchcombe Railway Museum, Winchcombe, Gloucestershire

==== Narrow gauge ====
- Amerton Railway, Staffordshire
- Apedale Valley Light Railway, Chesterton, Newcastle Under Lyme, Staffordshire
- Bromyard and Linton Light Railway, Bromyard, Herefordshire – private site
- Lea Bailey Light Railway. Gloucestershire / Herefordshire border
- Moseley Railway Trust, Chesterton, Newcastle-under-Lyme, Staffordshire
- North Gloucestershire Railway, Toddington, Gloucestershire
- Perrygrove Railway, Gloucestershire
- Rudyard Lake Steam Railway, Rudyard, Staffordshire
- Statfold Barn Railway, Tamworth, Staffordshire

==== Miniature ====
- Broomy Hill Railway, Herefordshire
- Downs Light Railway, Colwall, Worcestershire (also the oldest private miniature railway worldwide)
- Echills Wood Railway, Kingsbury Waterpark, Warwickshire
- Rainsbrook Valley Railway, Onley Lane, Warwickshire
- The Valley Railway Adventure, Evesham Country Park, Worcestershire
- Weston Park Railway, Shropshire

==== Tramways ====
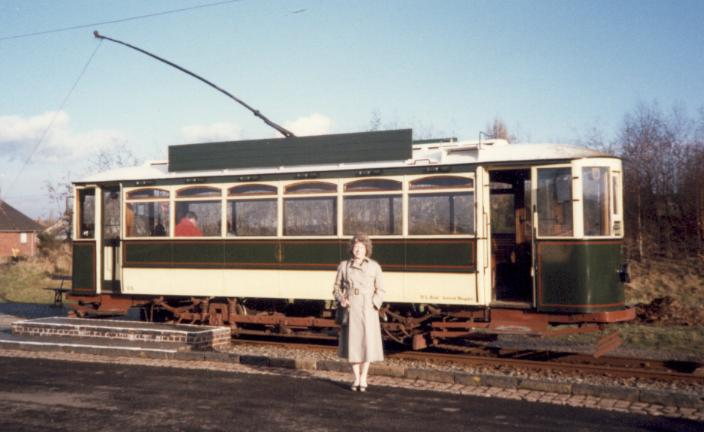
Dudley tram No. 5 of 1920 at Black Country Museum

- Black Country Living Museum, Dudley, West Midlands

=== Proposed ===
==== East of England ====
- Leiston Works Railway, Leiston, Suffolk (currently under construction)
- Norfolk Orbital Railway, Holt, Norfolk
- Southwold Railway, Blythburgh and Southwold, Suffolk
- Wisbech and March Railway, Waldersea, Cambridgeshire

==== North of England ====
- Poulton and Wyre Railway, Thornton–Cleveleys, Lancashire (under restoration)

==== South West England ====
- Vale of Berkeley Railway, Sharpness, Gloucestershire

=== Defunct ===
This is a list of former heritage railway attractions that are now defunct.

- Ashford Steam Centre, Willesborough, Kent – closed in 1976.
- Abbey Light Railway, Kirkstall, West Yorkshire – closed in 2012.
- Bolebroke Castle Miniature Railway, East Sussex – closed 2012
- Brockham Railway Museum, Dorking, Surrey – closed 1982 (Stock moved to Amberley Museum Railway, West Sussex)
- Buxton Steam Centre, Derbyshire – closed in 1987, as Peak Rail moved to Darley Dale.
- Cadeby Light Railway, Cadeby, Leicestershire – closed in 2005.
- Chester Zoo monorail, Chester Zoo, Chester- closed in 2019
- Creekmoor Light Railway, Poole, Dorset – closed in 1973
- Dinting Railway Centre, Derbyshire – closed in 1991; Society moved to Ingrow (West) station on the KWVR, West Yorkshire.
- Dowty Railway Centre, Ashchurch, Gloucestershire – closed in the 1980s
- Eastbourne Tramway, East Sussex – closed 1969 (moved to Seaton, Devon).
- Electric Railway Museum, Warwickshire - closed in October 2017 (rolling stock relocated to other preserved railways across the UK).
- Elsecar Heritage Railway, South Yorkshire - closed 2020.
- Far Tottering and Oyster Creek Branch Railway, Battersea Park, London- closed 1975
- Finmere railway station, Buckinghamshire (stock relocated after the land was developed for HS2).
- Great Yorkshire Railway Preservation Society, Starbeck, North Yorkshire – closed in 1989 (group moved to Murton, near York, to restore part of the former Derwent Valley Light Railway).
- Himley Park, Dudley, South Staffordshire - Closed 1993
- Lincolnshire Coast Light Railway, Humberston, Lincolnshire – closed 1985 - rebuilt 2009 in Skegness.
- Markeaton Park Light Railway, Rowsley, Derbyshire - closed in 2016, track lifted in 2017.
- Marwell Wildlife Railway, Hampshire - closed in 2021 and track lifted by end of 2022.
- Museum of British Transport, Clapham, South London – closed in 1973. Some exhibits moved, first to Syon Park, west London, and subsequently to Covent Garden to form London Transport Museum. Some exhibits moved to NRM York.
- North Downs Steam Railway, Dartford, Kent – closed in 1995 (society merged with Spa Valley Railway)
- North Woolwich Old Station Museum, East London – closed in 2008
- Queen Mary's Hospital Miniature Railway, Carshalton, south London - closed in 1997
- Ramsgate Tunnel Railway, Ramsgate, Kent – closed in 1965
- Snibston Railway, Coalville, Leicestershire – closed on 31 July 2015 (as with the Discovery Museum, itself)
- Southport Pier Tramway, Southport, Merseyside - closed 2015
- Southport Railway Museum, Southport, Lancashire – closed in 1999 (Society moved to Preston Docks as the Ribble Steam Railway).
- Stevington & Turvey Light Railway, Turvey, Bedfordshire – private site - closed in 2014.
- Transperience, Low Moor, Bradford, Yorkshire – closed in 1997
- Wells Harbour Railway, in Norfolk - closed in 2021
- Westerham Valley Railway Association, Westerham, Kent – closed 1965 (merged with Kent and East Sussex Railway Preservation Society with a few items of stock transferred to KWVR).

== Northern Ireland ==
See List of heritage railways in Northern Ireland

=== Irish standard gauge ===
- Downpatrick and County Down Railway, County Down

=== Railway centres and museums ===
- Foyle Valley Railway Museum, County Londonderry
- Whitehead Railway Museum, Whitehead, County Antrim
- Ulster Folk and Transport Museum, Cultra, County Down

=== Narrow gauge ===
- Giant's Causeway and Bushmills Railway, County Antrim
- Peatlands Park Railway, County Armagh

=== Defunct ===
- Shane's Castle Railway, County Antrim – closed 1994 (stock moved to Giants Causeway and Bushmills Railway.)

== Scotland ==
=== Standard gauge ===
==== Borders ====
- Waverley Route Heritage Association, Whitrope, Roxburghshire

==== Central Highlands ====
- Keith & Dufftown Railway, Dufftown, Banffshire and Keith, Morayshire
- Strathspey Railway, Aviemore, Highland

==== East Coast of Scotland ====
- Bo'ness and Kinneil Railway, Bo'ness, Falkirk
- Fife Heritage Railway, Leven, Fife
- Caledonian Railway, Brechin, Angus
- Royal Deeside Railway, Milton of Crathes, Aberdeenshire

==== South West Scotland ====
- Scottish Industrial Railway Centre, Dunaskin - Waterside, East Ayrshire

=== Railway centres and museums ===
- Museum of Scottish Railways, Bo'ness, Falkirk
- Riverside Museum, Glasgow
- Summerlee Museum of Scottish Industrial Life, Coatbridge, North Lanarkshire

=== Narrow gauge ===
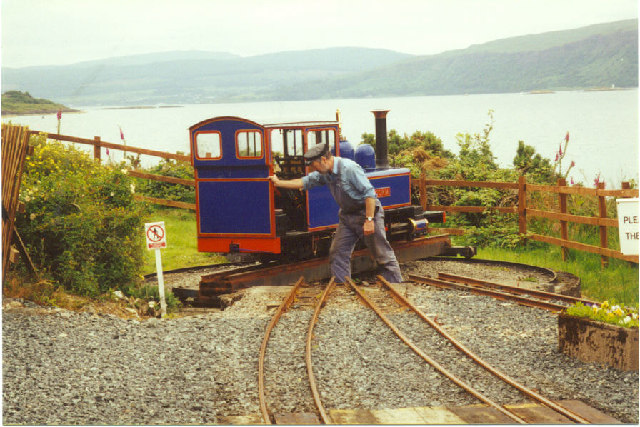
Craignure station on the 260 mm gauge Isle of Mull railway

- Alford Valley Railway, Alford, Aberdeenshire
- Almond Valley Light Railway, Livingston, West Lothian
- Leadhills and Wanlockhead Railway, South Lanarkshire

=== Miniature railways ===
- Craigtoun Miniature Railway, St Andrews, Fife
- Ness Islands Railway, Inverness
- Barshaw Park Railway, Renfrewshire

=== Defunct ===
- Isle of Mull Railway, Inner Hebrides – closed in 2011.
- Kerr's Miniature Railway, Arbroath - closed in 2020.
- Lochty Private Railway, Fife – closed in 1992.
- Sanday Light Railway, Braeswick, Orkney – closed in 2006.

== Wales ==
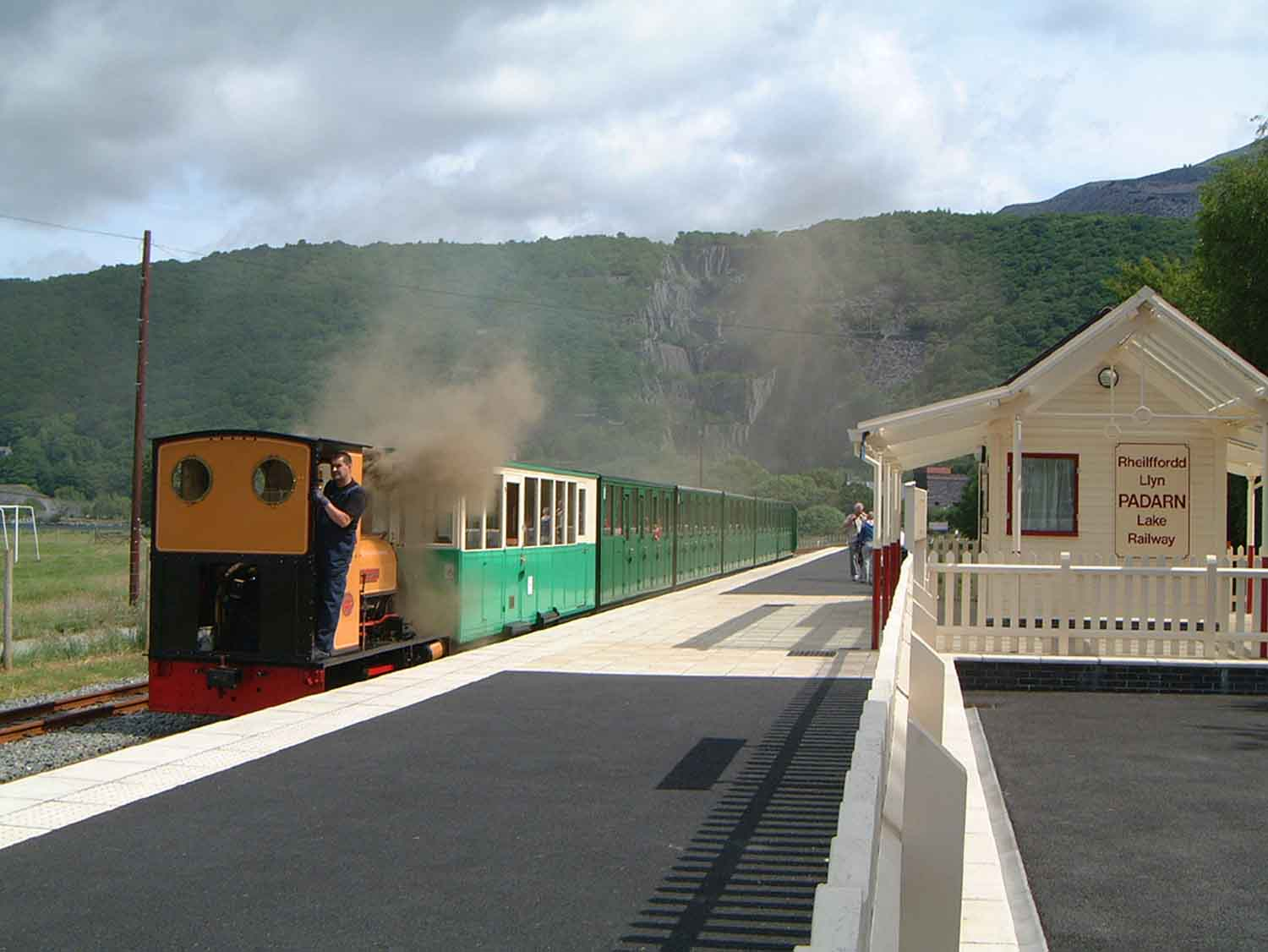
The Llanberis Lake Railway

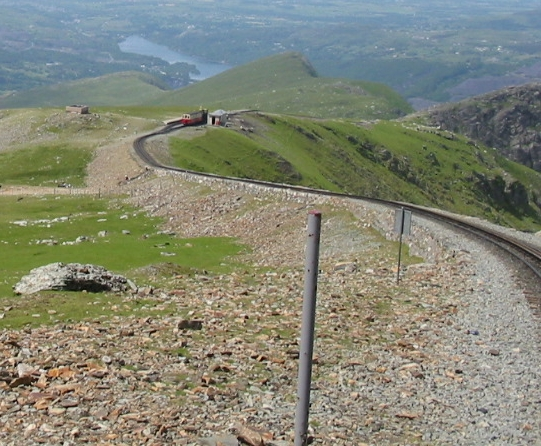
The Snowdon Mountain Railway

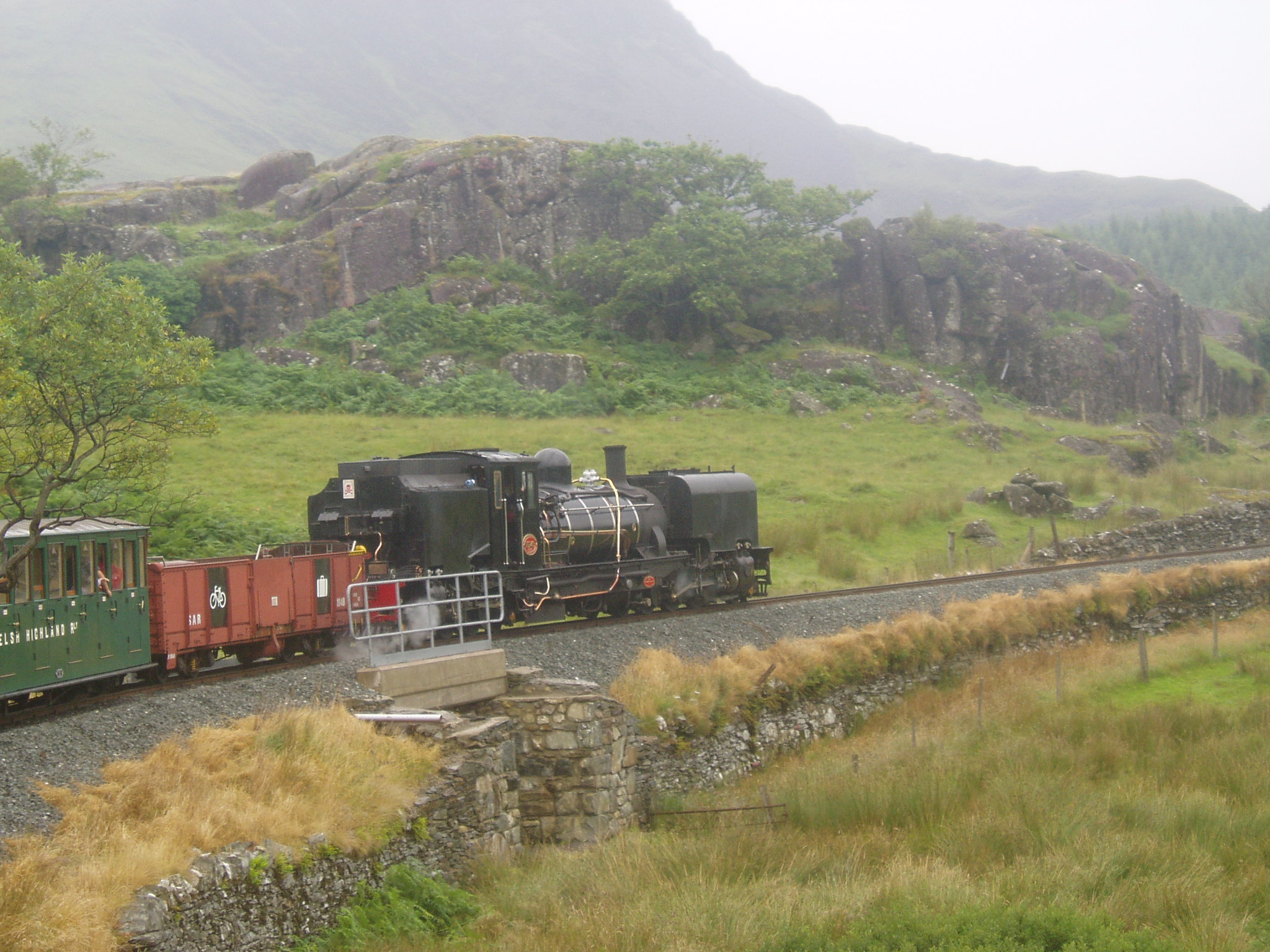
The Welsh Highland Railway

=== North Wales ===
Name	Type	Gauge	Length	Opened	Closed	Re-Opened	Notes
Llangollen Railway	Heritage railway	4 ft 8 1/2 in (1,435 mm)	16 km	1862	1964	1981	
Conwy Valley Railway Museum	Museum and miniature railway	7 1/4 in (184 mm)	1.6 km	1970s			Has a 0.8 km long 15 in (381 mm) gauge tramway
Bala Lake Railway	Heritage railway	1 ft 11 5/8 in (600 mm)	7.2 km	1861	1965	1972	Originally standard gauge line
Ffestiniog Railway	Heritage railway	1 ft 11 1/2 in (597 mm)	21.7 km	1836	1946	1954	Also owns and operates the Welsh Highland Railway
Llanberis Lake Railway	Heritage railway	1 ft 11 1/2 in (597 mm)	4 km	1971			
Snowdon Mountain Railway	Tourist railway	2 ft 7 1/2 in (800 mm)	7.5 km	1896			
Welsh Highland Heritage Railway	Heritage railway	1 ft 11 1/2 in (597 mm)	1.6 km	1980			
Welsh Highland Railway	Heritage railway	1 ft 11 1/2 in (597 mm)	40.2 km	1922	1937	1997	Owned and operated by the Ffestiniog Railway
Fairbourne Railway	Miniature railway	12 1/4 in (311 mm)	3.2 km	1895	1940	1947	Previously 2 ft (610 mm) and 15 in (381 mm)
Rhyl Miniature Railway	Miniature railway	15 in (381 mm)	1.6 km	1911			
West Shore Miniature Railway	Miniature railway			2018			
Great Orme Tramway	Tramway	3 ft 6 in (1,067 mm)		1902			
Glyn Valley Tramway	Tramway	2 ft 4 1/2 in (724 mm)	0 km	1873	1935		under restoration

=== Mid Wales ===
Name	Type	Gauge	Length	Opened	Closed	Re-Opened	Notes
Corris Railway	Heritage railway	2 ft 3 in (686 mm)	1.17 km	1859	1948	1971	
Talyllyn Railway	Heritage railway	2 ft 3 in (686 mm)	11.67 km	1865			Includes Narrow Gauge Railway Museum
Welshpool and Llanfair Light Railway	Heritage railway	2 ft 6 in (762 mm)	13.7 km	1903	1956	1963	
Vale of Rheidol Railway	Heritage railway	1 ft 11 3/4 in (603 mm)	18.91 km	1902			
Rhiw Valley Light Railway	Miniature railway	15 in (381 mm)	1.265 km	1970	2022		

=== South Wales ===
Name	Type	Gauge	Length	Opened	Closed	Re-Opened	Notes
Gwili Railway	Heritage railway	4 ft 8 1/2 in (1,435 mm)	7.24 km	1860	1973	1978	
Llanelli and Mynydd Mawr Railway	Heritage railway	4 ft 8 1/2 in (1,435 mm)	0.4 km	1802	1989	2017	
Pontypool and Blaenavon Railway	Heritage railway	4 ft 8 1/2 in (1,435 mm)	5.6 km	1866	1941	1983	
Brecon Mountain Railway	Tourist Railway	1 ft 11 3/4 in (603 mm)	8 km	1980			
Margam Park Railway		1 ft 11 3/4 in (603 mm)		c. 2011			
Teifi Valley Railway		2 ft (610 mm)	1 km			1986	Closed 2014 and much of the track lifted. Reopened 2016
Cefn Mably Farm Park Railway Attraction	Miniature railway	12 1/4 in (311 mm)		c. 2020			
Heath Park Electric Tramway		18 in (457 mm)	0.2 km				

=== Proposed ===
==== North Wales ====
===== Standard gauge =====
- Dolgarrog Railway, Conwy (under construction)

===== Narrow gauge =====
- Glyn Valley Tramway, Chirk, Wrexham (under construction)

==== South Wales ====
===== Standard gauge =====
- Amman Valley Railway, Swansea, West Glamorgan
- Garw Valley Railway, Pontycymer, Bridgend
- Gwendraeth Valley Railway, Kidwelly, Carmarthenshire
- Maerdy Heritage Railway, Maerdy, Rhondda Cynon Taf

=== Defunct ===
- Bala and Ffestiniog Railway#Heritage railway preservation attempts, Company closed in 2023
- Barry Tourist Railway, Vale of Glamorgan - closed 2022, site sold to Transport for Wales.
- Butetown Historical Railway Society, Cardiff Bay – closed in 1997, moved to Barry Tourist Railway
- Caerphilly Railway Society, Caerphilly Railway Works – closed 1996, moved to Gwili Railway
- Gloddfa Ganol, Blaenau Ffestiniog - museum of narrow-gauge railways, closed in 1998, stock sold at auction
- Swansea Vale Railway, Pentrechwyth – closed in 2009, (most of the track and rolling stock are now located on the Gwili Railway).
- Penrhyn Castle Railway Museum, Bangor - closed 2024.
- Penrhyn Quarry Railway, Bethesda, Gwynedd - closed 2017.

== Crown dependencies ==
=== Isle of Man ===
Name	Type	Gauge	Length	Opened	Closed	Re-Opened	Notes
Douglas Bay Horse Tramway	Tramway	3 ft (914 mm)	2.6 km	1876	1939	1946	
Great Laxey Mine Railway	Heritage railway	19 in (483 mm)	0.4 km	1870s	1929	2004	
Groudle Glen Railway	Heritage railway	2 ft (610 mm)	0.9 km	1896	1962	1982	
Isle of Man Railway	Nationalised railway	3 ft (914 mm)	25 km	1874			Current line opened in 1874, however the company's first, now defunct line opened in 1873.
Manx Electric Railway	Nationalised railway	3 ft (914 mm)	27 km	1893			
Snaefell Mountain Railway	Nationalised railway	3 ft 6 in (1,067 mm)	8.9 km	1895			
Crogga Valley Railway	Miniature railway	7 1/4 in (184 mm)	0.41 km				
Orchid Line	Miniature railway	Multiple gauges					

==== Derelict ====
- Queen's Pier Tramway, Ramsey
- Second Falcon Cliff lift, Douglas

See Rail transport in the Isle of Man.

=== Channel Islands ===
- Alderney Railway, Alderney
- Pallot Heritage Steam Museum, Jersey (not in operation)

== British Overseas Territories ==
=== Falkland Islands ===
- Camber Railway, Stanley (defunct)

== See also ==
- British narrow-gauge railways
- British Rail
- Conservation in the United Kingdom
- List of closed railway lines in Great Britain
- List of Conservation topics
- List of funicular railways
- List of heritage railways
- List of heritage railways in the Republic of Ireland
- List of railway companies
- List of Yorkshire railways
- Mainline steam trains in Great Britain
- Mountain railway
- Rail transport in the United Kingdom
- Railways in Norfolk
- Railways of Shropshire
- Ridable miniature railway
