= Markeaton Park Light Railway =

Railway line in Derby, England

MPLR
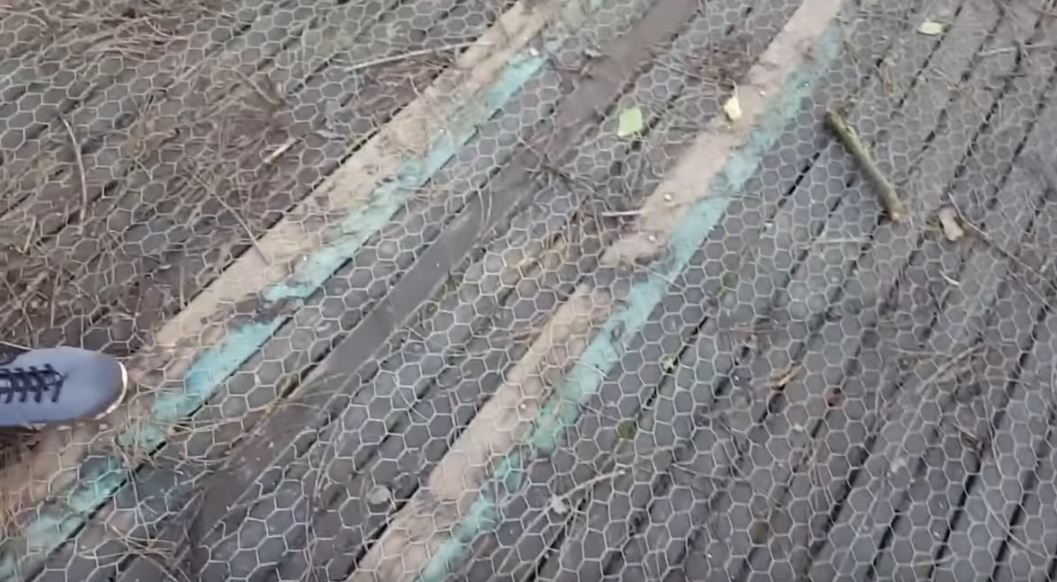
- The railway after closure
- Locale: Markeaton Park, Derbyshire
- Terminus: Markeaton Station
- Coordinates: 52.931219°N 1.504263°W
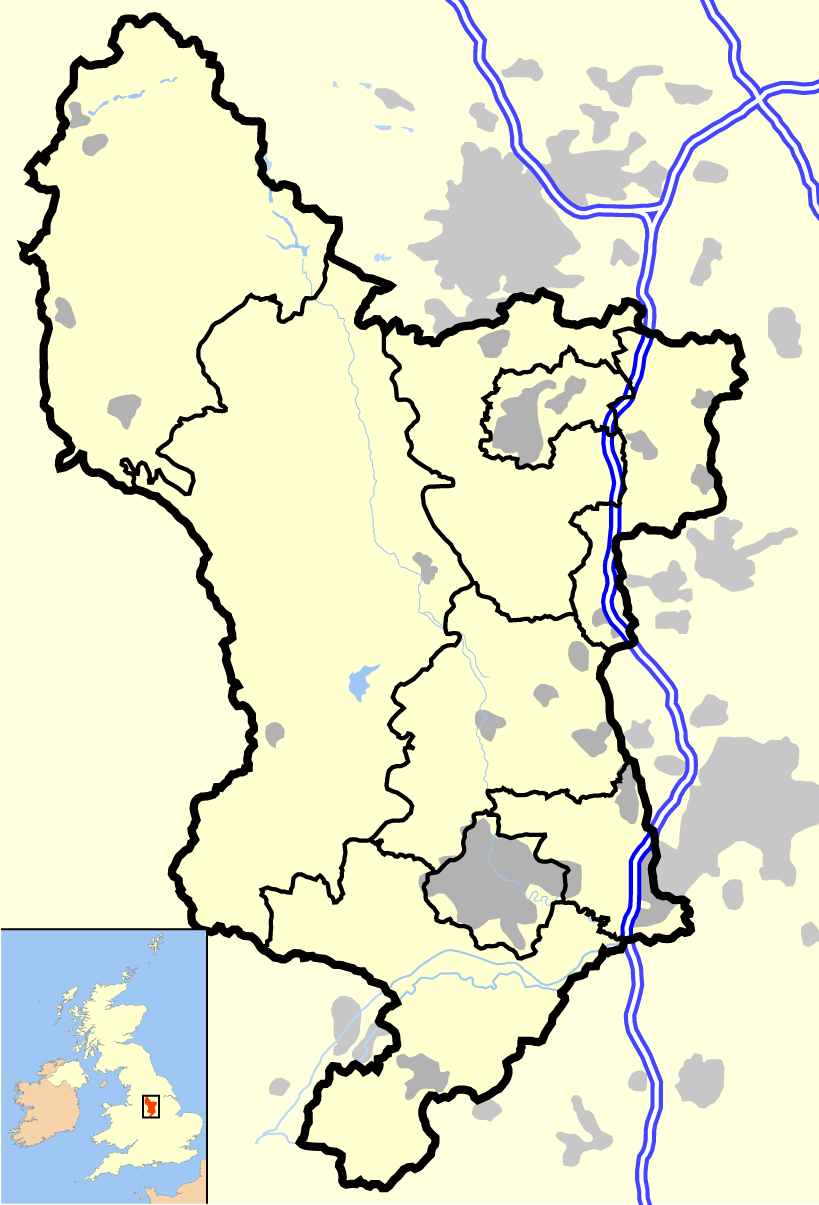
- Connections: None

Commercial operations
- Name: Markeaton Park Light Railway
- Built by: Mr and Mrs Louis Searle
- Original gauge: 15 in (381 mm)

Preserved operations
- Operated by: John Bull and John Bull (father and son)
- Stations: Two
- Length: 1.4 kilometres (0.87 mi)

Commercial history
- Opened: 1989
- Closed: September 2016

The Markeaton Park Light Railway was a 15 in (381 mm) gauge light railway line located within Markeaton Park in the city of Derby, Derbyshire, England. The railway was first opened in 1989, extended in 1996, and closed down in September 2016.

== Description ==
The line was 1.4 kilometres (0.87 mi) long. The railway was privately owned and staffed and maintained by volunteers. The main station, Markeaton Station, was located at the Ashbourne Road/Queensway entrance to the park, next to the car park, in buildings formerly occupied by the British Army. On operating days, trains ran every 25 minutes to Mundy Halt at the Mundy Play Centre. Trains ran at about 7 mph (11 km/h).

== History ==
From 1989 until 1996, when the railway was purchased by John Bull, the motive power was a 4-wheeled petrol-hydraulic locomotive named "Invicta". The carriages were two open "toastrack" vehicles, largely built by the original owner. From 1996 until the summer of 2009 the railway operated a steam locomotive "Markeaton Lady" which was built by the Exmoor Steam Railway in 1996. She was a 0-4-2T and was purchased and operated by John Bull, the final owner of the Markeaton Park railway. It was sold in 2009 due as her boiler needed replacement and the owner could not afford to undertake the work. The locomotive now operates at Evesham Vale Light Railway, where it carries the name "Monty".

In 2002, the line purchased with a replica British Rail Baby Deltic diesel locomotive from the 15 in (381 mm) gauge Cleethorpes Coast Light Railway. After an overhaul the locomotive started operating on the line in 2003. The locomotive had been supplied new to the Steamtown miniature railway at Carnforth before moving to Cleethorpes. The line used three coaches built by Exmoor, and three ex-Fairbourne coaches which were modified and re-gauged.

An industrial style diesel locomotive originally built by Ruston and Hornsby and rebuilt by Alan Keef which had run at Markeaton before, named "Cromwell", was anticipated to join the railway again in 2010, but this did not take place.

During 2010 the railway was put up for sale, but this was retracted during the 2010 winter period.

Markeaton Park Light Railway operated for the last time on Sunday 18 September 2016. Major maintenance work was required to repair the engine shed and depot, which had been the responsibility of Derby City Council. The council were unable to fund the required repairs. The track was subsequently removed, with the exception of some concrete level crossings. The locomotive and carriages were sold to the Lappa Valley Steam Railway after closure.
