= Rudyard Lake Steam Railway =

Miniature heritage railway in England

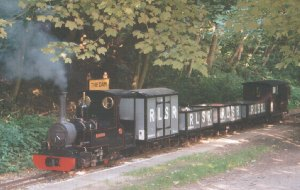
- Excalibur at Rudyard Lake Steam Railway
- Locale: Staffordshire, England
- Coordinates: 53.1348°N 2.0821°W

Preserved operations
- Length: 1 1/2 miles (2.4 km)
- Preserved gauge: 10 1/4 in (260 mm)

Commercial history
- Opened: 1985

Preservation history
- Headquarters: Rudyard, Staffordshire

Website
- https://rlsr.org/

The Rudyard Lake Steam Railway is a ridable miniature railway and the third railway of any gauge to run along the side of Rudyard Lake in Staffordshire, England.

== Overview ==
The railway runs for 1 1/2 miles (2.4 km) on the track bed of an old standard gauge North Staffordshire Railway line. After the NSR line closed down, a small narrow gauge railway was laid on the site in the 1970s; it ran for two years before moving via Suffolk to Trago Mills in Devon. The current line started in 1985 and is 10 1/4 in (260 mm) gauge, and operates to a timetable. It was built by Peter Hanton of Congleton between 1985 and 1993. In October 2000, he sold the railway to Rudyard Lake Steam Railway Ltd, who have developed it since that date.

The railway was purchased by the Leek and Rudyard Railway on 18 December 2015. This company owned the assets of the former Isle of Mull Railway and combined the two railways at Rudyard. In May 2024 the railway changed hands again and is now owned and operated by the Rudyard Lake Railway.

Trains run at weekends and bank holidays from March to November, with more regular services from Easter to October and daily during school holidays..The railway is a member of Britain's Great Little Railways.

== Route ==
The railway runs for 1 1/2 miles (2.4 km) on the track bed of an old standard gauge North Staffordshire Railway line. It operates from Rudyard railway station to the dam, then along the side of the lake to terminate at Hunthouse Wood, about a mile south of the site of the old Cliffe Park railway station. There is also a passing loop at Lakeside Loop

== Locomotives ==
Many of the locomotives were named by the former owner's wife after the legends of King Arthur:

Image	No.	Name	Wheel arrangement	Builder	Date built	Notes
Steam Locomotives
	6	Excalibur	2-4-2T	Exmoor Steam Railway	1993	Previously named River Churnet prior to rebuild in 2003, when regauged from 12 1/4 inch gauge.
	8	King Arthur	0-6-2T	Exmoor Steam Railway	2005	Overhauled 2019
	9	Pendragon	2-4-2T	Exmoor Steam Railway	1998	Built alongside Merlin, Previously known as Ashorne and ran on the 12.25" Ashorne Hall Railway. One of the most well travelled steam engines in the world, having lived at Ashorne, Rudyard, Leaving in 2019, Royal Victoria Railway, Ferry Medows Miniature Railway, Astbury Light Railway, and returning to Rudyard in 2024. She has Also visited a number of other railways including Fairbourne Railway, Wells and Walsingham Light Railway, Hastings Miniature Railway and many others. It is also notably the first ever steam engine to go through a McDonald's Drive-through
	196	Waverley	4-4-2	David Curwen	1948	On permanent loan; formerly at the Isle of Mull Railway.
		Victoria	2-6-2T	Mouse Boiler Works	1993	Based on the Victorian Railways NA class, Victoria is privately owned. Removed for overhaul in Sheffield from December 2015 to December 2018.
	4	Norfolk Pioneer	2-6-0	Tony Martin at Wells and Walsingham Light Railway	2011	Arrived at Rudyard in 2024, from the Astbury Light Railway. Built for the Wells and Walsingham Light Railway
		George	0-4-2T	Exmoor Steam Railway		Built for Poole Park Railway, also lived at Honey Brook Farm. Sister engine to Peggy and Pulborough at South Downs Light Railway
Internal Combustion Locomotives
	2	Ferret	4wPM	Terry Stanhope of Leeds	1969	Re-gauged from 2' to 15" then 10.25" gauge, briefly known as Mordred in line with the Knights of the Round Table theme.
	5	Rudyard Lady	Bo-Bo	L.A.Smith of Leek	1989	Bogie diesel, privately owned. Built for the railway in 1989 by L A Smith of Leek and since being built, has never left the railway except for a short stay in a storage facility in Leek in 2018 while the railway constructed a new engine shed. In 2025, she received a full mechanical rebuild/repaint into her original livery, including an extensive overhaul of her original engine and gearbox which was completed just in time for the railway's 40th anniversary gala in August
		Frances	Bo-Bo	Mouse Boiler Works	1999	Bogie diesel, formerly at Isle of Mull Railway.
		Ulysses	Bo-Bo	Shilingstone Light Railway		Large diesel built for the Shillingstone Light Railway
		Paignton Zoo 37	Bo-Bo	Bickington Steam Railway (Trago Mills)		In the process of being converted from battery electric to diesel, Briefly lived at the Astbury Light Railway
		Elizabeth	0-4-2T	Exmoor Steam Railway	2012	Steam outline, Built for Poole Park Railway, also lived at Honey Brook Farm
		Arun	0-4-2DH	Exmoor Steam Railway	2015	Built for the South Downs Light Railway where it ran for many years, now running at Rudyard via a brief stint on loan to Hastings Miniature Railway. Arun is privately owned
Non-Passenger Hauling Engines						
		Ikanhopit	0-4-0			Worlds Smallest 10.25" engine, lived at the Astbury Light Railway. Built for the Queen Mary's Hospital Railway in Essex
		The Wasp	0-4-0	Sir Thomas Salt		One of the fastest engine of the gauge, having been built to do 40mph! although now significantly geared down. Built for the Shillingstone Light Railway
	69	Scamp 69, "Vanelope"	0-4-0	Adam Jeffrey, to the Design of Colin Edmondson		One of the Popular Scamp designs, can have its gauge changed between 7 1/4 and 10 1/4 in under an hour through having 2 pairs of wheelsets
Locomotives that have since left the railway						
	7	Merlin	2-4-2T	Exmoor Steam Railway	1998	Overhauled 2020, now at a private railway.
		Lady Jane Grey	0-4-0T + T	Bressingham Steam Museum & Gardens		Returned to the private Somerford Light Railway
		Gladstone	4-4-2	Rebuilt by H Bullock in 1937	~1890	The worlds first 10.25" engine, and RLR's first steam engine too, returning in 2025 for the 40th Anniversary, original engines gala.
		Belle	0-4-0	David Curwen	1954	Built for the Shillingstone Light Railway.
		Glen Auldyn	Bo-Bo	Bob Davies	1988	Bogie diesel, formerly at Isle of Mull Railway.

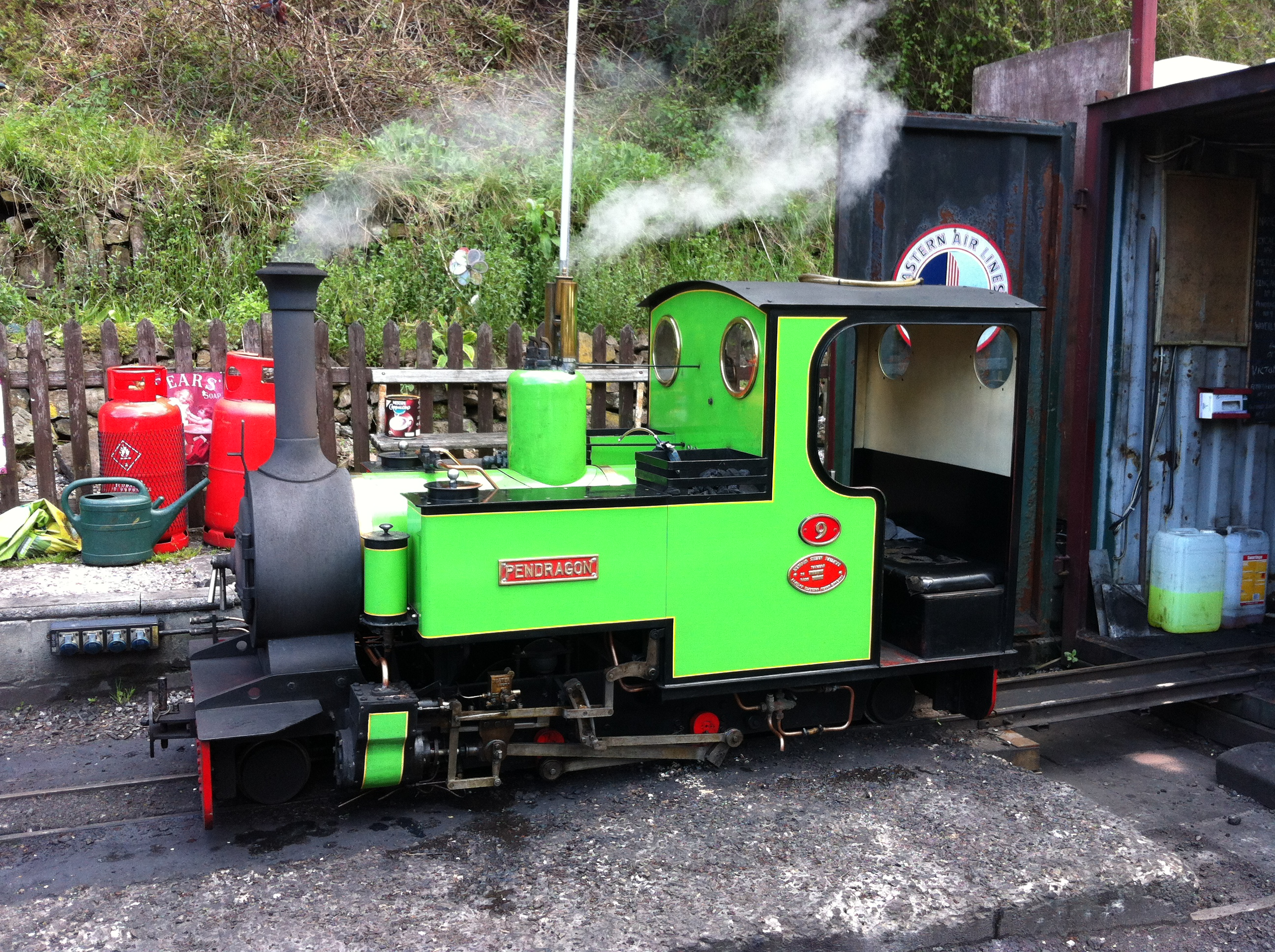
No. 9 Pendragon

A fleet of 13 carriages and a wide variety of goods wagons are also used. A further enclosed brake carriage was constructed in 2011 and brought into service in August; another 12 seat enclosed coach was added in December 2012. The carriages from the closed Isle of Mull Railway are also slowly being brought back into service after restoration.

== Facilities ==
"Merlin" coupling up at Rudyard station in 2013

Rudyard Station comprises Platform 1 with a shelter where the trains depart. A footbridge links this to Platform 2 where the cafe, a large covered picnic area, signal box and toilets are located. Platform 2 is, in fact, the original standard gauge platform built by the North Staffordshire Railway. The original flower beds and retaining walls are clearly visible. At a higher level than platform 1 is a good vantage point. To the South end of the station are the engine shed, water tower, coal bunker, storage shed and workshop.

The railway offers learn to drive a steam train courses, of either a half or full day for individuals or groups. Children's parties are hosted and the Platform 2 Cafe provides cold refreshments all year around whenever the railway is running.

== Sources ==
- Hanton, Peter. The Heywood Society Journal No. 34, Spring 1994
- Williams John K. The Heywood Society Journal No. 52, Spring 2003
- Hanson, Michael. The Heywood Society Journal No. 56, Spring 2005
