= Ashorne Hall Railway =

Ridable miniature railway in Warwickshire, England

Coordinates: 52.2245°N 1.5419°W

Overview
- Locale: England
- Dates of operation: circa 1995–2003

Technical
- Track gauge: 12 1/4 in (311 mm)
- Length: 1 mi (1.6 km)

The Ashorne Hall Railway was a ridable miniature railway in the grounds of Ashorne Hill House, Warwickshire, England. It was conceived as an added attraction to the collection of mechanical musical instruments at the Ashorne Hall museum. It was completed in the mid-1990s and called the Nickelodeon Line.

It was 12 1/4 in (311 mm) gauge and had a complicated track layout giving a journey of about 1 mi (1.6 km) in a restricted area of 6 acres (24,000 m^{2}). With two substantial stations, a tunnel and engine shed it was very well equipped. With the death of its creator Graham Whitehead in 2003, the railway closed. It was dismantled and sold in 2005 and the track lifted. The steam locomotive is now at the Rudyard Lake Steam Railway and the petrol locomotive and carriages at the Wilderness Railway.

== Equipment ==
Locomotives

- 2-4-2T Ashorne, built 1994 by Exmoor Steam Railway
- 2-4-2 Bella, built locally on chassis supplied by Exmoor Steam Railway using a Coventry Climax petrol engine.

Rolling stock

- 5 bogie carriages built locally by Paul Camps on frames supplied by Exmoor Steam Railway
- 2 tip wagons
