= Exmoor Steam Railway =

Narrow-gauge railway in Devon, England

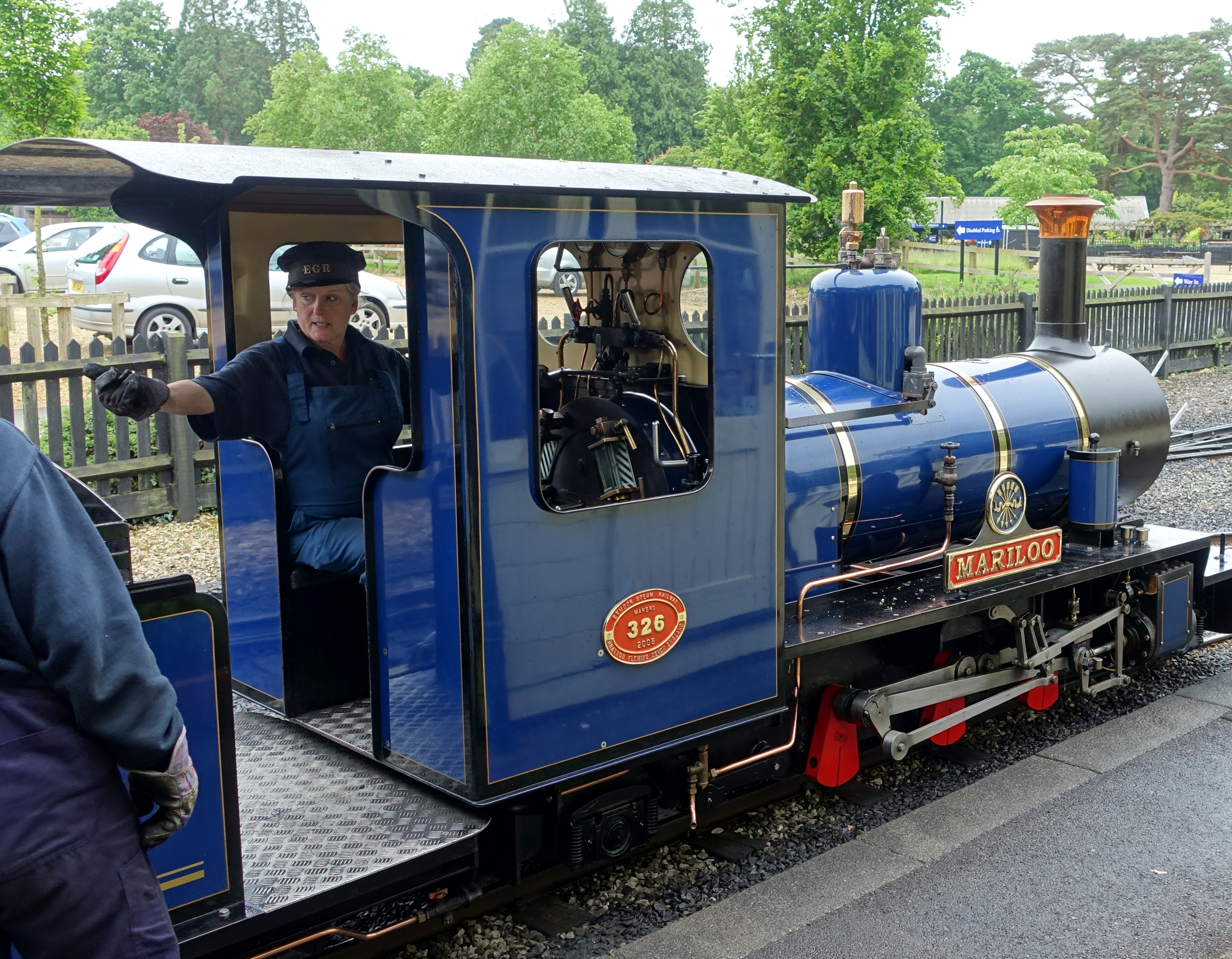
Locomotive Mariloo in Exbury Gardens

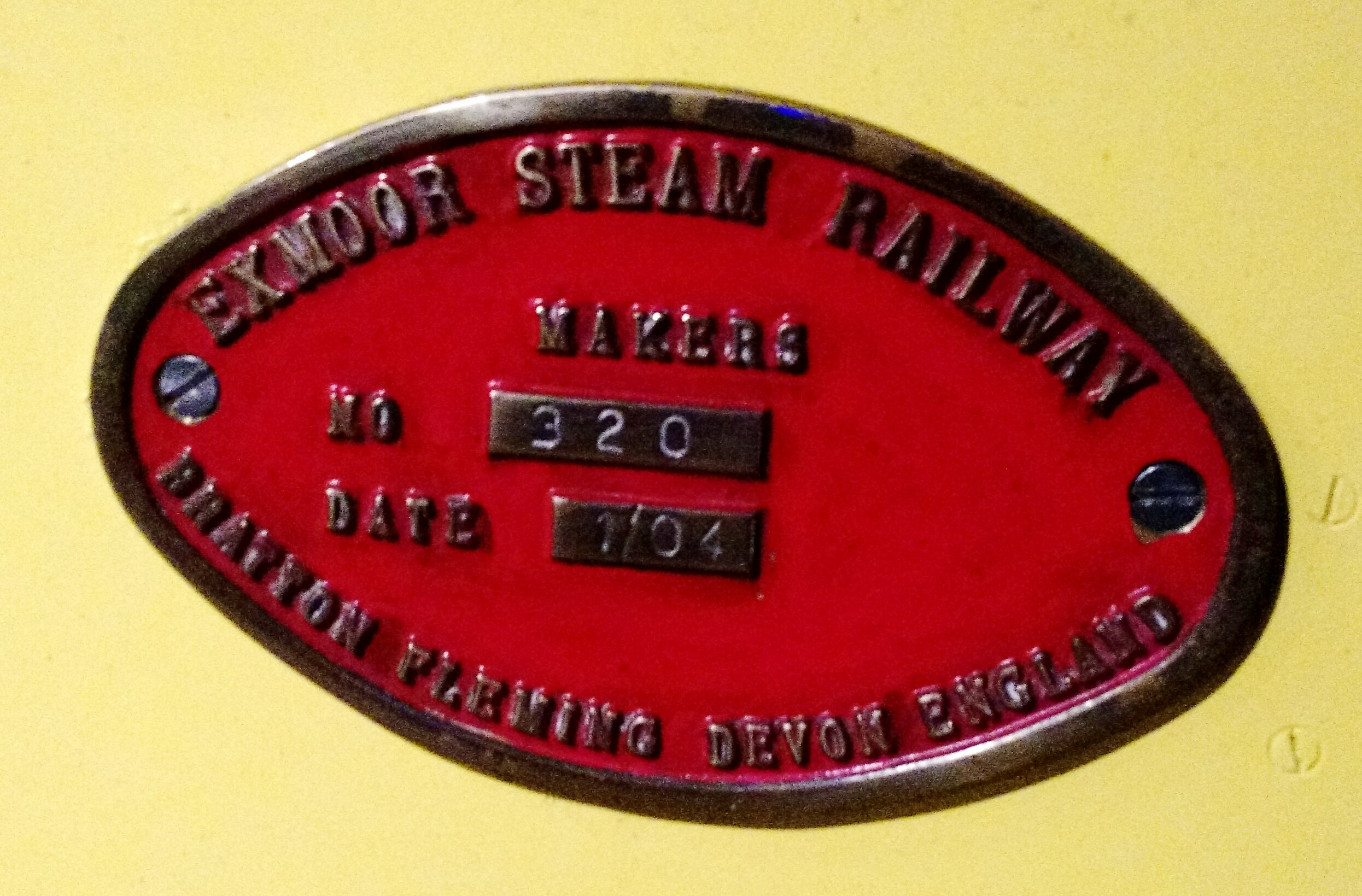
Exmoor Steam Railway Builder's Plate

The Exmoor Steam Railway is a narrow gauge steam railway and locomotive manufacturer, located at Bratton Fleming in North Devon.

== 12 1/4 in (311 mm) gauge ==
The railway was built by the Stirland family and first opened as a tourist attraction in August 1990. At this time the railway ran in a circuit from the main station at Exmoor Central, trains descending on a large embankment before climbing back up through a spiral tunnel. In 1996 a new station was opened at Cape of Good Hope, which changed the line to an "end-to-end" layout. At the end of the 2001 season, the decision was taken to close the railway to the public and concentrate on building new steam locomotives and associated equipment. The railway remains in full working order, and work started in the winter 2008/9 on extending the railway. By mid-2010 an additional 1/2 mile (0.80 km) of track had been brought into use, with a very steep ascending and descending ruling gradient of 1 in 28.

== 1 ft 11 1/2 in (597 mm) gauge ==
During the 1990s, a number of 1 ft 11 1/2 in (597 mm) gauge Beyer Garratt articulated locomotives from South Africa arrived on site and were displayed. One locomotive was sold to the Welsh Highland Railway in 2006, whilst another has been under long-term restoration. Over the winter 2008/9 work started on constructing around 1/2 mile (0.80 km) of 1 ft 11 1/2 in gauge railway to run the Garratts on.

=== Locomotives ===
Name	Builder	Type	Number	Built	Notes
	Anglo Franco Belge	2-8-2	2685	1955	S.A.R. NG15
	Beyer Peacock	2-6-2+2-6-2T	115	1939	S.A.R. NGG16
	Hanomag	2-6-2+2-6-2T	77	1928	S.A.R. NGG13, repainted in Dark Blue livery 2010
Eddy	Hunslet	4wDH	9336	1946	Now at Exbury Gardens after re-gauging to 12 1/4 in (311 mm)
	Motor Rail	4wDM	8856	1944	

== Engineering works ==
Since the railway opened, there has been a large workshop on site, which was used to build all the locomotives and equipment used on the railway. In 2001, the decision was taken to close the railway as a tourist attraction and concentrate on the manufacture of miniature and narrow gauge railway equipment.

Exmoor Steam Railway builds several new steam locomotives a year, as well as rolling stock and also advise on the setup and expansion of miniature and narrow gauge railways. Exmoor is a member of Britain's Great Little Railways and has supplied locomotives to many other members who operate public miniature and narrow gauge railways.

== Locomotives constructed ==
Identity	Works number	Type	Gauge	Year built	Operator	Status	Notes	Image
Tryfan	189	2-4-2T	7 1/4 in (184 mm)		private Wilderness Railway		Originally named Bray Valley and original loco of Exmoor Steam Railway	
Yeo Valley	190	2-8-0T	12 1/4 in (311 mm)	1990	Exbury Gardens	Withdrawn from service and dismantled		
Christopher	191	2-6-2T	12 1/4 in (311 mm)regauged from 10 1/4 in (260 mm)	1991	Littlehampton Miniature Railway		Originally John-Remy and a 0-6-2T. Name, wheel arrangement and gauge changed when moved from Beale Park to Littlehampton	
Excalibur	293	2-4-2T	10 1/4 in (260 mm) regauged from 12 1/4 in (311 mm)	1993	Leek and Rudyard Railway		Formerly River Churnet	
Exmoor	294	2-4-2T	12 1/4 in (311 mm)	1993	Exmoor Steam Railway			
Spirit of Adventure	295	0-6-0T	15 in (381 mm)	1993	Perrygrove Railway			
7 Merlin	296	2-4-2T	10 1/4 in (260 mm)	1998	Leek and Rudyard Railway			
Pendragon	297	2-4-2T	10 1/4 in (260 mm) regauged from 12 1/4 in (311 mm)	1994	Rudyard Lake Railway		Originally Ashorne built for the Ashorne Hall Railway	
Bella	298	2-4-2		1996	Barn Well Hill Railway		Built for the Ashorne Hall Railway	
Exmoor Ranger		0-4-4-0	12 1/4 in (311 mm)		Unknown	Unknown	mostly build never left the works used as parts for other exmoor builds	
Denzil	299	0-4-2T+T	12 1/4 in (311 mm)	1995	Exmoor Steam Railway			
Monty	300	0-4-2T	15 in (381 mm)	1996	Evesham Vale Light Railway		Originally named Markeaton Lady at Markeaton Park Light Railway	
Sandy	301	0-6-0T	15 in (381 mm)	1996	Wotton Light Railway			
Ruby	302	0-4-2T	15 in (381 mm)	1997 (for Brocklands Adventure Park)	New Zealand		Originally named Dennis and was at Lappa Valley Steam Railway until 2025.	
Gillian	304	0-4-2T	7 1/4 in (184 mm)					
Cricor	305	0-4-2T	7 1/4 in (184 mm)	1999	Unknown			
Hunton	306	0-4-2T	7 1/4 in (184 mm)	2000	Unknown			
Jane	307	0-4-2T	7 1/4 in (184 mm)	2000	Pugneys light Railway			
Jools	308	0-4-2T	7 1/4 in (184 mm)	1999	Beer Heights Light Railway	Major rebuild by B.H.L.R completed in 2018	Originally named Samstipur	
Jean	309	0-4-2T	7 1/4 in (184 mm)	2000	Barnards Miniature Railway			
Billy May	310	2-4-2T	7 1/4 in (184 mm)	2000	Woodseaves Miniature Railway		Privately owned	
St. Christopher	311	2-6-2T	15 in (381 mm)	2001	Bressingham Steam Museum & Gardens			
St Egwin	312	0-4-0T+T	15 in (381 mm)	2003	Evesham Vale Light Railway			
Amy Louise	314	0-4-2	7 1/4 in (184 mm)	2003	Barnards Miniature Railway			
Rosemary	315	0-6-2T	12 1/4 in (311 mm)	2001	Exbury Gardens			
Eddy	n/a	0-4-0	12 1/4 in (311 mm)	2001	Exbury Gardens		First non steam loco made by the railway made on frames of a hunslet 24in	
Naomi	316	0-6-2T	12 1/4 in (311 mm)	2002	Exbury Gardens			
The Duchess of Difflin	317	0-4-2T	15 in (381 mm)	2003	Oakfeild Park Railway			
Pulborough	319	0-4-2T	10 1/4 in (260 mm)	2004	South Downs Light Railway			
Dame Ann	320	0-4-2ST	2 ft (610 mm)	2004	Wales West Light Railway			
Doris Hilburn	321	0-4-2T	7 1/4 in (184 mm)	2004	Barnards Miniature Railway		Originally named Audrey	
Brasken	322	0-4-2T	12 1/4 in (311 mm)	2006	Unknown			
ANNE	323	0-6-2T	15 in (381 mm)	2004	Perrygrove Railway		Originally named John Hayton	
King Arthur	324	0-6-2T	10 1/4 in (260 mm)	2005	Leek and Rudyard Railway			
Black Beauty	325	2-6-2	12 1/4 in (311 mm)	2009	Ree Park Safari			
Mariloo	326	2-6-0	12 1/4 in (311 mm)	2008	Exbury Gardens			
Lady Luna	327	0-4-2T	7 1/4 in (184 mm)	2007	Little Western Railway		Originally ran at Wills Garden Railway named Jillie	Lady Luna
	328	0-4-2T	7 1/4 in (184 mm)	2008				
Lorna Doone	330	0-4-2T	12 1/4 in (311 mm)		Exmoor Steam Railway			
Ellie	331	0-4-2T	15 in (381 mm)	2006	Lappa Valley Steam Railway			
Victoria	332	2-4-2	12 1/4 in (311 mm)	2007	Statfold Barn Railway	Operational	Didn't run for 16 years after construction	
Phalaenopsis	333	2-4-2T	10 1/4 in (260 mm)	2008	Unknown	Operational		
Peggy	334	0-4-2T	10 1/4 in (260 mm)	2007	South Downs Light Railway	Operational		
George	335	0-4-2T	10 1/4 in (260 mm)	2010	Leek and Rudyard Railway	Operational		
Barnarda Von Barnards	337	0-4-2T	7 1/4 in (184 mm)	2010	Barnards Miniature Railway	Operational	One of Two O&K Style Exmoors	
Jeremy	338	0-4-2T	7 1/4 in (184 mm)	2010	Wayside Light Railway	Operational	One of Two O&K Style Exmoors	
Maia	339	2-4-2	7 1/4 in (184 mm)	2016	Echills Wood Railways	Operational		
	340	4-4-0	7 1/4 in (184 mm)	2018		Operational		
Arun		0-4-2DH	10 1/4 in (260 mm)	2015	South Downs Light Railway	Operational	Diesel locomotive	
Jack	342	2-6-0	10 1/4 in (260 mm)	2016	Delamont Miniature Railway	Operational		
Sapphire	341	2-4-0	7 1/4 in (184 mm)	2021	Pugneys' Miniature Railway	Operational	Last loco to data made by exmoor	
Carol Ann	350	2-6-2	12 1/4 in (311 mm)	2024	Statfold Barn Railway	Operational	Named and entered service on Mease Valley Light Railway at Statfold Country Park during 'Steam in Miniature' event on Saturday 11 May 2024.	
Pengelly	351	2-4-2	10 1/4 in (260 mm)	2024	North Cornwall Miniature Railway	Operational		
Trelawny	353	2-4-0	10 1/4 in (260 mm)	2026	North Cornwall Miniature Railway	Operational	Unveiled on 21 June 2026	Trelawny on its first running day at the NCMR
