= The Valley Railway Adventure =

Leisure railway in England

Coordinates: 52.1172°N 1.9372°W

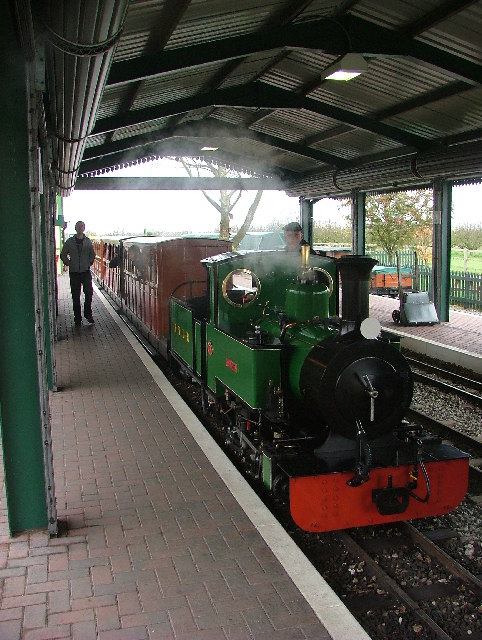
St. Egwin at Evesham Vale Light Railway in May 2005

The Valley Railway Adventure (formerly the Evesham Vale Light Railway) is a 15 in (381 mm) gauge railway that operates in Evesham Country Park in Worcestershire, England.

== Route ==
The railway operates over a total distance of just over 1 mile (1.6 km), from Twyford Station to Evesham Vale Station. Twyford Station is the only terminus on the line, with Evesham Vale Station situated on a balloon loop.

== History ==
The railway was originally built and owned by Jim and Helen Shackell, with public services commencing on 1 August 2002. The railway passed into the ownership of Adrian & Sandra Corke in 2012, without interruption to services. In 2024, the railway was sold to David & Katherine Nelson-Brown who also own the Perrygrove Railway. The railway was renamed to The Valley Railway Adventure. In February/March 2026, significant trackwork took place at Twyford station, with the yard layout and station run-around loop changing. A headshunt was added to the yard, allowing shunting to occur within the yard without the main line being entered.

A small number of passenger coaches have been constructed for the line, but most of those in service are historic vehicles acquired from other lines, notably the Fairbourne Railway in Wales, and the short-lived Chemin de fer de Guerlédan in Brittany.The 5 carriages from Chemin de fer de Guerlédan were sold in 2025. They are being replaced by new coaches (built in the nearby Forest of Dean) which are similar in design to coaches running at the Perrygrove Railway. These are due to come into service sometime in 2026

== Locomotives ==
Locomotive Number	Locomotive Name	Locomotive Type	Year Built	Builder	In service?	Permanent Resident?	Notes
Steam Locomotives							
300	Monty	0-4-2	1996	Exmoor Steam Railway	Yes	Yes (2013-Present)	
312	St Egwin	0-4-0ST+T	2003	Exmoor Steam Railway	Yes	Yes (2003-Present)	Privately owned
323	Anne	0-6-2	2004	Exmoor Steam Railway	No	Yes (2025 - Present)	
Diesel Locomotives							
	Joyce	6wDH			Yes	Yes (2025 - Present)	
	Biscuit	4wPM		Mike Eddy	No	Yes (2014 - Present)	Privately owned - For Sale
Former Locomotives							
5751	Prince William	4-6-2+T	1949	Ernest Twinning and J N Maskelyn	N/A	Yes (2003 - 2012)	Stored out of public View
103	John	4-4-2	1921	Albert Barnes and Company	N/A	Yes (2003 - 2012)	Stored out of public View
32	Count Louis	4-4-2	1924	Bassett-Lowke	N/A	Yes (2003 - 2013)	Privately Owned Stored out of public View
712	N/A	0-4-0	1950	R H Morse	N/A	Yes (2002 - 2012)	Stored out of public View
995	Dougal	4-4-0PM	1939	R H Morse	N/A	Yes (2003 -2012)	Stored out of public View
N/A	Bessie	4wDM	2002	Mike Eddy and Matty Nowel	N/A	Yes (2002 - 2014)	Stored out of public View
3	Dougal	0-6-2ST+T	1970	Severn Lamb	N/A	Yes (2004 - 2025)	Now Owned by Ruislip Lido Railway
452280	Cromwell	4wDH	1960	Ruston and Hornsby	N/A	Yes (2012- 2025)	Now at Haigh hall miniature railway
JGF4	Sludge	4wDM	1955	R A Lister and Company	N/A	Yes (2002 - 2025)	Privately owned - Sold to New Zealand
