= South Downs Light Railway =

UK railway company

Coordinates: 50.954822°N 0.530366°W

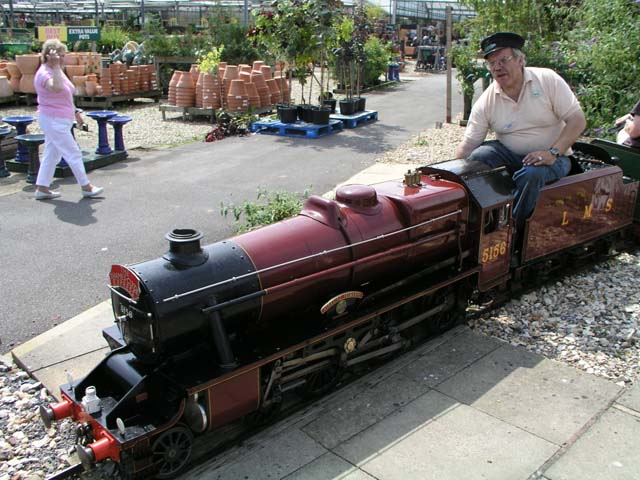
- The Thames Clyde Express On the South Downs Miniature Railway

The South Downs Light Railway is a 10 1/4 in (260 mm) gauge railway at Pulborough in West Sussex, England. The line opened in 2000, after the line was regauged to 10 1/4 in (260 mm) from 7 1/4 in (184 mm), the gauge of the previous line that operated in the grounds of the garden centre before the South Downs Light Railway arrived. The line operates in the grounds of the Pulborough Garden Centre, operating most weekends between March and September throughout the year.

One of their two Exmoor Steam Locomotives will be in-charge of the service. Their two Exmoors are named ‘Pulborough’ and ‘Peggy’; these are the only Locomotives on the line, as it features a wide variety and collection of scaled-down miniature and narrow gauge engines.

The railway has their own engine shed, with a workshop at the back of it. Outside the engine shed, there is a traverser to move the engines, and to the side of the shed is a turntable. There is also a covered drop-down pit so the engines can be inspected underneath. The old engine shed has now been converted to the railway's carriage shed, housing a large variety of operation stock, the carriage shed has had an additional extension to its eastern side to house more stock of the railway's collection.

The railway has two stations, Stopham Road Station, where people start their journey. The station has a canopy and the booking office. There is also Hardham Halt which is not regularly open, however is used during gala days and during Christmas as the North Pole.

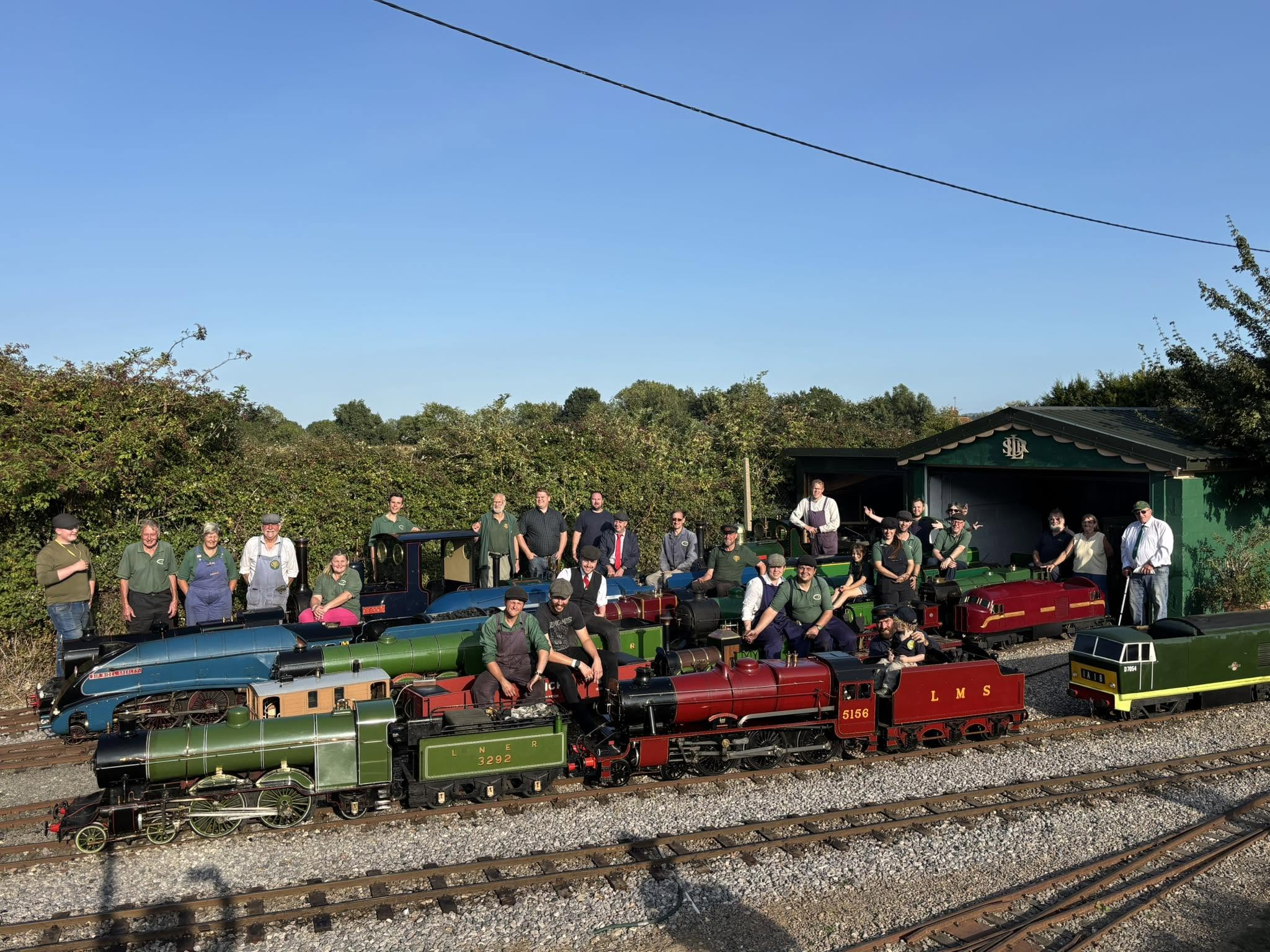
The Locomotive Lineup Post Cavalcade On The 25th Anniversary Gala

2020 was the railway's 20th year of operating in its current location and they hoped to host a 20th Gala Weekend which would have hosted visiting engines plus special attractions. The railway announced that the gala weekend would happen in August, however it was cancelled by the COVID pandemic.

In 2025 the railway celebrated its 25th anniversary. Hosting a gala to celebrate, featuring all available Homefleet locos as long as visitors from the railways history, these being: A4 4498 "Sir Nigel Gresley", Atlantic ‘John Terrance’, Black 5 ‘Ayrshire Yeomary’ and a Class 35 Hymek. The Gala would run for 5 days throughout August with each day having a different theme. It would also feature a cavalcade of every Operational Engine and end with an impressive Lineup Shot.

The railway's developments since they first opened include a extension, new tunnel, new engine shed, new workshop, a new station (Hardham Halt) and a carriage shed expansion.

== Stations on the Line ==
The railway has two stations: Stopham Road which is the main station and where passengers start their journey. The Station is on the site of the old station from the 7 1/4 days, with the original structures (excluding the Signal Box) surviving until 2006, where it would then be demolished to make way for the new station, which was completed in 2007. This redevelopment include a new ticket office as well as impressive platform canopy. It has also since had the platform extended to accommodate ever growing trains on busy days.

The Line has one station at Hardham Halt. Constructed in 2014 and 2015, it was built to serve as a Grotto when Santa visits as well as space for Model Railway displays during Special Events and Glas, it is not regularly open to the public however.

== Signalling ==
In the 7 1/4 days a signal box was constructed at the station, this structure still survives today, more or less looking as it did back then however in Southern Railway green and cream to match the rest of the station. The box houses an 16 lever Westinghouse mini frame, electronically controlling a series of signals and points around the line. In more recent years the box has had a new roof and new stairs, keeping this piece of kit going.

== Locomotives ==
STEAM ENGINES
BUILDER	WHEEL CONFIGURATION	CLASS	NUMBER	NAME	BUILT	NOTES	PHOTO
EXMOOR STEAM RAILWAY	0-4-2	EXMOOR "PULBOROUGH" CLASS	319	"PULBOROUGH"	2004	In service	319 Awaits Departure
EXMOOR STEAM RAILWAY	0-4-2	EXMOOR "PULBOROUGH" CLASS	334	"PEGGY"	2007	In service	334 and 1 Shunting
GILES FAVELL	0-4-2	BAGNALL	1	"ALICE"	2001	In service	1 Waits in the Loop over Lunch
GILES FAEVL / SOUTH DOWNS LIGHT RAILWAY	2-4-2	LYNTON & BARNSTABLE RAILWAY BALDWIN		"THE PRIEST"	UNDER CONSTRUCTION	No progress	
DAVID CURWEN	2-4-2	HUNSLET LARGE QUARRY CLASS	197	"AGAPANTHUS"	1997	In service	197 Rounds the Croner into the Station
JESSE MOODY	4-6-2	SR MERCHANT NAVY CLASS	21C1	"CHANNEL PACKET"	2011	awaiting overhaul	35004 waiting for the Signal to Clear
JESSE MOODY	4-6-2	SR MERCHANT NAVY CLASS	35004	"CUNARD WHITE STAR"	2016	In service	
JESSE MOODY	4-6-0	SR LORD NELSON CLASS	850	"LORD NELSON"	2006	In service	
CARLAND ENGINEERING	4-6-0	LMS ROYAL SCOT CLASS	6100	"ROYAL SCOT"	1948	In service	6100 Rounds the Croner into the Station
ERNEST DOVE	4-6-0	LMS CORONATION CLASS	6220	"CORONATION"	1946	In service	6220 Arrives at Stopham Road
PETER HOWARD	2-6-0	LMS STANNIER MOGUL CLASS	13245		1987	In service	13245 on Shed
ST ROLLOX WORKS	4-4-0	CR DUNALISTAIR CLASS	721	"DUNALISTAIR"			
DAVID CURWEN	4-4-2	GNR C1	4433		1965	In service	4433 Departs the Yard
J.J MAHONY	4-6-2	LNER A3	4472	"FLYING SCOTSMAN"	1934	In service	4433, 4472 & 4498 In a LNER Lineup
STARTED BY G&S LIGHT ENGINEERING FINISHED BY ERNEST DOVE	4-6-0	FREELANCE	27	"THE RAILWAY MISSION"	1947	Awaiting new wheels	
JACK HUDELL	0-6-0	HOLMSIDE	35	"ARTHUR"	1982	Under overhaul	
	0-4-2	L&MR LUGGAGE ENGINE	57	"LION"		In service	Lion On Shed
	0-6-0	FREELANCE	625	"LILY"	2012		
DIESEL & ELECTRIC ENGINES
BUILDER	WHEEL CONFIGURATION	CLASS	NUMBER	NAME	BUILT	NOTES	PHOTO
BUILT BY BOB DAVIES REBUILT BY MOUSE BOILER WORKS	BO-BO	FREELANCE	D113	"GLEN AULDYN"	BUILT 1986 - ONLY LOCO TO BE BUILT IN SCOTTISH HEBRIDEAN ISLANDS REBUILT 2000	In service	D113 Awaits Departure
ROANOKE ENGINEERING	0-4-0	FREELANCE	38	"MERLIN"			
J.CHIVERS	0-4-0	FREELANCE	2	"ODDJOB"		In service	2 Awaiting its Next Duty
J.CHIVERS	0-6-0	GER J70	135	"ANNA"		In service	135 In the Yard
	BO-BO	LMS 10000	10000			Out of service	10000 In the Yard

== Rolling stock ==
The railway hosts a range of passenger rolling stock and the railway hosts a scale freight train which can be seen during most of their events. Their passenger rolling stock consists of three different types of coaches. On a regular running day, the train usually consists of two open-top carriages, an open carriage and then, depending on the weather and the date, either a covered brake coach or an open-top brake coach. There is also an SR Brake Van that is used sometimes. Their scale freight train is seen during their gala days and is worth looking at.
