= Far Tottering and Oyster Creek Branch Railway =

UK railway company

The Far Tottering and Oyster Creek Branch Railway (or Far Tottering and Oyster Creek Railway) was a 15 in (381 mm) gauge miniature railway created by Rowland Emett. A whimsical view of British rural life and embodying his typical fanciful mechanics, it echoed the similar works of Heath Robinson and Rube Goldberg. The railway began in a series of cartoons in Punch magazine in 1939, as the "Far Tottering and Oyster Creek Railway."

== Festival of Britain ==
It was chosen as an attraction for the 1951 Festival of Britain events on the South Bank. As the "Far Tottering and Oyster Creek Branch Railway", the third of a mile long railway carried over two million passengers through Battersea Pleasure Gardens.

== Locomotives ==
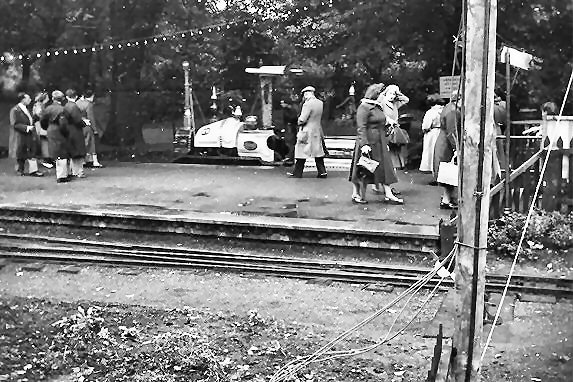
Nellie

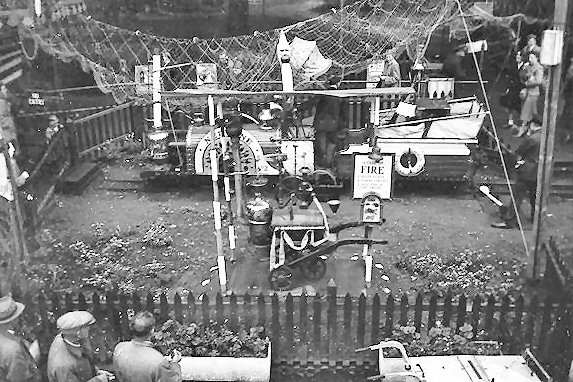
Neptune

The three locomotives were:

No. 1 Nellie
a saddle tank
No. 2 Neptune
as much paddle steamer as locomotive
No. 3 Wild Goose
supposedly made from an airship

They were constructed to Emett's designs by Harry Barlow, using war-surplus Fordson diesel engines on a fifteen inch gauge 4-6-2 chassis. The Barlow chassis of Neptune would later become Prince Charles on the Lakeside Miniature Railway at Southport.

== Operation and 1951 accident ==
Due to the layout of the line (single, sharply curved, with tunnels) it was operated on a form of token system, whereby the trains themselves formed the token. As three trains would be in operation at any one time, and each station had two platforms (one train at each of the two stations, one moving going into the empty platform at the terminus), a train was safe to proceed if the driver could see another train in the platform next to them.

However, on 11 July 1951, two full trains approached head-on on the single track section, close to Oyster Creek station. One woman died and 12 to 13 other people were injured. It is unknown what sequence of events caused this to happen and there appears not to have been a parliamentary enquiry after the accident, although "there were a few ... parliamentary questions".

== Later life and closure ==
After the closure of the Festival, the Pleasure Gardens became part of Battersea Park. The railway continued on the same site until 1953; then was moved to another site in the park as the Festival Gardens Railway. In this form it was about 840 yards (760 metres) long, and ran from a station at the Queen's Gate, parallel to the Eastern and Northern Carriage Drives, to a station at Chelsea Bridge, via a "halt" at the Funfair. It continued with other Barlow locomotives until 1975, when the line closed, partially due to the decline of the funfair itself. Part of a cutting for the line is still visible near the tennis courts.
