= Lakeside Miniature Railway =

Railway company in Merseyside, England

Coordinates: 53.6522°N 3.0123°W

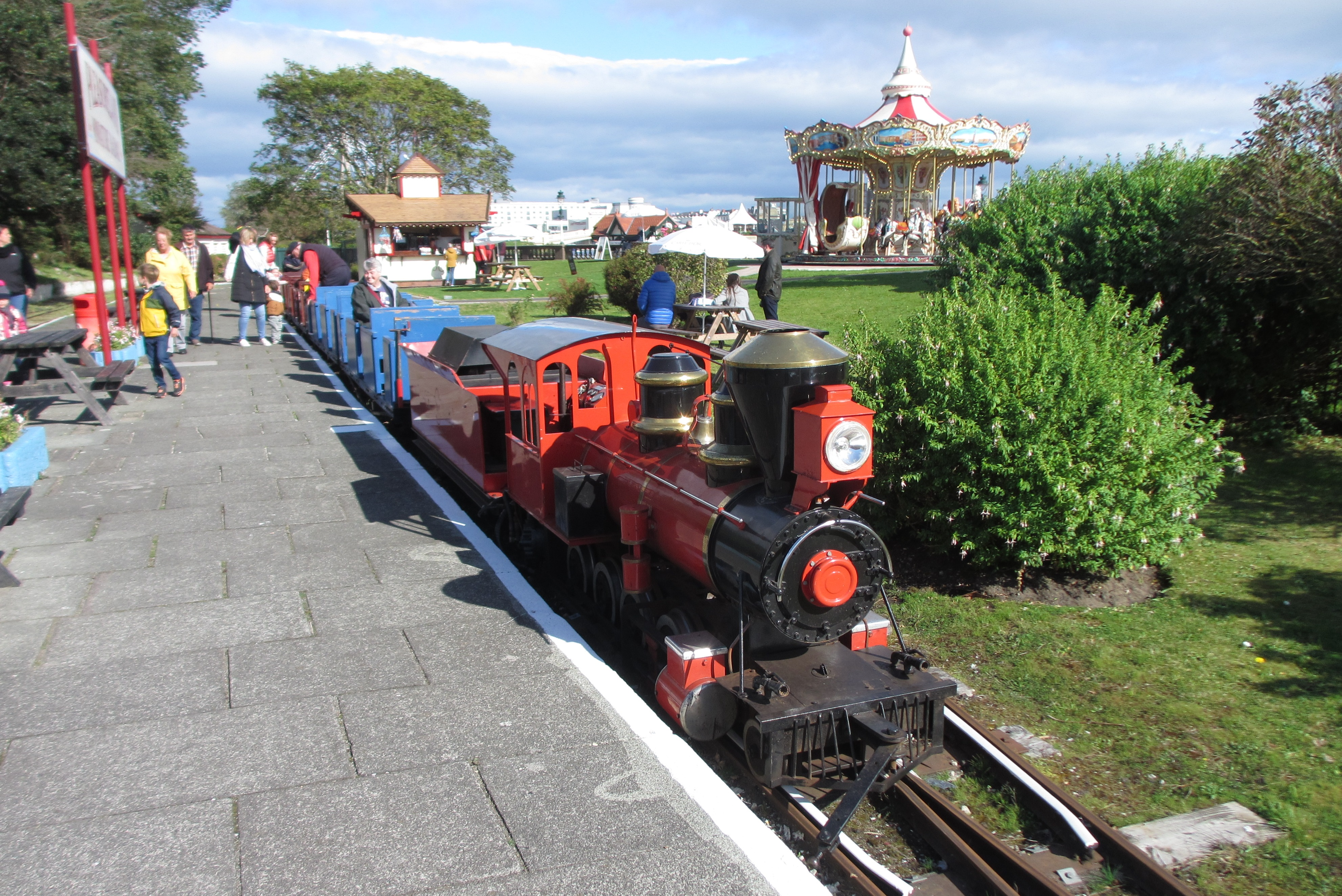

Overview
- Headquarters: Southport
- Locale: Merseyside, England
- Dates of operation: 1911–

Technical
- Track gauge: 15 in (381 mm)
- Length: 750 yards (0.69 km)

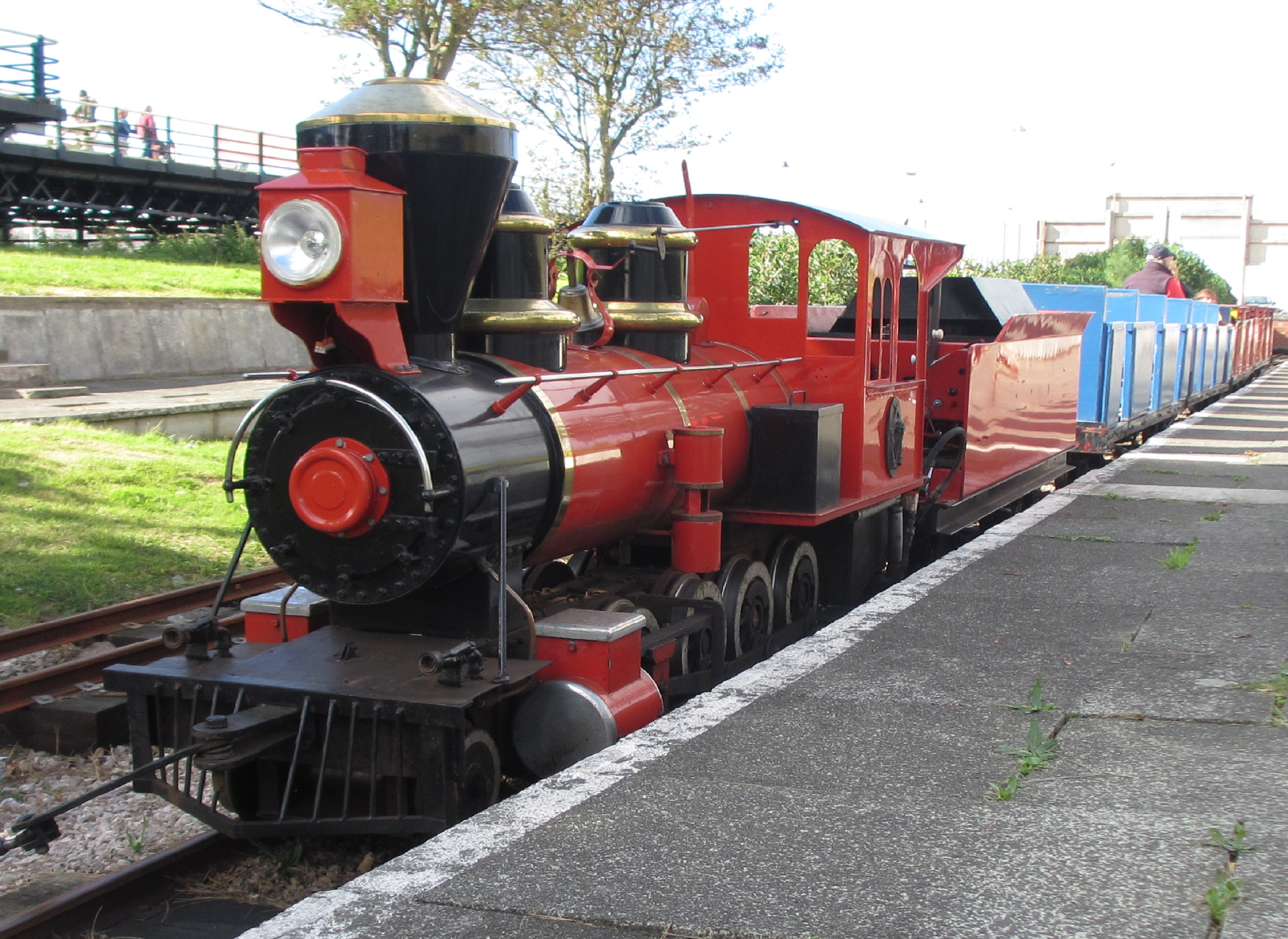
"Wild West" loco added to the railway's fleet in 2020

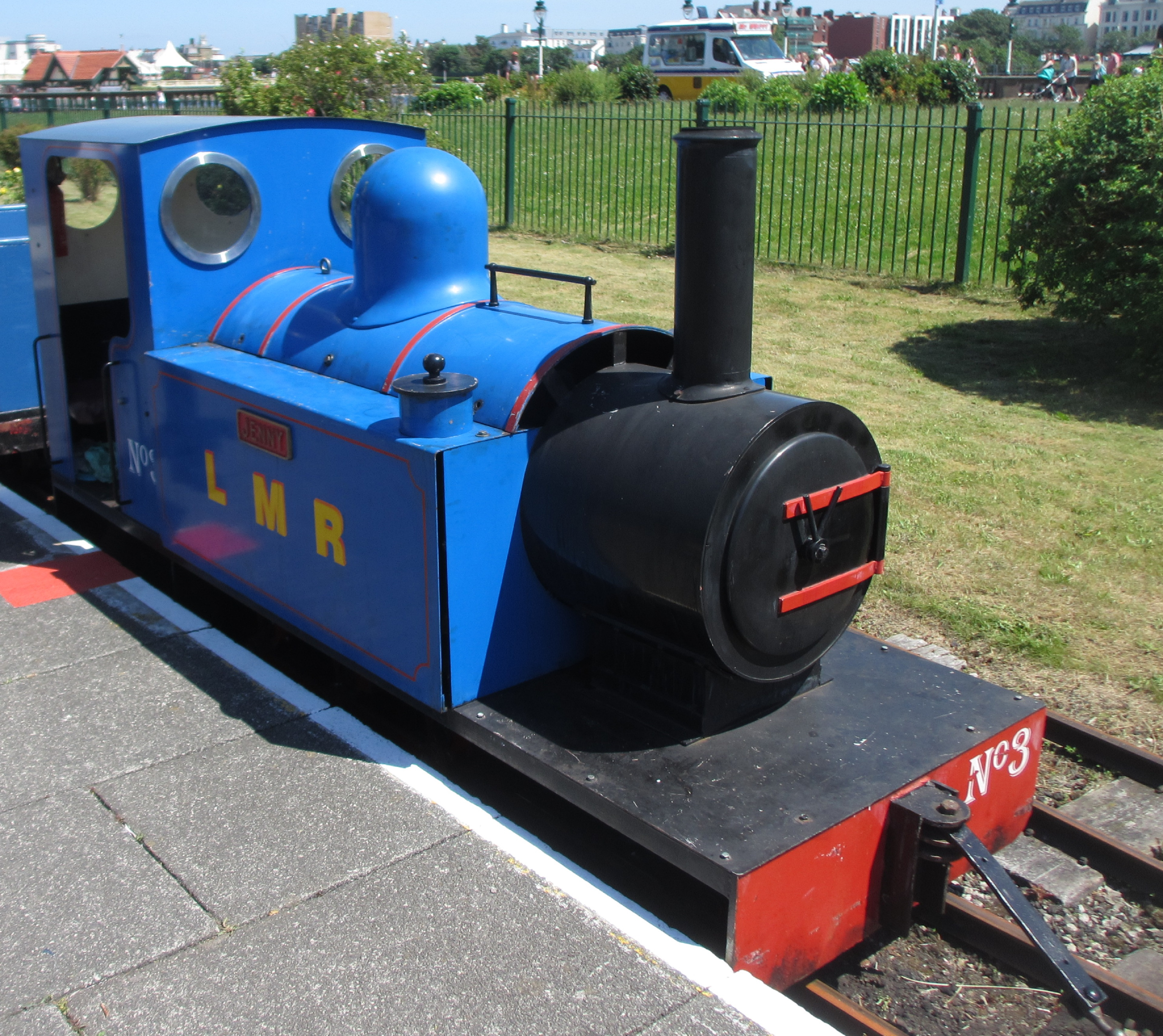
Lakeside Miniature Railway, Southport, England. Locomotive "Jenny"

The 15 in (381 mm) gauge, single track Lakeside Miniature Railway runs along the seaward side of the Marine Lake in Southport, England.

== Route ==
The railway originally consisted of a straight running line on the seaward shore of the Southport Marine Lake with a run-round loop at each end. In 1948 the line was extended northwards under Southport Pier, followed by a sharp 90-degree curve seawards into a new terminus next to and named after Marine Parade. This layout remains today with the round trip covering 1,500 yards (1.4 km).

Early photographs variously name the southern terminus White City, Marine Drive and Lakeside, but it has been referred to as the Pleasureland terminus for many years. In 2020 there were two workshops and an engine shed here, with a single island platform serving two running lines with run-round loops which converge to form the running line alongside the lake. There is also a third siding for stock storage. In 2020 Pleasureland made significant investment in this terminus, adding a short platform on the eastern runround loop, a refreshment kiosk, a traditional roundabout and a helter-skelter, all aimed at the families with young children market.

At the northern, Marine Parade, end of the line there are two platforms, though one has been taken out of use and its track lifted. Locomotives change ends using a run-round loop. The original station building at Marine Parade was completely rebuilt around 2010 but was demolished in 2019, leaving the floor tiles in place to show it's outline. In summer 2020 a temporary refreshment facility was installed to test the market.

The line is fully fenced and has no level crossings, it is unsignalled and operates on a one engine in steam basis.

The original northern terminus was named Princes Park, it closed when the line was extended. In 2020 the station building was still in good external condition.

== History ==
The railway was built in 1911, with the first train on 25 May. It was constructed by Miniature Railways of Great Britain Ltd using materials provided by the model engineering business Bassett-Lowke. Henry Greenly provided expert engineering advice. The line was originally named Southport Miniature Railway, being operated by Dr Ladmore, a local dentist. Mr Griffiths Vaughan Llewelyn took the railway over after some years, renaming it Llewelyn's Miniature Railway. It passed from Llewelyn's hands before 1930, becoming Lakeside Miniature Railway, which it remains today. In 1945 the railway was sold to Harry Barlow who owned a local engineering company famous for building miniature locomotives. In 1968 John Spencer, a Pleasureland stallholder, purchased the railway and did much to improve it and tidy it up. In 2001 the line was sold again, this time to Don Clark, most recently being bought by Pleasureland Southport in 2016. It was forced to close during the 2016 season because the heavily worn track led to derailments on the sharp curve. Extensive work on the track and route led to the line reopening in 2017, with an operational fleet of one locomotive - "Jenny". By 2020 Jenny was showing signs of heavy use; the railway exchanged its three unserviceable, stored locomotives for a fully operational Severn Lamb "Wild West" outline Diesel-hydraulic 2-8-0. This locomotive was supplied new to West Midland Safari Park in 1979. Its engine was replaced by a Perkins 404D22 model in 2011. It was moved to Windmill Farm in 2015.

The railway featured in scenes in the 1985 Goldcrest Films production Mr Love starring Barry Jackson and Maurice Denham.

The railway is one of the earliest of its type still running on its original route. Rhyl Miniature Railway opened on 1 May 1911 and still runs, but it closed during the Second World War, whilst Lakeside Miniature Railway remained open. The line therefore claims to be the oldest continuously running 15 in (381 mm) gauge railway in the world.

== Locomotives ==
The line originally had two steam locomotives of the Bassett-Lowke Class 10 'Atlantic' 4-4-2 design, named King George and Princess Elizabeth, they were later supplemented by Katie, an 0-4-0 side tank built by that pioneer of the minimum gauge Sir Arthur Heywood. Where the two Bassett-Lowke locos had been supplied new Katie was third hand, having already worked on the Eaton Hall Railway (where she hauled a Royal train in 1897) and the Ravenglass and Eskdale Railway in Cumbria. She did not spend long at Southport, arriving in 1919 and being sold on again in 1923 to the Fairbourne Miniature Railway.

The Bassett-Lowke locos were sufficient for the original trains but as Southport increased in popularity as a holiday destination trains became busier and the locos were rebuilt to the larger class 30 standard.

In 1948 the railway's motive power took a step towards the future with the building of a petrol-electric loco of 4-6-2 wheel arrangement with a tender, built to look like Gresley's famous LNER Class A4 locomotives. The loco was built in Southport by Mr. Harry Barlow who had taken over the railway in 1945. These were the first of eight 15-inch gauge diesel-electric locomotives built by Barlow for a variety of railways. They used war-surplus Fordson engines with Tilling-Stevens generators and motors.

The original locomotive of this type was named Duke of Edinburgh with Prince Charles following in 1954 and Golden Jubilee in 1963. Golden Jubilee, although of the same basic design of the other two lost the A4 styling, being replaced by a box-shaped body and a loss of the steam outline wheels, the wheel arrangement being modified to 4-6-0 configuration.

All three of these Barlow locos still exist on the railway, their Fordson tractor petrol engines having been replaced by more modern economical diesels.

In 1971 another loco joined the fleet, a Severn Lamb product built to look like a Western Diesel, its wheel configuration is Co-Co with diesel-hydraulic drive.

A little known loco which ran on the line was No. 14, a small 0-4-0PM shunter with Mechanical transmission. It was built for the line by Gordon Walker in 1985 using a 1000cc Austin engine and a Hudson coach bogie. No 14 was designed for permanent way work though it could in fact haul 6 of the line's articulated coaches. It was not successful, mainly because of the crude belt drive. It was moved in 1990, being acquired by Austin Moss of the Windmill Farm Railway.

In 2005 a new locomotive was commissioned for the railway. it was delivered in 2006. Jenny is a 2-6-2DH steam-outline locomotive built at Windmill Farm. It is a sit-in locomotive with an overall cab for the driver and is of tank engine appearance.

In 2011 the Railway celebrated is 100-year centenary as the longest continually running railway. (Just behind the oldest, which is Rhyl, This was closed though during the wars)

In 2015 The railway changed ownership and became part of Pleasureland Southport. In 2018 The railway was renamed "Pleasureland Miniature Railway". This was the third name change in its history.

=== Locomotives currently owned by the railway ===
Loco Name	Year built	Builder	Motive power	Based on	Wheel Arrangement	Locomotive Number	Notes
Jenny	2006	A Moss	Diesel-hydraulic	Tank engine outline	2-6-2DH	3	Not operational
Rio Grande	1979	Severn Lamb	Diesel-hydraulic	Wild West	2-8-0DH		Arrived July 2020 Works plates originally read: SL 15/2/79

=== Locomotives previously owned by the railway ===
Loco Name	Year built	Builder	Motive power	Based on	Wheel Arrangement	Locomotive Number	Notes
Katie	1896	Heywood, at Duffield Bank	Steam	Tank engine	0-4-0T	Works No. 4	Sent to Fairbourne Miniature Railway in 1923 in exchange for Prince Edward of Wales. Dismantled 1926. Not to be confused with later 2-4-2 also named Katie.
Prince Edward of Wales Later renamed King George	1916	Bassett-Lowke	Steam	LBSCR Atlantic	4-4-2	Class 20, No. 21	Arrived from Fairbourne Miniature Railway in 1923 in exchange for Katie. Ran at Southport until 1969 then at Whorlton Lido Railway, Co. Durham until it closed around 1984. Now privately owned and under restoration.
Prince of Wales	1908	Bassett-Lowke	Steam	LBSCR Atlantic	4-4-2	Class 10, No.11	built for Sutton miniature railway as mighty atom brought by the line sometime before 1919. in 1929 Prince of Wales was sold to yarmouth miniature railway before in 1938 being sold back to sutton. Now at rhyl in scrap yard condition, after a failed attempt to restore the loco in 2008 by cclr where parts of the loco was stolen.
King George V	1911	Bassett-Lowke	Steam	LBSCR Atlantic	4-4-2	Class 10, No.18	Ran at Steamtown, Carnforth after Southport, now in California, USA.
Prince of Wales, later Princess Elizabeth<	1915	Bassett-Lowke	Steam	LBSCR Atlantic	4-4-2	Class 20, No 22	Fire damaged 1938, later ran at Steamtown, Carnforth, now in California, USA.
Prince Charles	1951	H N Barlow	Diesel-electric	A4 Steam outline	4-6-2DE	2510	Not operational, at Windmill Farm May 2017, a sister with the same name is at Saltburn Miniature Railway
Red Dragon	1990	G Walker & A Moss	Steam	NBR Atlantic	4-4-2	-	Now at rhyl miniature railway as 99 Prince Edward of Wales.
Rio Grande	1979	Severn Lamb	Diesel-hydraulic	Wild West	2-8-0DH	278	Now at the Cleethorpes Coast Light Railway. Works plates: 17/6/79
None	1985	G Walker	Petrol-mechanical	-	0-4-0PM	14	Now at Windmill Farm
Duke of Edinburgh	1948	H N Barlow	Diesel-electric	A4 Steam outline	4-6-2DE	4468	Moved to Windmill Farm July 2020
Golden Jubilee 1911-1961	1963	H N Barlow	Diesel-electric	Custom design, box shaped	4-6-0DE	-	Moved to Windmill Farm July 2020
Princess Anne	1971	Severn Lamb	Diesel-hydraulic	Western diesel outline	Co-Co	1B19	Moved to Windmill Farm July 2020

== Services ==
The railway operates during weekends and school holidays from Easter to October. Trains do not run to a timetable, but shuttle back and forth, generally from 11am to 5pm/6pm, though bad weather can lead to cancellation or early closure. Services recommenced after the winter season on 26 March 2022.

== See also ==
- Miniature railways
- West Lancashire Light Railway
