= Orland, Newville and Pacific Railroad =

Miniature railway in Orland, California

Coordinates: 39.7421°N 122.1808°W

The Orland, Newville and Pacific Railroad is a 15 in (381 mm) gauge miniature railway built to a scale of 5 inches to the foot. It is located in Orland, California, on the Glenn County Fairgrounds located on East Yolo Street. It has been operating at the same location since 1993.

== See also ==
- Orland station
- List of heritage railways
