= Miniature Train at Monarch Park =

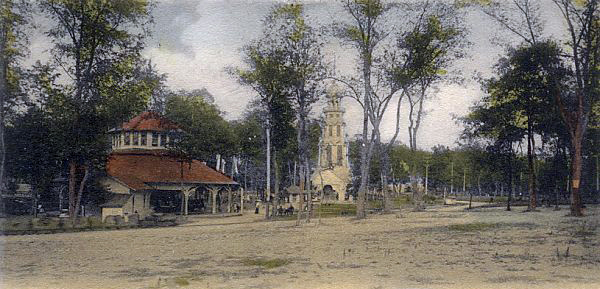
Miniature Train at Monarch Park, Oil City, Pennsylvania

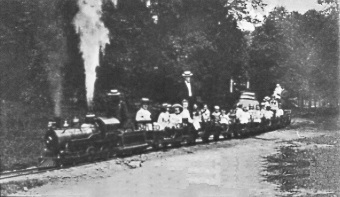
Armitage-Herschell locomotive at Monarch Park

The Miniature Train at Monarch Park was a 15 in (381 mm) gauge miniature railway at Oil City, Pennsylvania around 1901.

== Operation ==
The park’s Miniature Train was hauled by a steam locomotive, which was built like a standard trunk line steam locomotive. The locomotive and its tender were scale models, the passenger cars were open-air. In making its rounds, it stopped periodically to replenish coal and water. Among the engineers were Charlie Thomas, Dick O’Neil, and a person of short stature named George Hawks, who was very popular with his passengers. The trains ran on a circular track laid with 8 pounds per yard (3.97 kg/m) T-rails spiked to miniature sleepers.

== Locomotive ==
The lilliputian locomotive was made around 1901 by the Armitage-Herschell Company in North Tonawanda, New York, when miniature railways were coming into favour. Their locomotives could pull up to 10 passenger cars, having seating capacity for 40 children or 20 adults. The locomotive was a facsimile of the regular type of passenger steam locomotives.
