= Blenheim Park Railway =

British miniature railway

Coordinates: 51.8389°N 1.3505°W

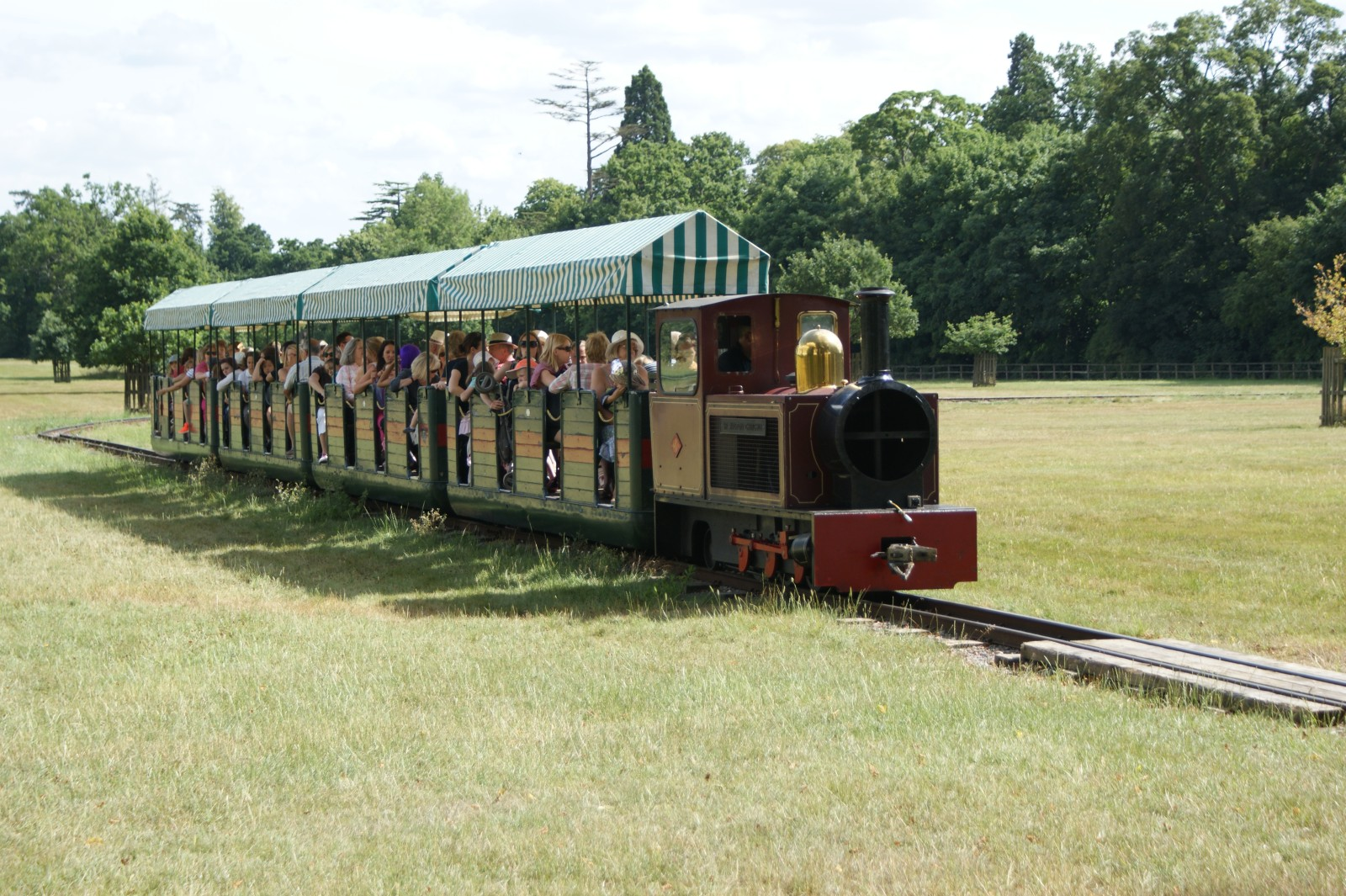

Overview
- Locale: Blenheim Palace, Oxfordshire, England
- Dates of operation: 1975–

Technical
- Track gauge: 15 in (381 mm)
- Length: 1,000 yards (910 m)

Blenheim Park Railway is a 15 in (381 mm) gauge miniature railway operating in the grounds of Blenheim Palace, in Oxfordshire, England.

== History ==
A portable track for a very small gauge railway was run from 1955, but in 1960 a permanent oval track was built to the south-west of the Palace, with a short spur to engine sheds. This ran until 1987 and was then dismantled and rebuilt at Cutteslowe Park north of Oxford, where it still runs a regular service. In 1975 a larger gauge linear track was installed nearby, running return trips from what was then the Garden Centre and Butterfly House to the Palace. The new railway opened as a tourist attraction within 'The Pleasure Gardens', an area of visitor facilities inside the grounds of the Palace, but some distance from the house itself. Miniature railway operating company 'Pleasurerail' operated the service on a short out-and-back line. There were no passing loops or run-round loops, so the line was push-pull operated. The original locomotive was named Sir Winston Churchill (not to be confused with the current locomotive of the same name), and was later joined by locomotives Muffin and Tracy-Jo.

== Later Development ==
The facilities at The Pleasure Gardens include a maze, a plant centre, a cafeteria, the popular butterfly house, and the main car park for visitors. The railway was adapted to provide an actual transport facility between the Pleasure Gardens and Blenheim Palace itself, and during the tourist season trains run in each direction every half-hour. The line is now an end-to-end operation laid out roughly in the shape of a figure '7', and extending over a distance of 1,000 yards (910 m). There are run-round loops at each terminal station, and there was a central passing loop allowing the operation of two trains. This loop has now had one set of points removed, thus changing it into a siding. The line also has a three-road engine and stock storage shed.

== 2013/14 Replacement ==
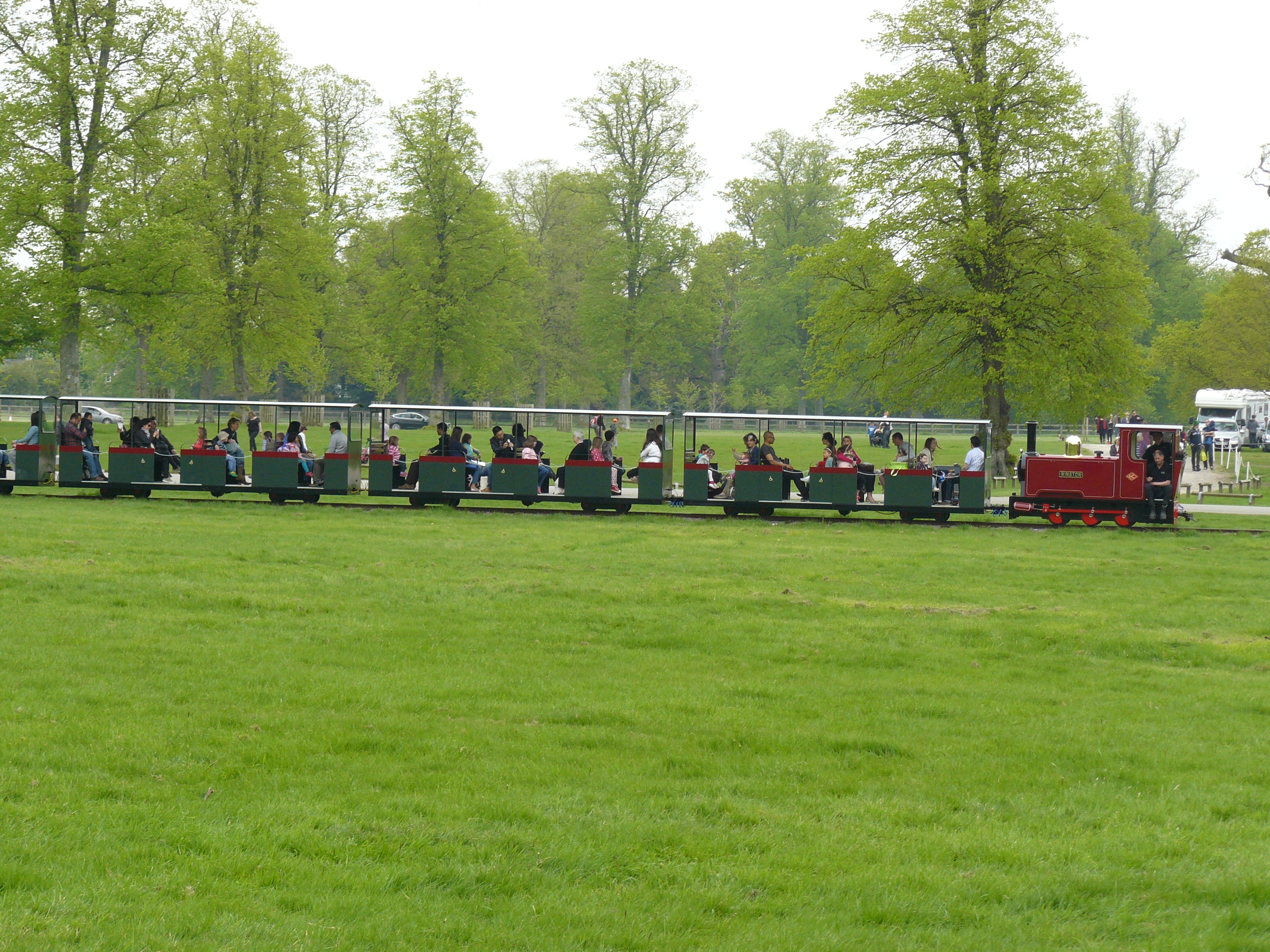
The new (2014) coaches and locomotive in service.

Over the winter of 2013/14 the original passenger carriages were replaced with new carriages constructed by Alan Keef Engineering. A new engine named simply Winston also entered service, replacing the locomotive Anna which was sold. A 31 m (100 ft) tunnel was added which also serves as a storage shed for the new carriages, and as a result of this investment a small charge was introduced to cover the costs.

== Rolling stock ==
=== Passenger carriages ===
The three original passenger carriages were 16-seat semi-open vehicles, painted dark green, with canvas canopy type roofs originally made in Germany in the 1930s. In 1994 a fourth matching coach was built by Alan Keef. These vehicles remained in service until 2014, when they were sold.
