= Rhiw Valley Light Railway =

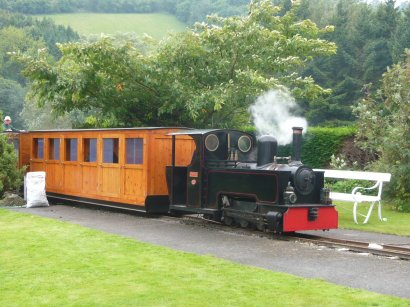
- Powys arriving at the station
- Locale: Powys
- Coordinates: 52.6165°N 3.2679°W

Commercial operations
- Name: Rhiw Valley Light Railway
- Built by: Jack Woodroffe
- Original gauge: 15 in (381 mm)

Preserved operations
- Stations: 1
- Length: 1,265 m (1,383 yd)
- Preserved gauge: 15 in (381 mm)

Commercial history
- Opened: 1970
- Closed: 2 October 2022

The Rhiw Valley Light Railway was a 15 in (381 mm) gauge railway located near to the village of Berriew in Powys, Wales. It closed on 2 October 2022.

== The Railway ==
The railway is constructed to 15 in (381 mm) gauge, in an 'out and back' return loop of 1,265 metres (1,383 yd). As an 'out and back' loop, trains return to the central station facing in the opposite direction from that in which they departed. The railway was privately built and operated, and its original owner is now deceased. The railway is now owned by his widow, who initially opened the line to the public just one day per year, in mid-summer. The railway is now open once a month from May to October. The very attractive route runs through fields and along hedgerows, and being largely unfenced there is considerable interaction with livestock from rabbits to sheep. However the railway announced that it would stop operating after the 2022 season.

== Rolling Stock ==
There are two resident steam locomotives. 'Powys' is a powerful 0-6-2T engine, built in 1973 by Severn Lamb. 'Jack' is a large 0-4-0 tender engine, constructed by TMA Engineering of Birmingham and Jack Woodroffe of Welshpool in 2003. An assortment of wooden passenger carriages (both bogie carriages and four-wheel vehicles) and wagons is available on the line.

== Gallery ==
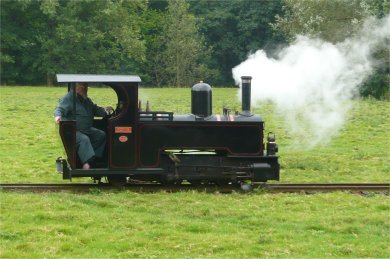
Powys right side view

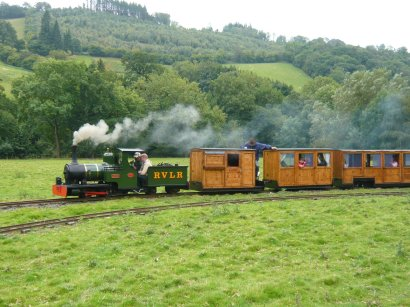
Jack departing on loop

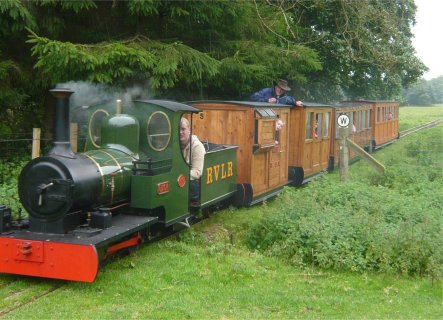
Jack returning on loop

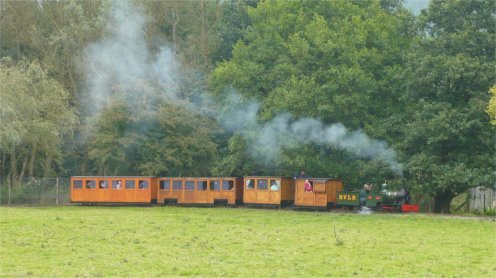
RVLR - Jack

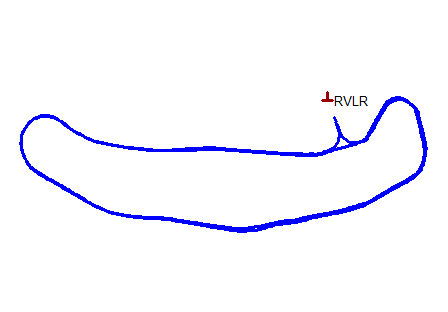
Track map (produced by GPS Utility)
