= Rough and Tumble Engineers Historical Association =

The Rough and Tumble Engineers Historical Association puts on the second- or third-oldest Threshermen’s Reunion in the United States. It is held in the middle of August each year, from Wednesday through Saturday, in Kinzers, Pennsylvania, about eight miles east of the city of Lancaster. The association’s name is taken from the 1890s book Rough and Tumble Engineering: Book of Instructions for Operators of Farm and Traction Engines by James H. Maggard.

== Threshermen ==
Threshermen were crews of laborers who owned their own traction engine and threshing machinery, and moved from farm to farm to bring in and thresh the wheat harvest. Many crews covered several states and several hundred miles each season. Farmers and their wives would compete to gain and keep the services of the best threshing crews. Threshermen were made obsolete by the development of the combine harvester in the 1940s and 1950s.

== Reunions ==
The first Rough and Tumble reunion was held in 1948 on the grounds of Arthur S. Young's farm equipment dealership south of U.S. Route 30 at the east end of Kinzers, Pennsylvania, about eight miles (13 km) east of the city of Lancaster. Young and his father had maintained a number of steam traction engines, and Young served as an officer of the Pennsylvania Threshermen and Farmers Protective Association. A number of local steam engine enthusiasts encouraged Young to hold a Threshers Reunion to showcase his collection of engines, and the PTFPA agreed to provide free food and advertising for the event. The Rev. Elmer Ritzman, the founding editor of Iron Man Album (a magazine devoted to preserving the heritage of threshing and farm life in general, now owned by Ogden Publications and titled Steam Traction Magazine) was a major proponent of the first R&T show, and served as an R&T director for many years.

== Traction engine collection ==
R&T has one of the world’s best and largest collections of old traction engines, with over two dozen machines. There are also all kinds of antique farm implements and machinery, plus three barns full of old steam engines and old stationary gas engines, including an Otto-Langen Engine, one of the world’s few surviving examples of the first commercially successful gas engines, almost all of which are kept in operating condition, and are run during the Threshermen’s Reunion and other shows. There is also a 2/3 scale Shay side-geared steam locomotive that provides rides, as well as a smaller live steam locomotive named Little Toot. Most of the events, especially the Threshermen’s Reunion, has scores of crafters, including local Amish and Mennonite residents, and scores of flea market vendors who come from all over the country.

In addition to the Threshermen’s Reunion held in the middle of August, R&T offers a two-day “Steam School” of hands-on learning, an Antique Tractor Pull in April, a Spring Steam-Up in May, Blacksmith Days in June, and a celebration of A Time of Harvest in October. Additionally, various collectors associations hold events at R&T, including John Deere Days and an International Harvester / Farmall show.

== Railroads ==
The association runs two railroads on its property for guest to enjoy. One is the 2 ft 6 in (762 mm) narrow gauge Shay Railroad, featuring a coal-fired, geared steam locomotive. The other is the 15 in (381 mm) Little Toot Railroad, a ridable miniature railway featuring a locomotive built by Crown Metal Products.
