= Orland station =

Train stop in Glenn County, California

Orland, CA
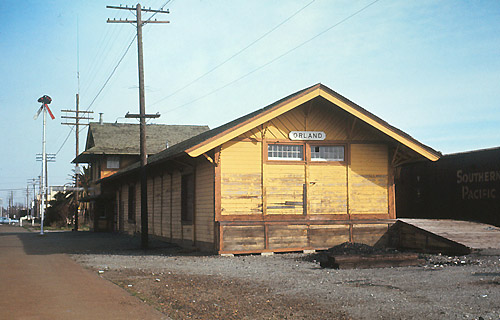
- The station in its original location in 1969

General information
- Location: 523 Colusa Street, Orland, California 95963 (as active station); 221 East Yolo Street, Orland, California 95963 (current depot location)
- Coordinates: 39.743511°N 122.180953°W

History
- Opened: July 31, 1882 (Northern Railway); September 15, 1974 (Amtrak)
- Closed: c. 1960s (SP); April 25, 1982 (Amtrak)

Former services
Preceding station	Amtrak	Following station
Davis toward Los Angeles	Coast Starlight	Redding toward Seattle
Preceding station	Southern Pacific Railroad	Following station
Willows toward Oakland Pier	Shasta Route Via West Side Sacramento Valley	Corning toward Portland
Location

Orland was a Southern Pacific Railroad station in Orland, California. The Northern Railway built the line out from Colusa County to Orland, opening for traffic on July 31, 1882. The railroad had assumed management of the town site a few years earlier. The Klamath served the station as late as 1954, and ran between Portland and Oakland, but the stop did not appear in the 1966 timetables. After Amtrak took over nationwide passenger operations, the state lobbied the company in 1974 to add the station as a stop on the Coast Starlight route, running daily from Los Angeles to Seattle. While the station saw service for a time, it was bypassed in 1982. The station building was subsequently moved to Glenn County Fairgrounds.

== See also ==
- Orland, Newville and Pacific Railroad
