= Heatherslaw Light Railway =

Heritage railway in Northumberland, England

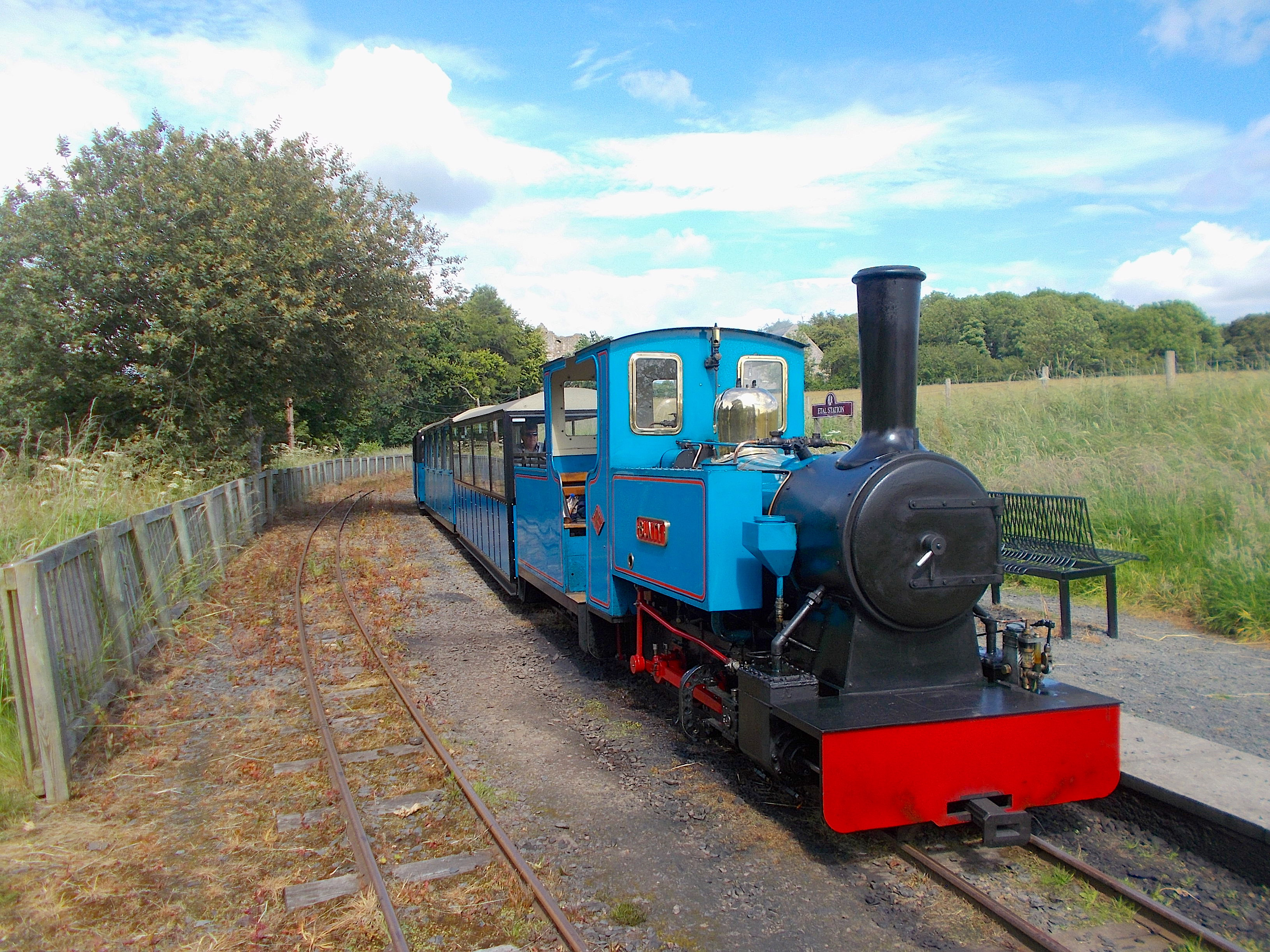
- Alan Keef 2-6-0TT 'Bunty' and train are seen at Etal Castle Station
- Locale: Northumberland, England
- Terminus: Heatherslaw
- Coordinates: 55.639°N 2.121°W

Preserved operations
- Length: 2 Miles
- Preserved gauge: 15 in (381 mm)

The Heatherslaw Light Railway is a 15 in (381 mm) gauge passenger carrying railway near Ford, Northumberland, England, close to the border with Scotland.

Founded by Neville Smith and Sid Ford, the railway opened in 1989 on the Ford and Etal estate. It operates over a route from Heatherslaw to Etal Village, a return trip of 4 miles (6.4 km). The railway operates an hourly service with steam trains (subject to availability) from March to October. Steam hauled Santa Specials run on selected weekends in December. The passenger coaches include facilities for transporting wheelchairs and buggies, and a typical summer season eight-coach train can convey up to 90 passengers.

== Motive power ==
The railway's first locomotive from its opening was a 0-4-2T steam engine named "The Lady Augusta". Lady Augusta was nominally built by the Ravenglass & Eskdale Railway but was subcontracted to Kirklees Light Railway and entered service in 1989. Lady Augusta became the spare loco when Bunty (see below) arrived. Although it was expected that Lady Augusta would leave the railway at the end of 2015 she was retained for occasional use and to cover periods of maintenance on Bunty.

The second locomotive, a diesel hydraulic locomotive named "Clive", is used for works trains. This was built on site at Heatherslaw by Neville Smith and Sid Ford and was rebuilt in 2018 with a partial rebody.

In 2010, a third locomotive, partially built by Neville Smith and Sid Ford, was completed by Alan Keef. The loco has been named "Bunty", Neville's nickname for his wife, Bernice.

A new-build diesel locomotive, "Binky", was built in-house during 2015 becoming the railway's fourth locomotive and entered service at the start of 2016. Bunty will remain the main locomotive hauling passenger trains. Binky is used for February half-term trains and as the "Thunderbird" loco.

== Stations ==
The station at Heatherslaw features an overall roof covering one concrete-slabbed platform; turntable, a third line serves as a locomotive release road for engines to run round trains; there are also storage sidings and sheds, as well as a ticket office and shop. The station at Etal Castle has a simple terminal run round loop and a turntable. The provision of turntables at both ends of the line allows the locos to always run facing forwards whilst hauling passenger trains.

== Gallery ==
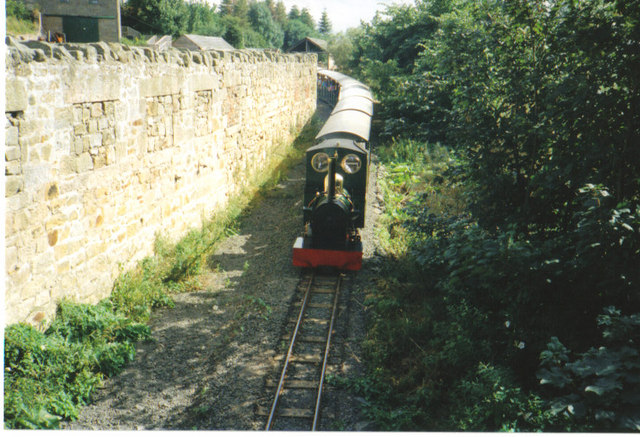
The Heatherslaw Light Railway in 1993.

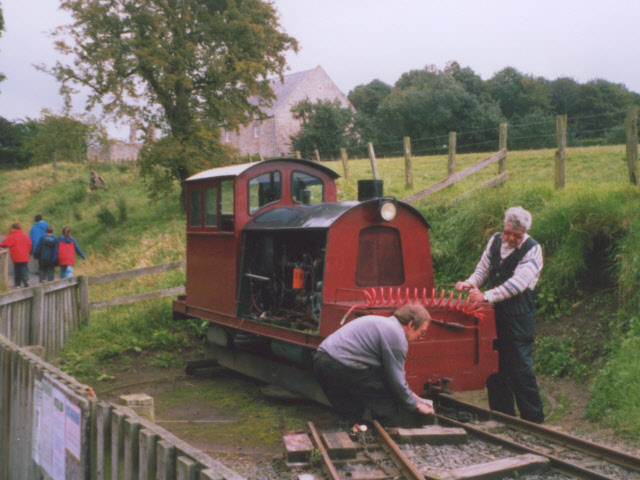
Diesel locomotive "Clive" on the turntable at Etal.

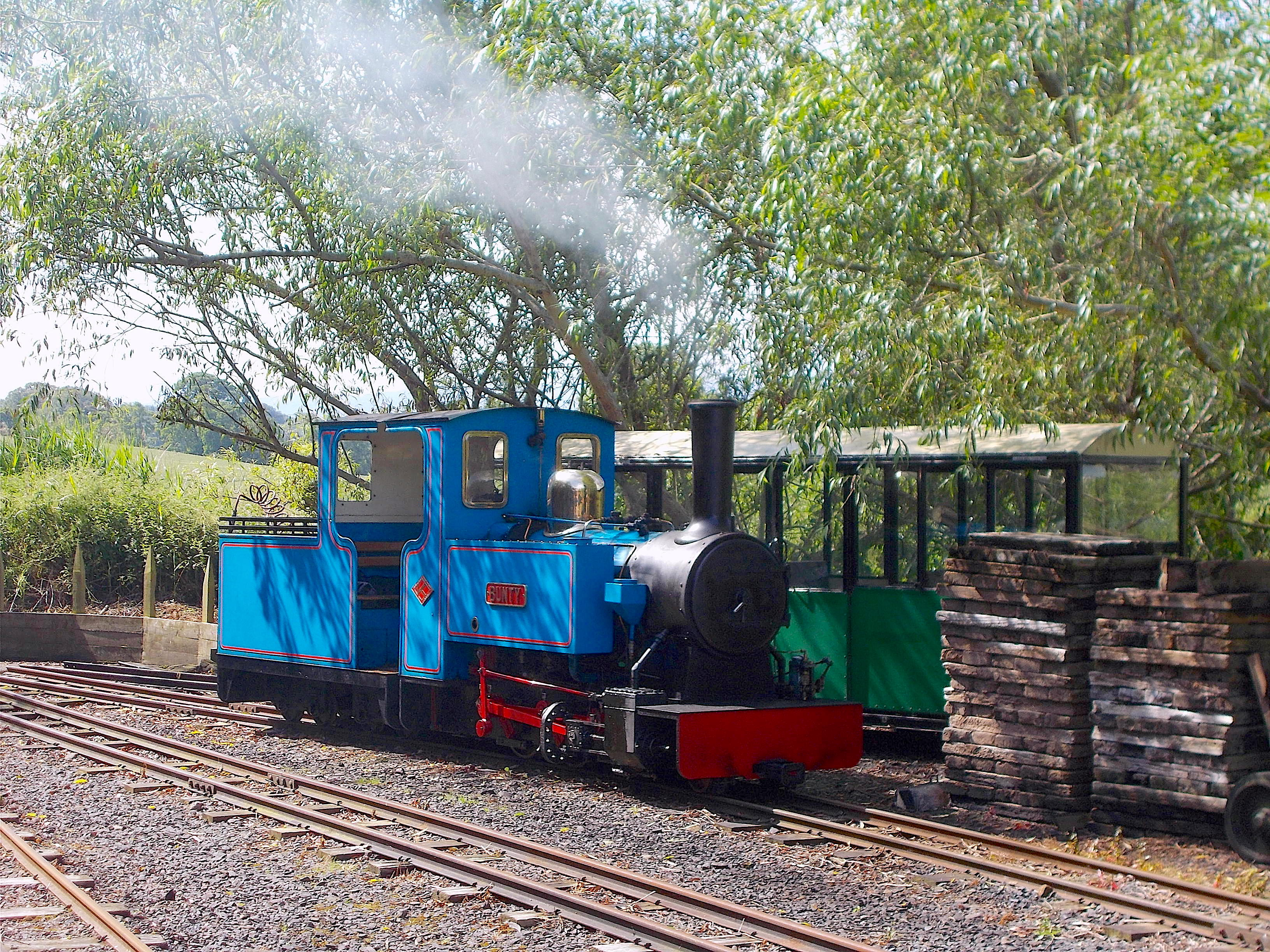
Alan Keef 2-6-0TT "Bunty" runs round the train at Heatherslaw Station

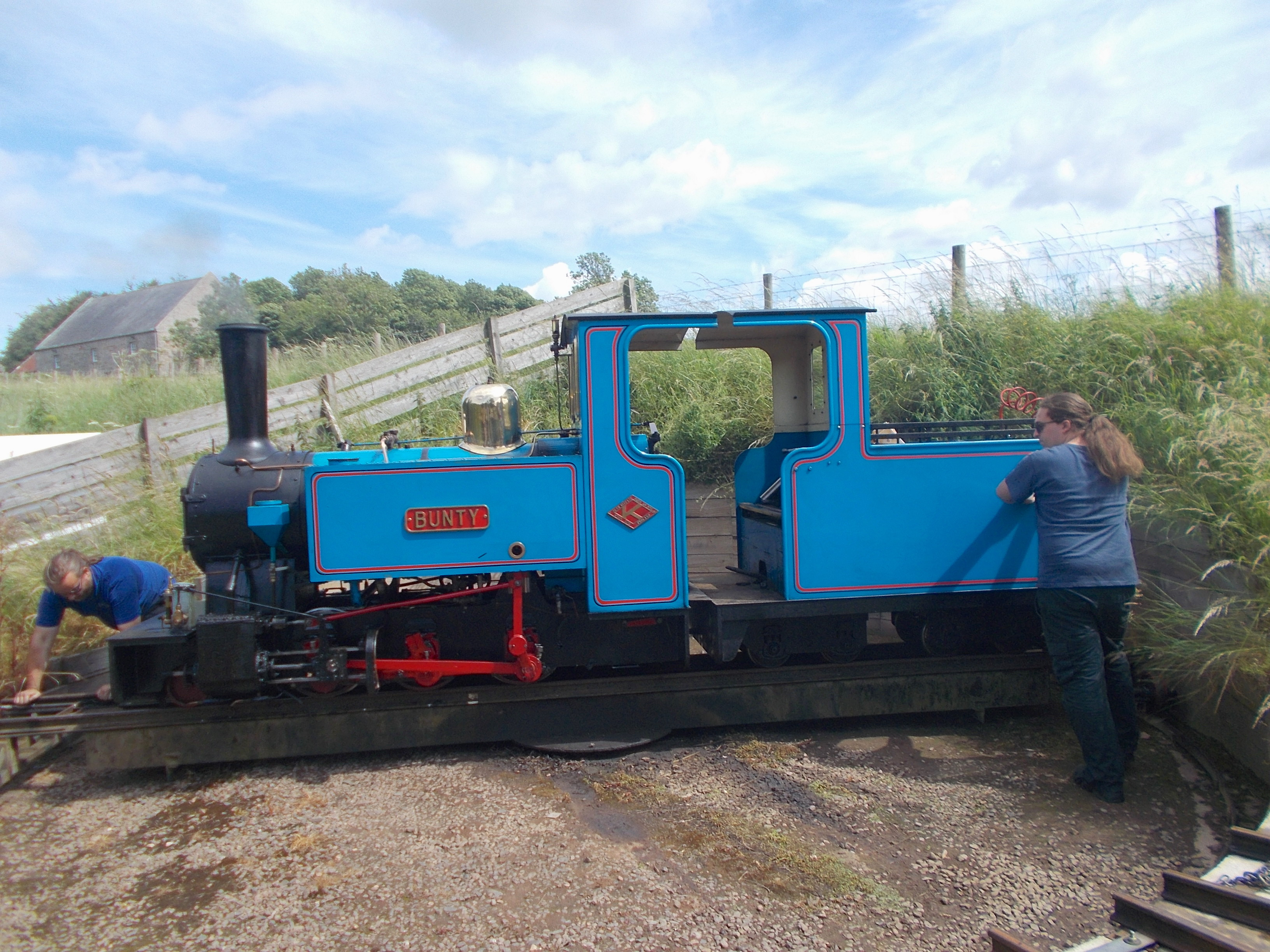
Alan Keef 2-6-0TT "Bunty" being turned on the turntable at Etal Station

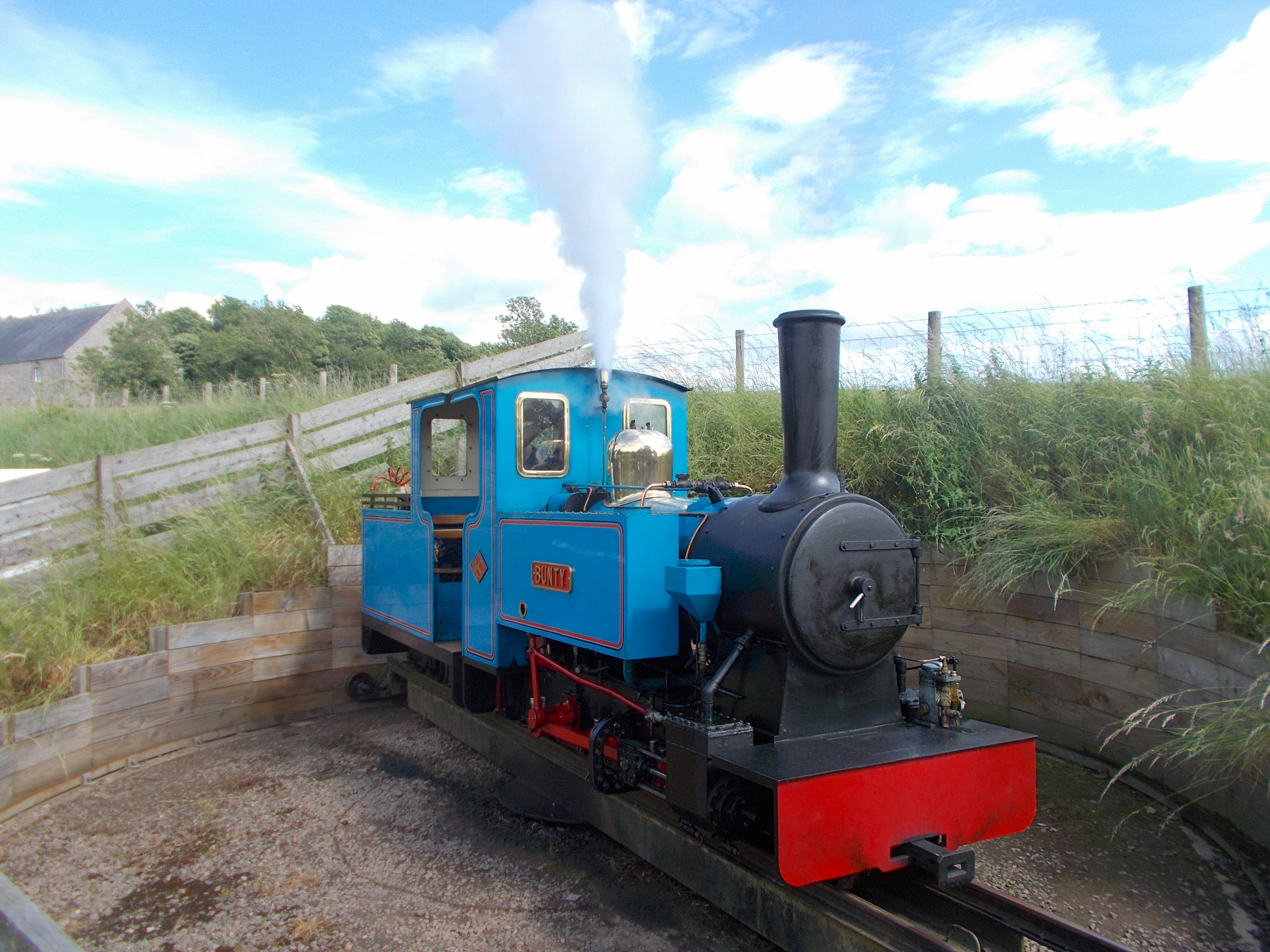
Alan Keef 2-6-0TT "Bunty" stands on the turntable at Etal Station and whistles prior to moving off

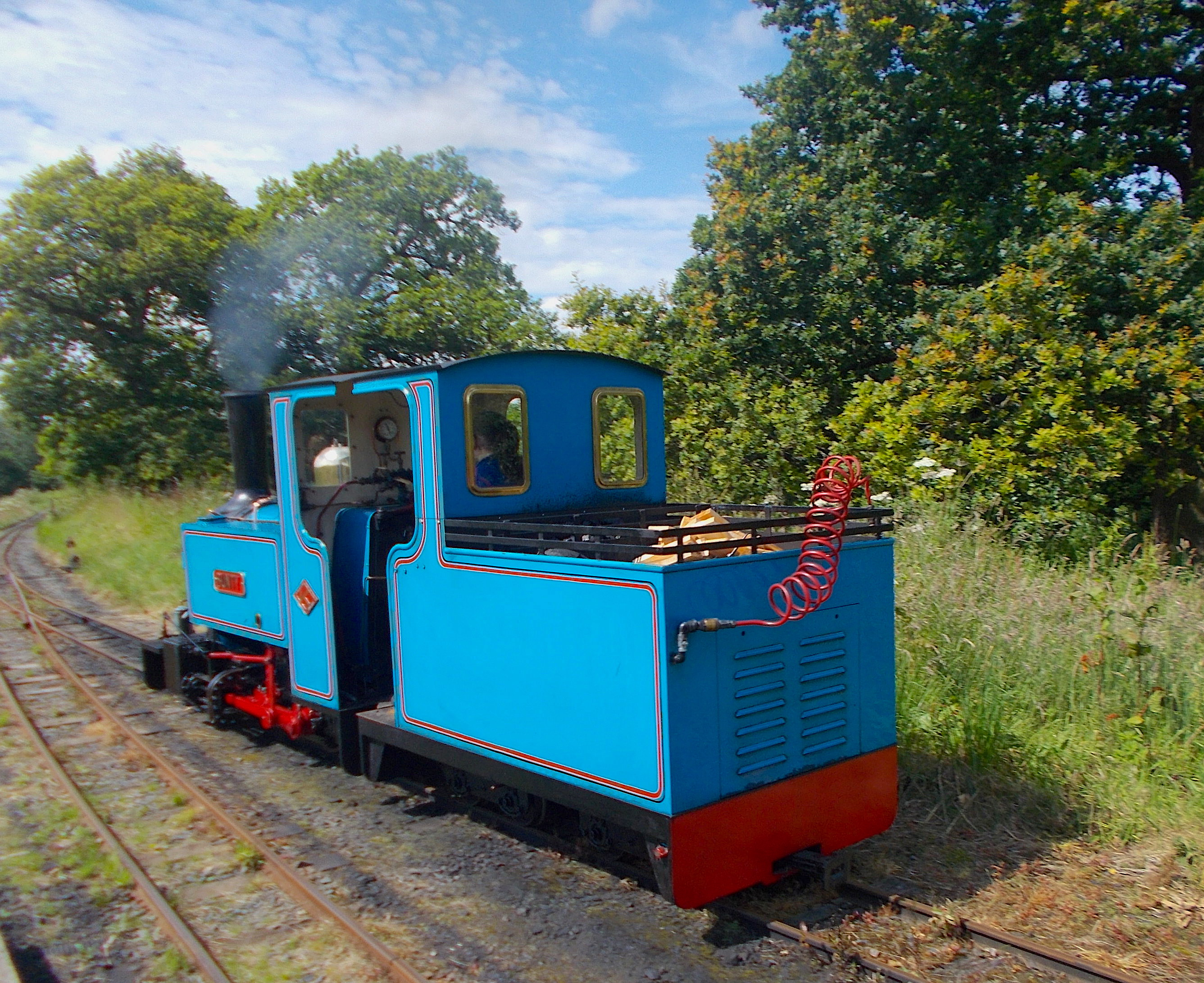
Alan Keef 2-6-0TT "Bunty" runs round the train at Etal Station

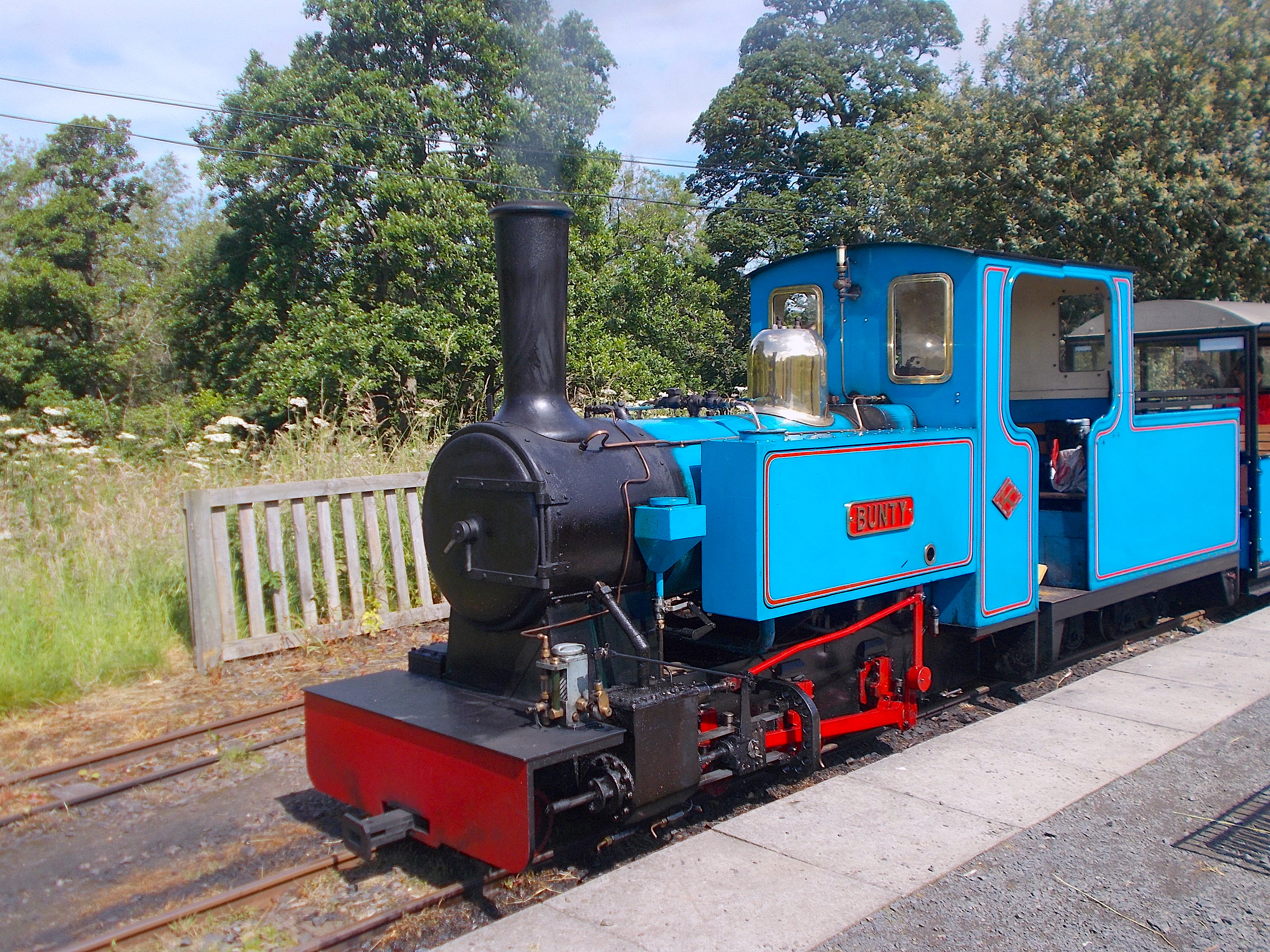
Alan Keef 2-6-0TT "Bunty" at Etal Station
