= Southport Pier =

Pier in Southport, Merseyside, England

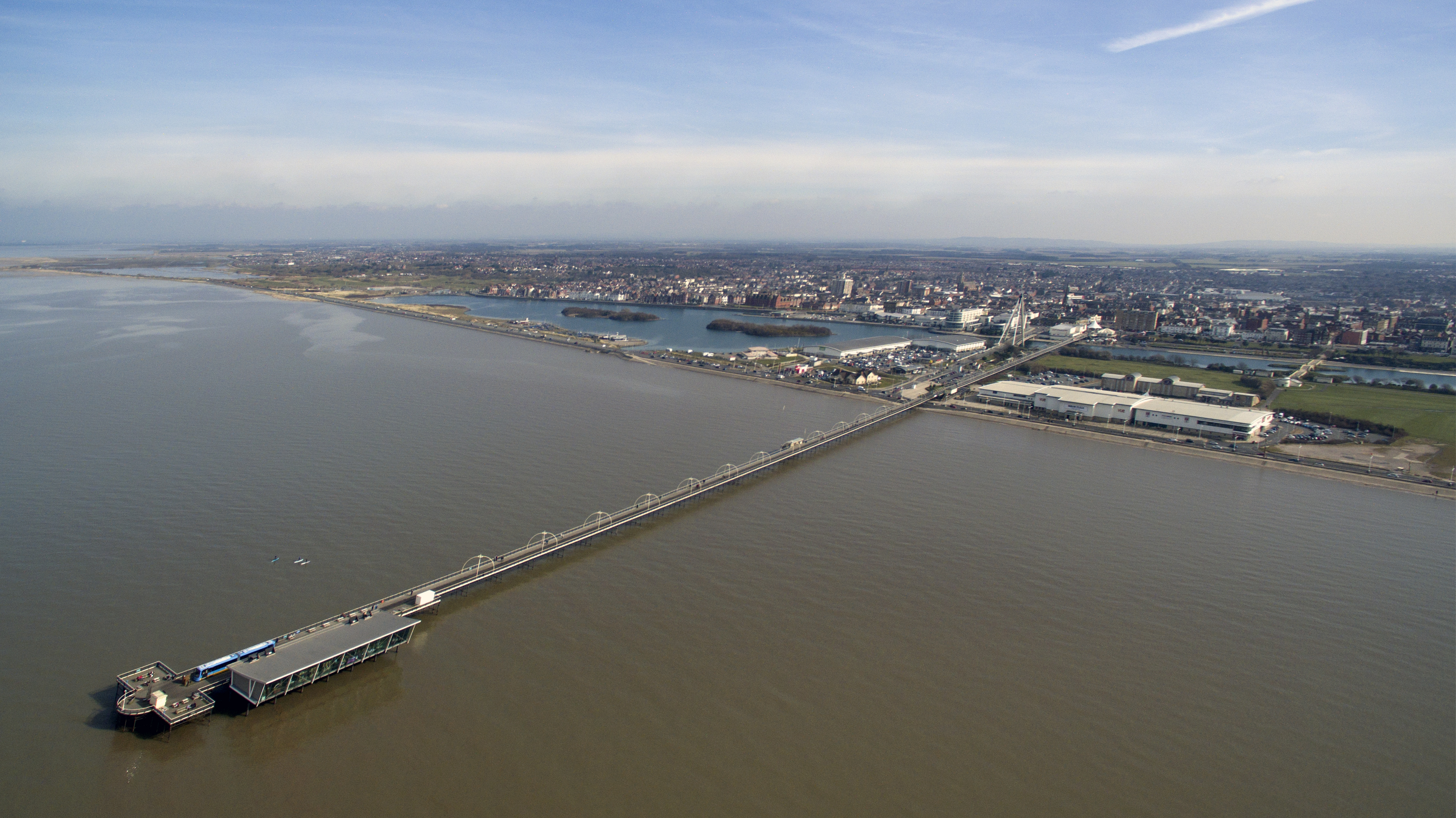
- Southport Pier in 2016
- Type: Pleasure
- Carries: Pedestrians
- Location: Southport
- Coordinates: 53.655°N 3.019°W
- Owner: Sefton Council
- Maintained by: Sefton Council

Characteristics
- Total length: 1,108 m (3,635 ft)

History
- Designer: James Brunlees
- Constructor: W & J Galloway
- Opening date: 2 August 1860; 166 years ago
- Listed: Grade II listed
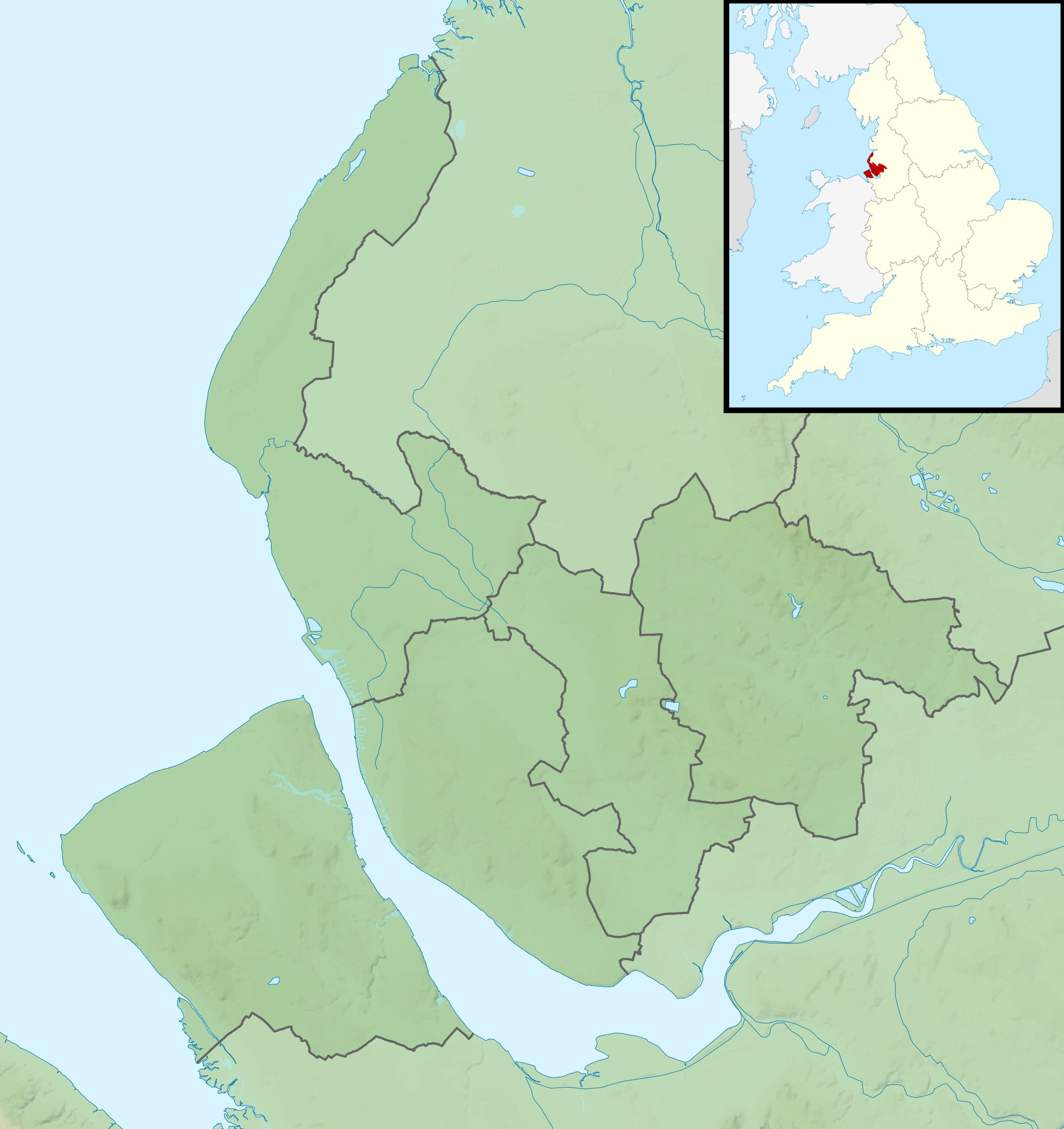
- Location in Southport Location in Merseyside

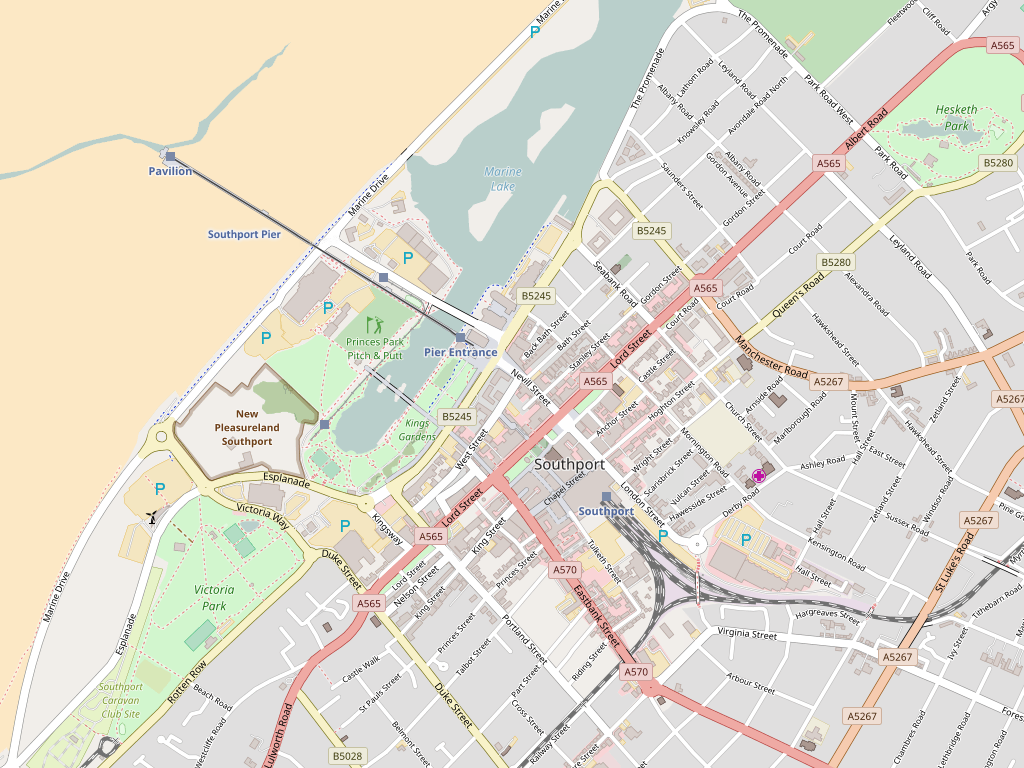
- Southport Pier location within Southport

Southport Pier is a pleasure pier in Southport, Merseyside, England. Opened in August 1860, it is the oldest iron pier in the country. Its length of 1,108 m (3,635 ft) makes it the second-longest in Great Britain, after Southend Pier. Although at one time spanning 1,340 m (4,380 ft), a succession of storms and fires during the late 19th and early 20th centuries reduced its length to that of the present day.

The pier has been host to famous entertainers, including Charlie Chaplin in the early 20th century. It was visited by steamliners in its heyday, but silting of the channel meant that by the 1920s very few steamers were able to reach the pier, and the service ceased in 1929. The pier fell into disrepair throughout the late 20th century, and by 1990 it was operating at a significant annual loss with rising maintenance costs. The local council sought to have the pier demolished, but were defeated in their attempt by a single vote.

The pier was significantly restored during 2000–2002, and opened to the public in May 2002. The Southport Pier Tramway ran from Southport Promenade to the pier head at various times in the pier's history with various rolling stock, most recently until June 2015.

The pier is recorded in the National Heritage List for England as a designated Grade II listed building, first listed on 18 August 1975.

== Location ==
At 1,108 m (3,635 ft), Southport Pier is the second longest in Great Britain. (Note: Southend Pier is the longest in the country, at a length of 2,158 m (7,080 ft)) As a result of silting in the water channel, part of the pier now passes overland before reaching the beach, as the silt has allowed land beneath the pier to be reclaimed. The entrance starts at Promenade Road and follows a route inland next to Princes Park, before crossing over Marine Drive and meeting the beach at approximately half-way along its length.

The area that now houses the marine lake and surrounding road at the land-end of the pier was acquired by the pier corporation in 1885, following population growth in the local area and pier extensions in the 1870s. In the late 1920s the council reclaimed a large area of the beach to build an urban park, consisting of a lake, miniature railway and car parking. The pier is a seven-minute walk from Southport railway station, 480 m (0.3 mi) away.

== History ==
=== 19th century ===
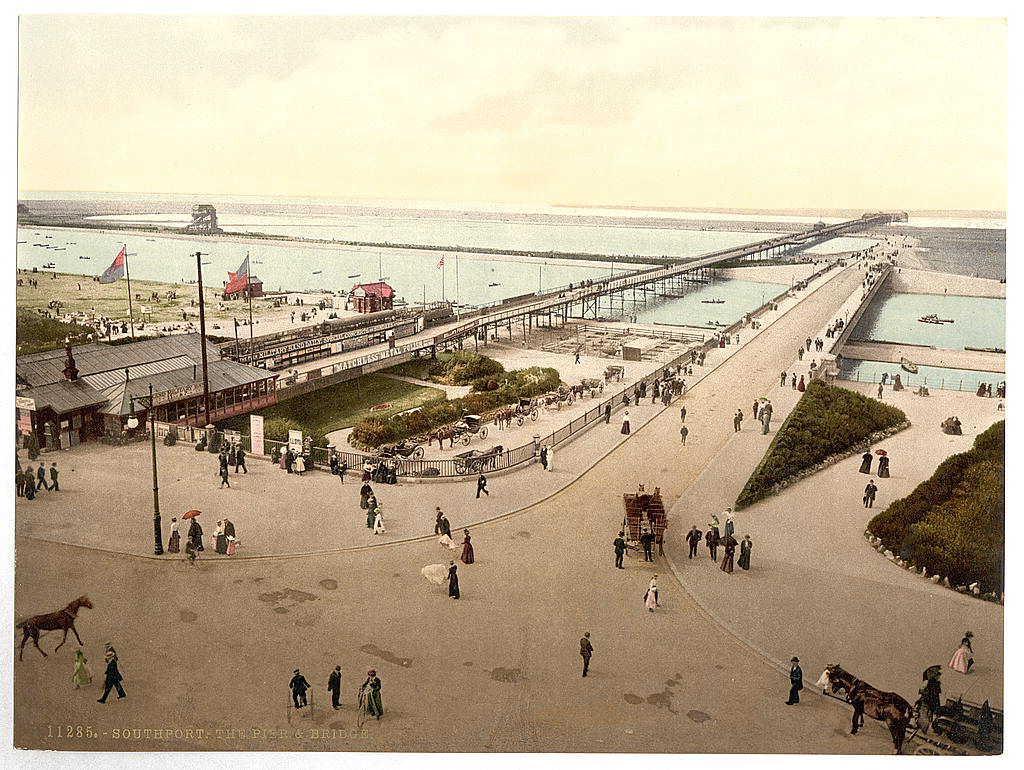
Pier and bridge, c. 1890–1900

Proposals for a pier in Southport were first suggested in 1844, in conjunction with a potential railway from Manchester, with a committee formed in 1852 to help promote its construction. Following debates throughout the following few years about what its intended usage should be, the Southport Pier company was formed in March 1859 with a £12,000 capital. The cost to build the pier was estimated at £8000 (equivalent to £869,052 in 2025), eventually rising to £8700 (equivalent to £945,094 in 2025) with construction work commencing in August 1859. The pier's primary purpose was to be a promenade as opposed to a ship docking pier, and thus is considered to be the country's first pleasure pier.

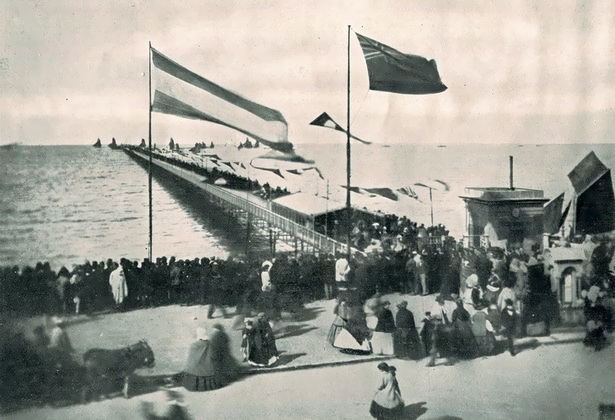
Southport Pier opening ceremony, 1860

A year later, on 2 August 1860, the pier was officially opened with a grand procession; at a length of 1,100 metres (3,600 ft) it was the second-longest and first iron-constructed pleasure pier in the country. Waiting rooms for boat passengers were added during the pier's first few years of operation, and a cable-operated tramway had been installed by 1865. The pier was extended to 1,340 metres (4,380 ft) in 1868 and was used by various steamer ships, including those of the Blackpool, Lytham and Southport Steam Packet Company, with services operating from the pier to resorts including Fleetwood and Llandudno.

Visitors to the pier had to pay a toll, priced deliberately high at 6d (equivalent to £2.75 in 2016) to ensure only the most affluent could afford it. As the 1870s progressed, the numbers of working class visitors increased and tolls were reduced to 2d.

Storm damage was a frequent occurrence – several storms caused damage to the pier's foundations and buildings throughout the late 1880s and early 1890s. A fire in September 1897 destroyed the original pavilion; its replacement was opened in January 1902 and considered grander, with the inclusion of an auditorium.

=== 20th century ===
A popular attraction from 1903 were an array of divers, typically diving from the tea house roof several times daily; the most popular and longest-serving were Professors Osbourne and Powsey, the latter frequently jumping off the pier on a bicycle. From 1906, the newly constructed pavilion was leased out to play host to a variety of entertainers, including Charlie Chaplin and George Robey. Following the First World War, the pavilion was renamed the Casino and its main attraction on offer was dancing. This period was a financial success for the pier, with a net profit of £9155 (equivalent to £913,336 in 2025) in 1913 and an annual average profit of £6750 (equivalent to £354,804 in 2025) during the 1920s.

By the early 1920s, silting in the water channel allowed for land reclamation, whilst it became more and more difficult for steamer ships to reach the pier; the service ceased entirely in 1929. Profits fell during the 1930s depression, compounded with a large fire in July 1933 destroying the pier head. The cost of damage was estimated at £6000 (equivalent to £371,272 in 2025) which was unaffordable to the Southport Pier Company, who ended up selling the pier to Southport Corporation in June 1936 for £34,744 (equivalent to £2,123,039 in 2025).

The pier was closed to the public during the Second World War to house and operate searchlights to detect enemy aircraft travelling to Liverpool docks, yet was not physically separated from the land like other piers were during this time. The pier did not reopen again until 1950 and in June 1959, suffered a significant fire which destroyed 460 square metres (5,000 sq ft) of decking, reducing its length to the present day 3,633 feet (1,107 m) and for a period of time making it the third longest pier after Herne Bay Pier, until that was destroyed by a storm in 1978. Sefton Council acquired ownership of the pier in 1974 following national reorganisation of local government and it was designated as a Grade II listed structure on 18 August 1975 despite being in a state of deterioration. A grant of £62,400 (equivalent to £212,161 in 2025) was awarded in 1983 by the European Regional Development Fund to strengthen the pier's structure.

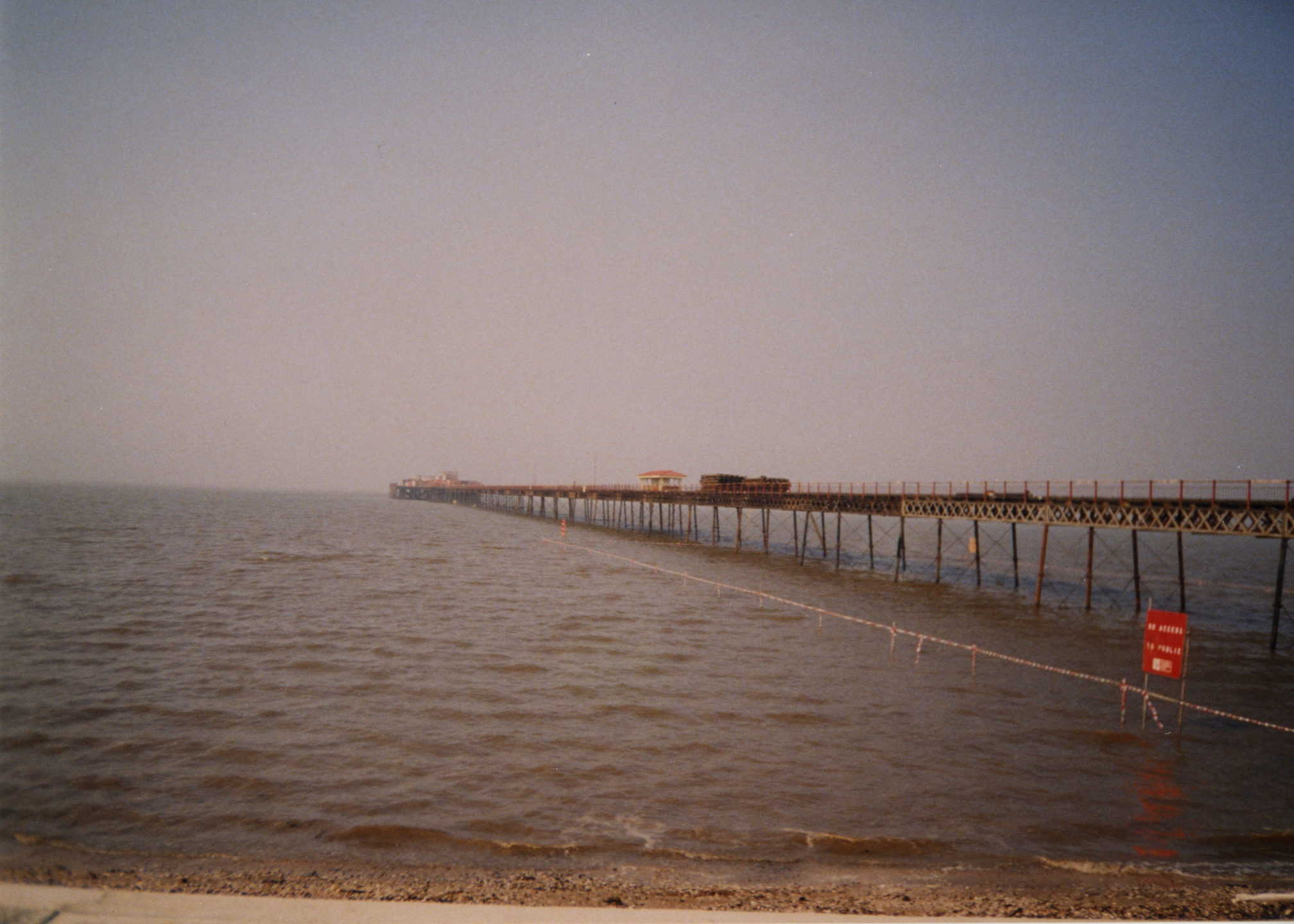
The pier in 2000, shortly before restoration

Deterioration continued during the latter 20th century and worsened by a storm in 1989, causing extensive damage. Despite its listed status, Sefton Council sought to demolish the pier in December 1990 due to the rising cost of repairs and maintenance, yet was defeated by a single vote. Operating at an annual loss of £100,000 and with estimates close to £1 million to secure the future of the pier, plus a further £250,000 required every five years for repainting, a charitable trust was formed in 1993 to upkeep the pier; various funding was secured in the subsequent years to maintain the pier's operation. In February 1997, a grant of £34,000 (equivalent to £67,023 in 2025) was provided from lottery funding in order for a structural survey to be undertaken, confirming the pier's then poor condition and recommending its closure. In October 1998, the pier received a heritage grant of £1.7 million from the Heritage Lottery Fund, awarded to support restoration and access.

=== 21st century ===
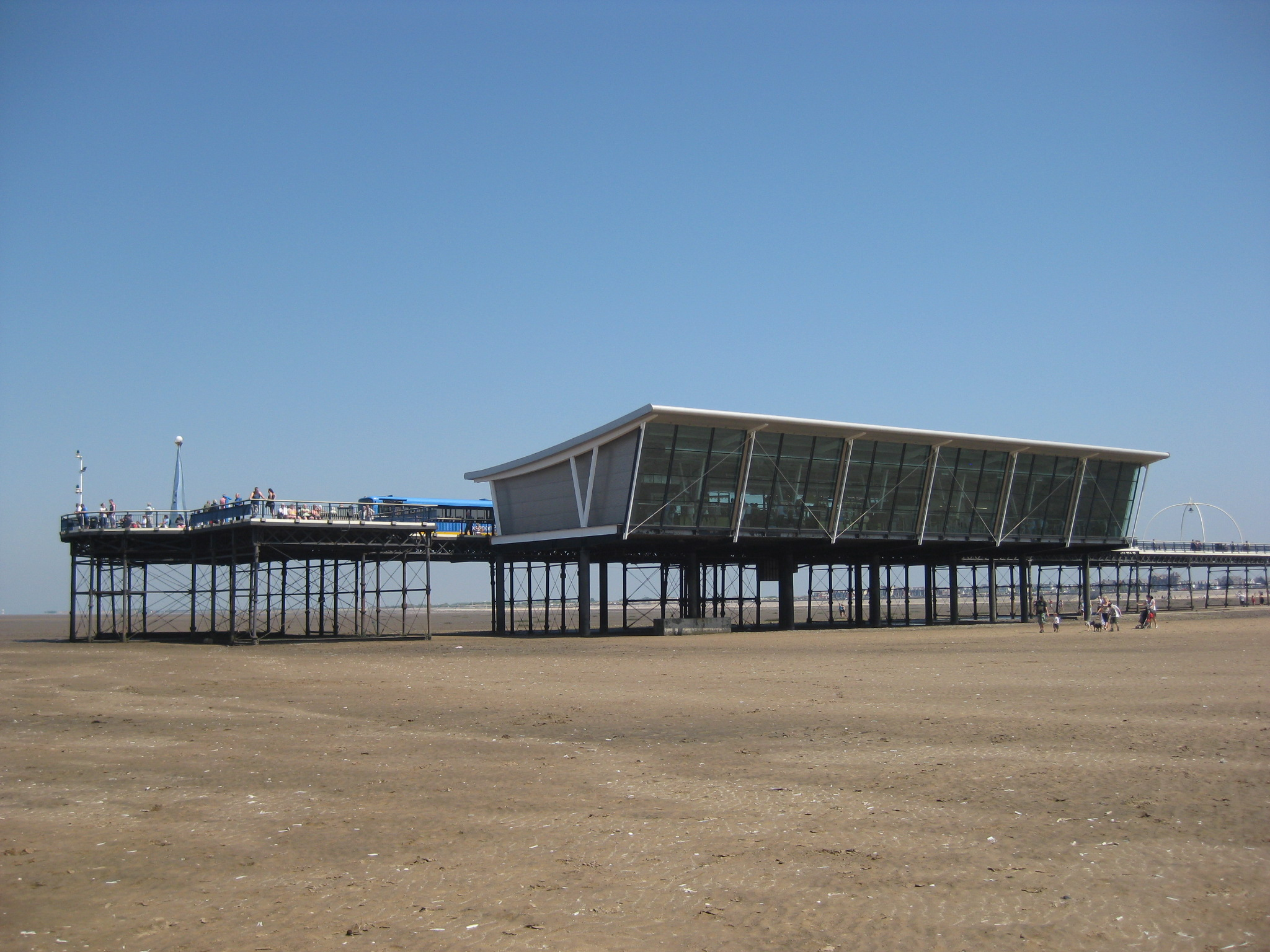
The modern pier pavilion, pictured in 2010

After falling into disrepair and subsequently closing, work to restore the pier began in 2000 and was completed in 2002, opening to the public in May 2002 with the restoration costing £7.2 million, complete with a new tram. Restoration of the pier formed part of a wider redevelopment strategy, including a new sea wall to help prevent flooding, landscaping around the pier and a new £28 million Ocean Plaza shopping complex.

The pier today is an open structure, with modern railings on an older base and a deck made of hardwood slats, affording a partial view of the sea below. Along the walkway are name plaques that local people funded to help towards raising the restoration funds. The modern pavilion structure at the pier head was designed by Liverpool architects Shed KM and cost £1.2 million; the building houses a cafeteria with airport style floor to ceiling windows overlooking the beach and a collection of vintage mechanical amusement machines and penny arcade. The exhibition of Edwardian and Victorian machines operate on pre-decimalisation pennies, available to purchase on-site at £1 for 10 old pennies.

Plans were announced in April 2017 to renovate the pier as part of a £2.9 million makeover, with two-thirds of the cost coming from the Coastal Communities Fund. The project included, structural repairs, repainting, construction of a new kiosk, adding additional seating, mechanical works, as well as pavilion improvements and providing easier access to the pier from the beach.

In December 2022, due to decking that appeared to be rotting and unstable, the whole pier was closed to the public. As of May, 2025, access to the pier remains blocked off, with repair work on hold as Sefton Council attempt to gather funds. On 31 August 2025, the pier was affected by a large fire, detailed in the media on the following day. It was suspected to have been caused by an electrical fault. It also spread to a cafe building on the pier.

== Tramway ==
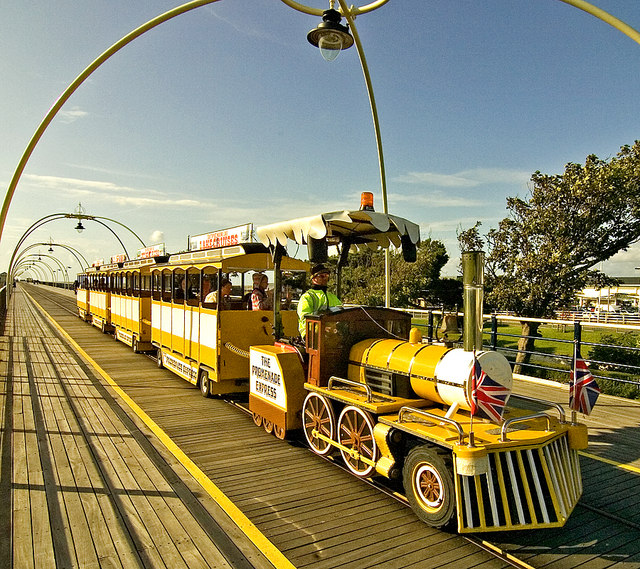
The Promenade Express, pictured in 2009

Initially, the pier had a baggage line from 1863, though this was replaced in 1864 when the pier was widened to provide a steam-driven tramway capable of transporting passengers and their luggage. The line was re-laid in 1893, with electrification coming in April 1905. The rolling stock was rebuilt in 1936 when the line was taken over by Southport Corporation. The pier was closed during the Second World War, but when it reopened the tram did not reopen with it, as the town had lost its supply of DC electricity. The tram line eventually reopened in 1950, with the track gauge changed and moved to the side of the pier (previously central) and from 1954 operated with new diesel trains, known as the Silver Belle and built by local engineer Harry Barlow who owned the Lakeside Miniature Railway. The stock was replaced in 1973 with English Rose, which operated until the mid-1990s, at which time there were doubts over the pier's future. The Silver Belle stock became derelict at Steamport for some years, before moving to the West Lancashire Light Railway for conversion into carriages.

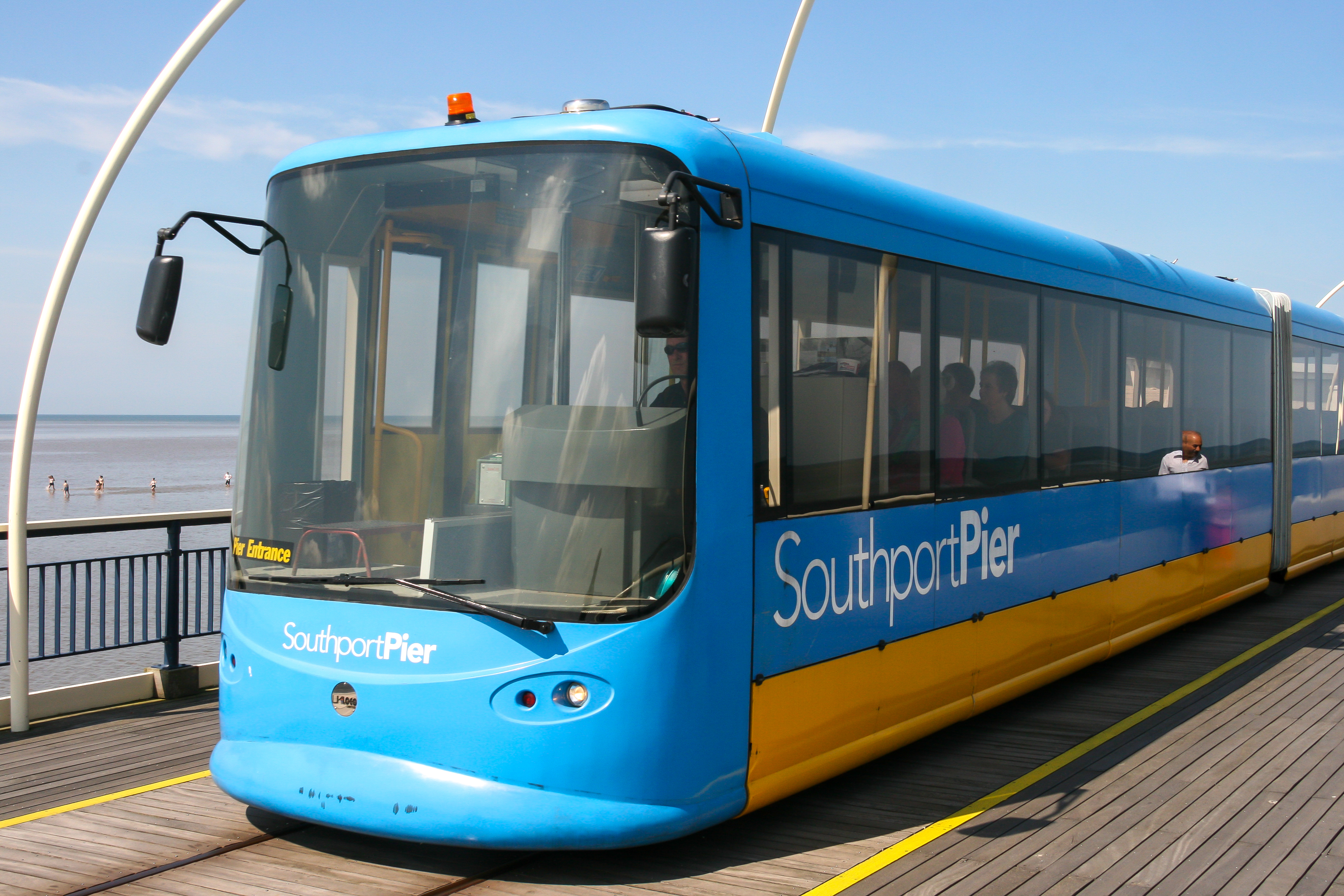
The pier tram in 2011

The restoration in 2002 provided a new 3 ft 6 in (1,067 mm) narrow gauge tram track in the centre of a widened deck and on 1 August 2005, a new twin-section articulated, battery powered tram car started service on this track, with a passenger capacity of 74 people. The tram ran every day of the year except Christmas Day and provided a half-hourly service in both directions.

In July 2013, the tram service was suspended following the discovery of cracks within the supporting columns and ceased running entirely in June 2015 due to rising maintenance costs and council cost-cutting measures. It was replaced by an extension of a pre-existing smaller land train, with the tram removed for sale in March 2016. The rails were removed in 2023 and donated to the West Lancashire Light Railway.

== Cultural references ==
The pier has been featured in films, such as the 1985 film Mr. Love, which was filmed primarily in Southport.

In 2014, a BBC drama titled There To Here filmed some scenes at Southport pier, which takes place in June 1996 in Manchester when an IRA bomb caused significant damage to Manchester's city centre.

In 2021, the pier featured in the closing scene of the BBC drama, Time, which starred Sean Bean and Stephen Graham.

== Awards ==
- 2003 National Piers Society: Pier of the Year

== See also ==
- Southport Corporation Tramways
- List of town tramway systems in England
- List of town tramway systems in the United Kingdom

Awards and achievements
Preceded by Southwold Pier	National Piers Society; Pier of the Year; 2003	Succeeded by North Pier, Blackpool
