= Pindal Electric Tramway =

The Pindal Electric Tramway is a small privately owned tramway operating on 15 in (381 mm) gauge in Oakville, Ontario, Canada.

== History ==
Owned by Canadian animator Kaj Pindal, the tramway opened in 1965 in Montreal, but moved to Oakville in 1980. Essentially a garden railway, the line is unusual for its gauge of 15 in (381 mm), usually associated with more extensive rail networks. The line is powered by overhead electric cables, with the power transmitted to the tramcars via pantograph, which is also highly unusual in the 15 in (381 mm) gauge. Although few private homes are able to accommodate a railway of 15 in (381 mm) gauge, the Pindal Electric Tramway operates, by agreement with the Town of Oakville, partly on Pindal's private property, and partly on land owned by the city.

== Rolling stock ==
The Pindal Electric Tramway operates a fleet of seven electric tramcars, and several passenger trailers, as well as a small number of flatbed and freight trailers.
