= Fifteen-inch–gauge railway =

Railway track gauge (381 mm)

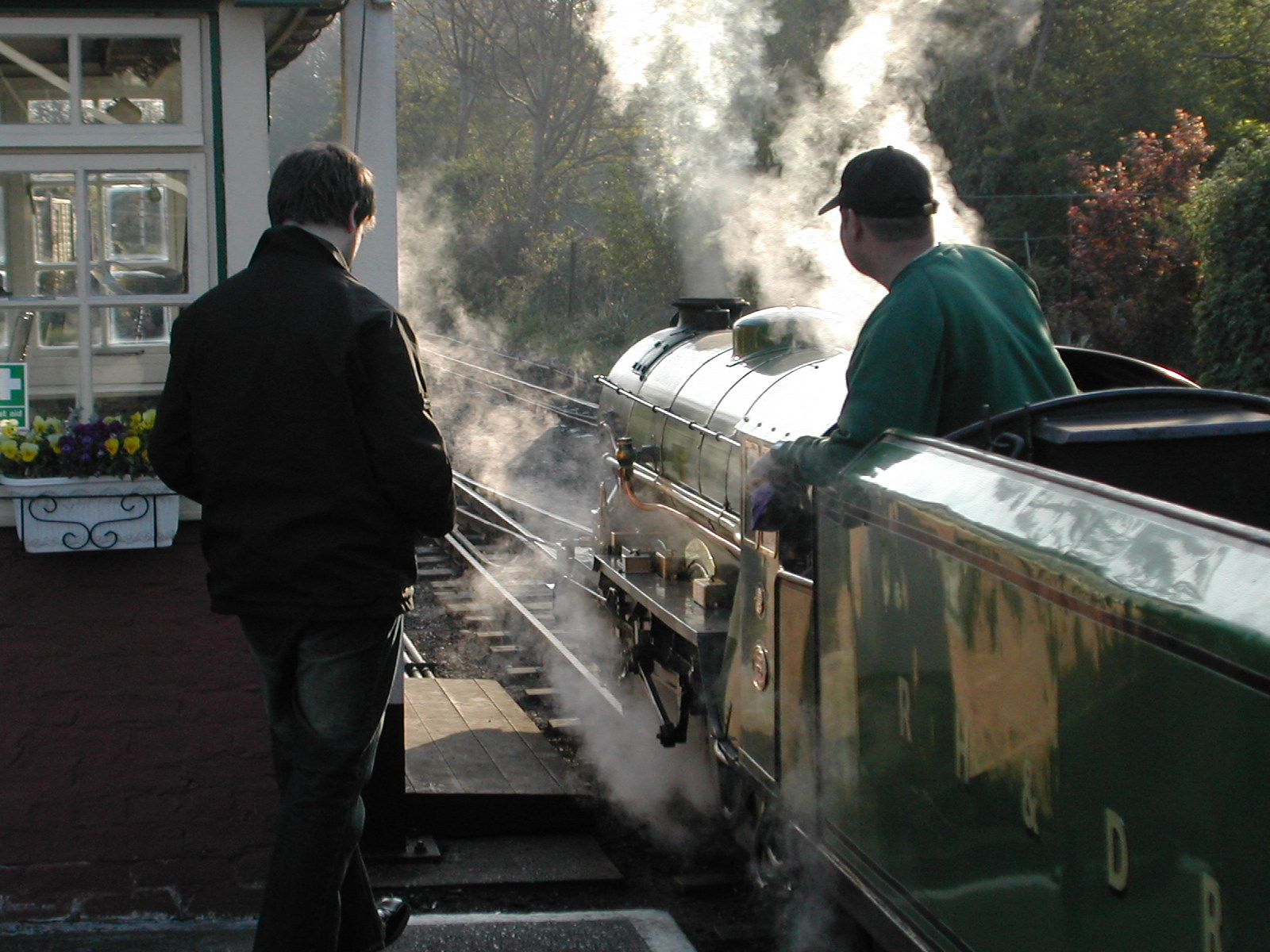
Romney, Hythe and Dymchurch Railway

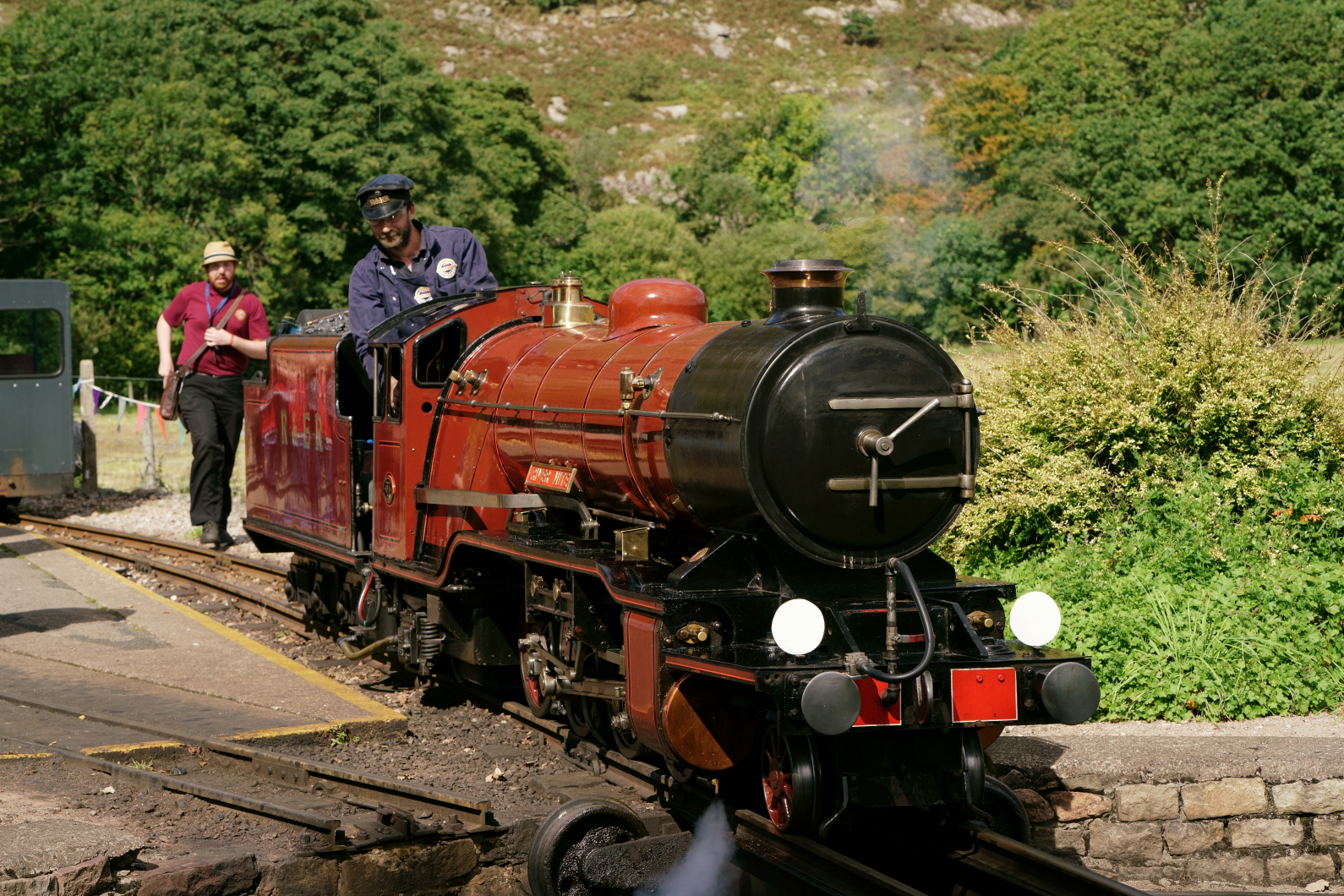
Ravenglass & Eskdale Railway

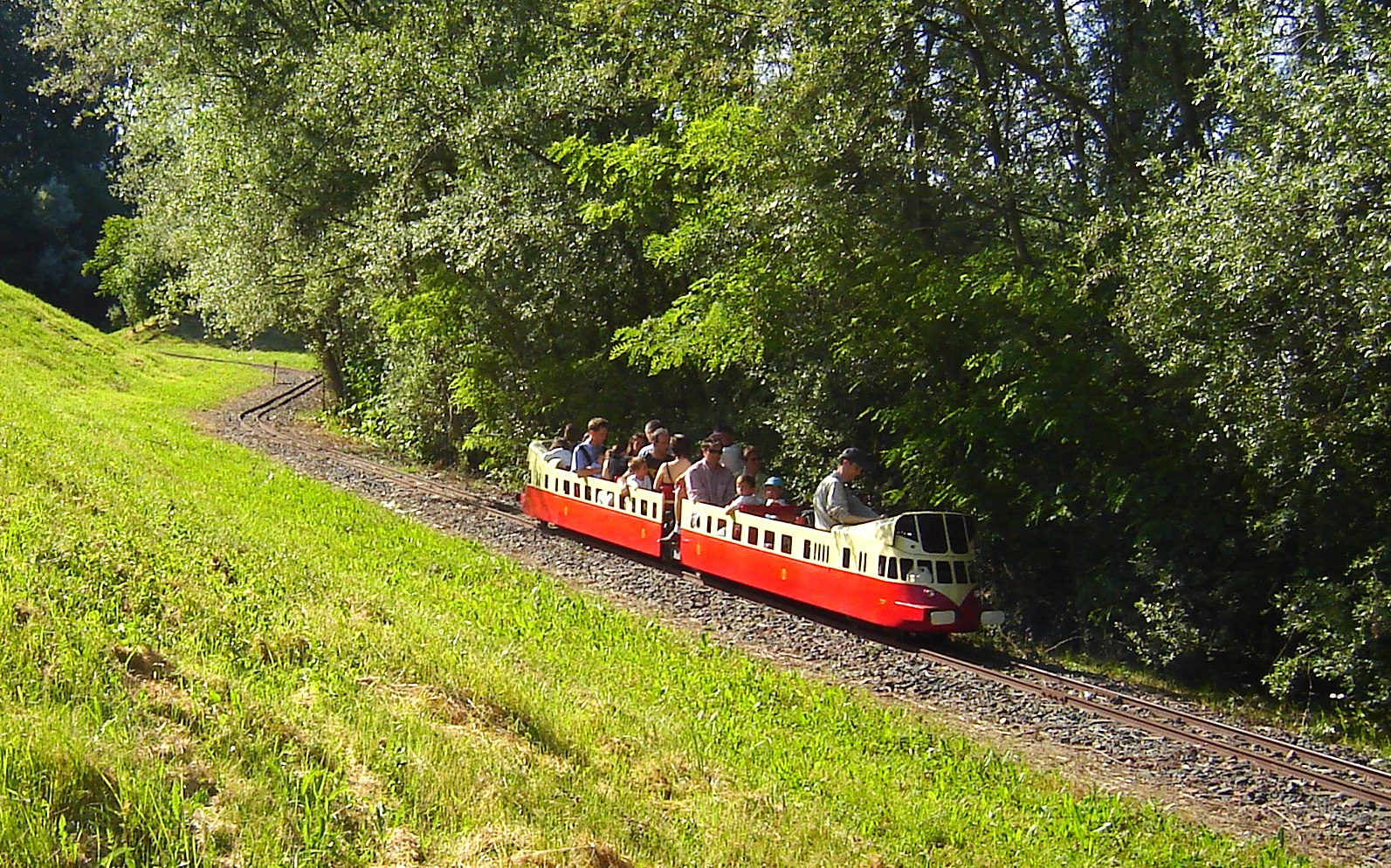
One of the Chemin de fer Touristique d'Anse's X131 when passing through the hills

Fifteen-inch–gauge railways were pioneered by Sir Arthur Percival Heywood, who was interested in what he termed a minimum-gauge railway for use as estate railways or to be easy to lay on, for instance, a battlefield. In 1874, he described the principle behind it as used for his Duffield Bank Railway, distinguishing it from a narrow-gauge railway. Having previously built a small railway of 9 in (229 mm) gauge, he settled on 15 in (381 mm) gauge as the minimum that he felt was practical.

== Railways ==
15-inch–gauge railway installations
Name	Country	Location	Notes
Bush Mill Railway	Australia	Port Arthur	Closed
Little Lynton Railway	Australia	Victoria (?)	Private
Donauparkbahn	Austria	Vienna	
Prater Liliputbahn	Austria	Vienna	
Bear Creek Park Train	Canada	Surrey, British Columbia	
Pindal Electric Tramway	Canada	London, Ontario	Formerly in Montreal
Springbank Express	Canada	London, Ontario	
Model Park Denmark	Denmark	Egå, Aarhus	
Model Park Denmark	Denmark	Brande	
Tivoli lane railway, Tivoli Gardens	Denmark	Copenhagen	The smallest of all: Park Railways. 381 mm (15 inches): This is found, for example, in Tivoli Gardens in Copenhagen (Tivolibanen).
Chemin de fer Touristique d'Anse	France	Anse, Rhône	
Dresden Park Railway	Germany	Dresden	
Killesberg Park Railway	Germany	Stuttgart	
Leipziger Parkeisenbahn	Germany	Leipzig	
Difflin Lake Railway	(Republic of Ireland) Ireland		
Cygnus wood-land Railway	Japan	Osaka	
Sakuradani Light Railway	Japan	Toyono District of Osaka Prefecture	
Shuzenji Romney Railway	Japan	Niji-no-Sato (Rainbow Park) in Izu, Shizuoka	
Driving Creek Railway	New Zealand		
Whangaparaoa Narrow Gauge Railway	New Zealand		Closed
Adventure Railway	(United Kingdom) UK	Alton Towers	Defunct, 1982–1992 – park still operating
Bellevue Park Railway	(United Kingdom) UK	Belfast, Northern Ireland	Closed 1950
Blackpool Zoo miniature railway	(United Kingdom) UK	Lancashire	
Blakesley Miniature Railway	UK	Blakesley Hall, Northamptonshire	Opened 1903, closed c.1944
Blenheim Park Railway	(United Kingdom) UK	Oxfordshire	
Brocklands Adventure Park	(United Kingdom) UK	Cornwall	Closed 2007
Bure Valley Railway	(United Kingdom) UK	Norfolk	Standard-gauge line closed 1982. 15-inch–gauge line opened 1990.
Cleethorpes Coast Light Railway	(United Kingdom) UK	Lincolnshire	
Conwy Valley Railway Museum	(United Kingdom) UK	Betws-y-Coed, North Wales	Short tramway
Craigtoun Miniature Railway	(United Kingdom) UK	Craigtoun Park, St. Andrews	
Duffield Bank Railway	(United Kingdom) UK		Closed 1916
Eaton Hall Railway	(United Kingdom) UK		Closed 1946
Evesham Vale Light Railway	(United Kingdom) UK	Evesham Country Park, Twyford, Worcestershire	
Fairbourne Railway	(United Kingdom) UK	Wales	Now converted to 12 1/4 in or 311 mm gauge
Far Tottering and Oyster Creek Branch Railway	(United Kingdom) UK	Battersea Park, London	Closed 1975
Gulliver's Land	(United Kingdom) UK	Milton Keynes	
Gulliver's World	(United Kingdom) UK	Warrington, Cheshire	
Haigh Hall Miniature Railway	(United Kingdom) UK	Greater Manchester	
Heatherslaw Light Railway	(United Kingdom) UK	Northumberland	
International Garden Festival Railway	(United Kingdom) UK		1984
Whistlestop Valley (Formerly Kirklees Light Railway)	(United Kingdom) UK	Clayton West, Huddersfield, West Yorkshire	
Knowsley Safari Park (The Lakeside Railway)	(United Kingdom) UK	Prescot, Merseyside	
Lakeside Miniature Railway	(United Kingdom) UK	Southport, Merseyside	
Lappa Valley Steam Railway	(United Kingdom) UK	Cornwall	
Lightwater Express Rio Grande	(United Kingdom) UK	Ripon, North Yorkshire	Theme park
Longleat Railway	(United Kingdom) UK		
Markeaton Park Light Railway	(United Kingdom) UK	Derby	Closed September 2016
Marwell Zoo	(United Kingdom) UK	Colden Common, Hampshire	Closed 2022
Oakwood Theme Park	(United Kingdom) UK	Narberth, Pembrokeshire	
Paradise Park	(United Kingdom) UK	Hayle, Cornwall	
Paultons Park	(United Kingdom) UK	Ower, Romsey, Hampshire	
Perrygrove Railway	(United Kingdom) UK	Gloucestershire	
Ravenglass & Eskdale Railway	(United Kingdom) UK	Cumbria	
Rhiw Valley Light Railway	(United Kingdom) UK	Manafon, Powys, Wales	Closed 2022
Rhyl Miniature Railway	(United Kingdom) UK	Clwyd, Wales	
Romney, Hythe and Dymchurch Railway	(United Kingdom) UK	Kent	
Saltburn Miniature Railway	(United Kingdom) UK	Cat Nab, Cleveland	
Sand Hutton Miniature Railway	(United Kingdom) UK	Yorkshire	Closed 1922
Sherwood Forest Railway	(United Kingdom) UK	Nottinghamshire	
Waveney Valley Railway	(United Kingdom) UK	Bressingham Steam and Gardens Norfolk	
West Midlands Safari Park	(United Kingdom) UK	Worcestershire	Closed 2014
Windmill Farm Railway	(United Kingdom) UK	Burscough, Lancashire	
Wildlife Park Cricket St Thomas	(United Kingdom) UK	Chard, Somerset	
Wotton Light Railway	(United Kingdom) UK	Wotton Underwood, Buckinghamshire	
American Heritage Railroad	(United States) US	Illinois	
Amusement Rides	(United States) US	City Park, Iowa City	
B.A.D. Great Northern Railroad	(United States) US	California	
Eden Springs Park Railroad)	(United States) US	Benton Harbor, Michigan	
Gage Park Railroad	(United States) US	Gage Park, Topeka, Kansas	
Glenwood, South Park & Pacific Railroad	(United States) US	California	
Hillcrest & Wahtoke Steam Railroad	(United States) US	Reedley, California	
Joshua Tree & Southern GSD	(United States) US	California	
Kansas City Northern Miniature Railroad	(United States) US	Kansas City, Missouri	
Laurel Run Railroad	(United States) US	Pennsylvania	
Little Toot Railroad	(United States) US	Rough and Tumble Engineers Historical Association, Pennsylvania	
Look Park	(United States) US	Northampton, Massachusetts	
Miniature Railway at Silver Lake, Ohio	(United States) US	Silver Lake, Ohio	Defunct
Miniature Train at Monarch Park	(United States) US	Oil City, Pennsylvania	Defunct
Nickel Plate Railroad	(United States) US	California	
Northwest Ohio Railroad Preservation	(United States) US	Ohio	
Orland, Newville and Pacific Railroad	(United States) US	California	Operating
Paradise & Pacific Railroad	(United States) US	McCormick-Stillman Railroad Park, Scottsdale, Arizona	Separate 7 1/2 in or 190.5 mm railway named Scottsdale Live Steamers also present. Operating.
Phoenix & Holly Railroad	(United States) US	Oregon	
Pint-Sized Pufferbelly	(United States) US	Strasburg Rail Road, Strasburg Township, Pennsylvania	Operating
Redwood Valley Railway	(United States) US	Tilden Regional Park, California	Operating
Riverside and Great Northern Railway	(United States) US	Wisconsin	
Riverview & Twin Lakes Railroad	(United States) US	Wyoming	
Safari Train	(United States) US	Milwaukee County Zoo, Milwaukee, Wisconsin	Operating
Sioux City Railroad Museum	(United States) US	Iowa	
Sonoma TrainTown Railroad	(United States) US	California	Operating
Sullivan Railroad	(United States) US	Horseheads, New York	
Sutton Miniature Railway, now Tyseley Miniature Railway Project	(United Kingdom) UK	Sutton Coldfield, Cleethorpes, Tyseley	Shut down in 1962 and stored. Moved to Cleethorpes in 2002. Moved to Tyseley in 2020, under restoration since 2024
Tiny Town Railroad	(United States) US	Colorado	
Waterman & Western Railroad	(United States) US	Illinois	

== See also ==
- Bassett-Lowke
- British narrow-gauge railways
- Heritage railway
- List of British heritage and private railways
- List of track gauges
- Minimum-gauge railway
