= Rhyl Miniature Railway =

Miniature railway in Denbighshire, Wales

Coordinates: 53.3138°N 3.5033°W

Rhyl Miniature Railway Rheilffordd Fach y Rhyl
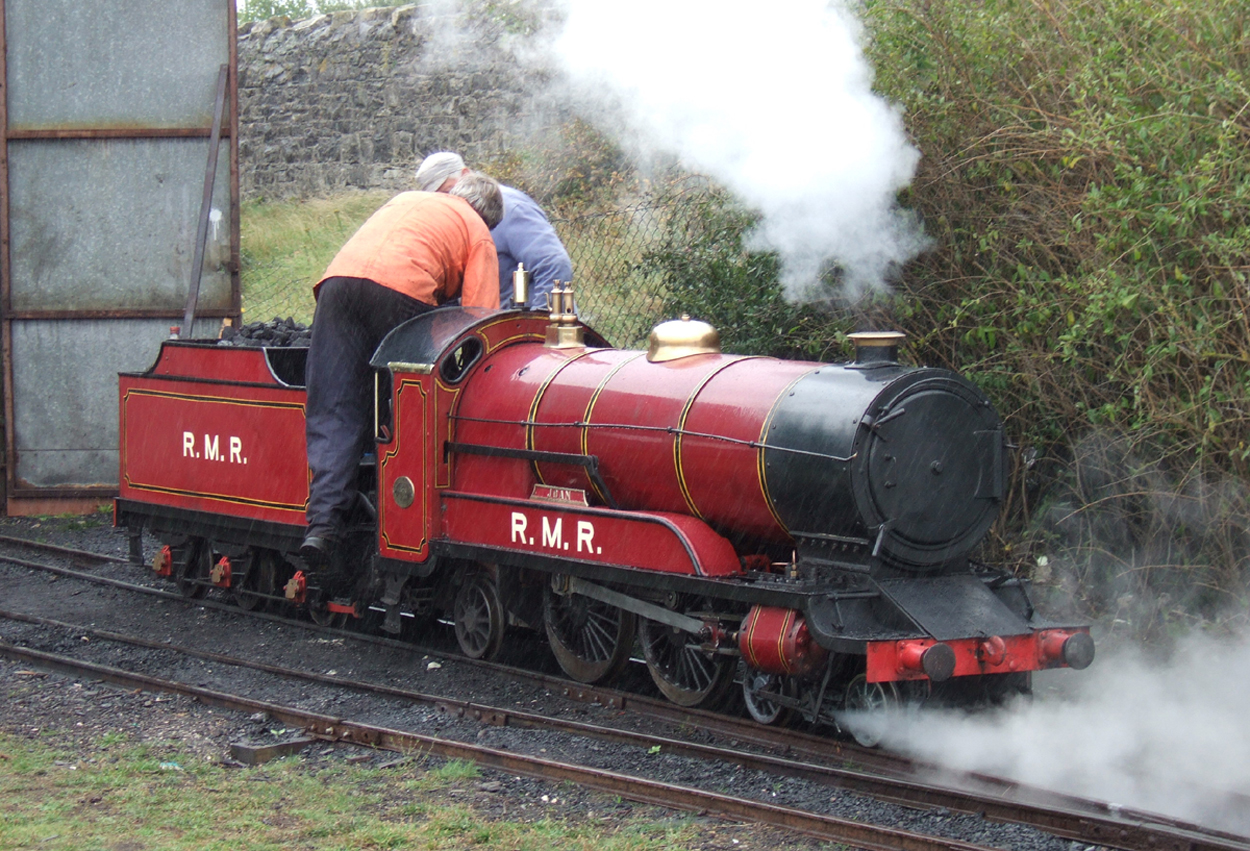
- Joan is one of the original Rhyl Engines

Overview
- Headquarters: Rhyl
- Locale: Denbighshire, Wales
- Dates of operation: 1 May 1911–

Technical
- Track gauge: 15 in (381 mm)
- Length: 1 mile (1.6 km)

Other
- Website: www.rhylminiaturerailway.co.uk

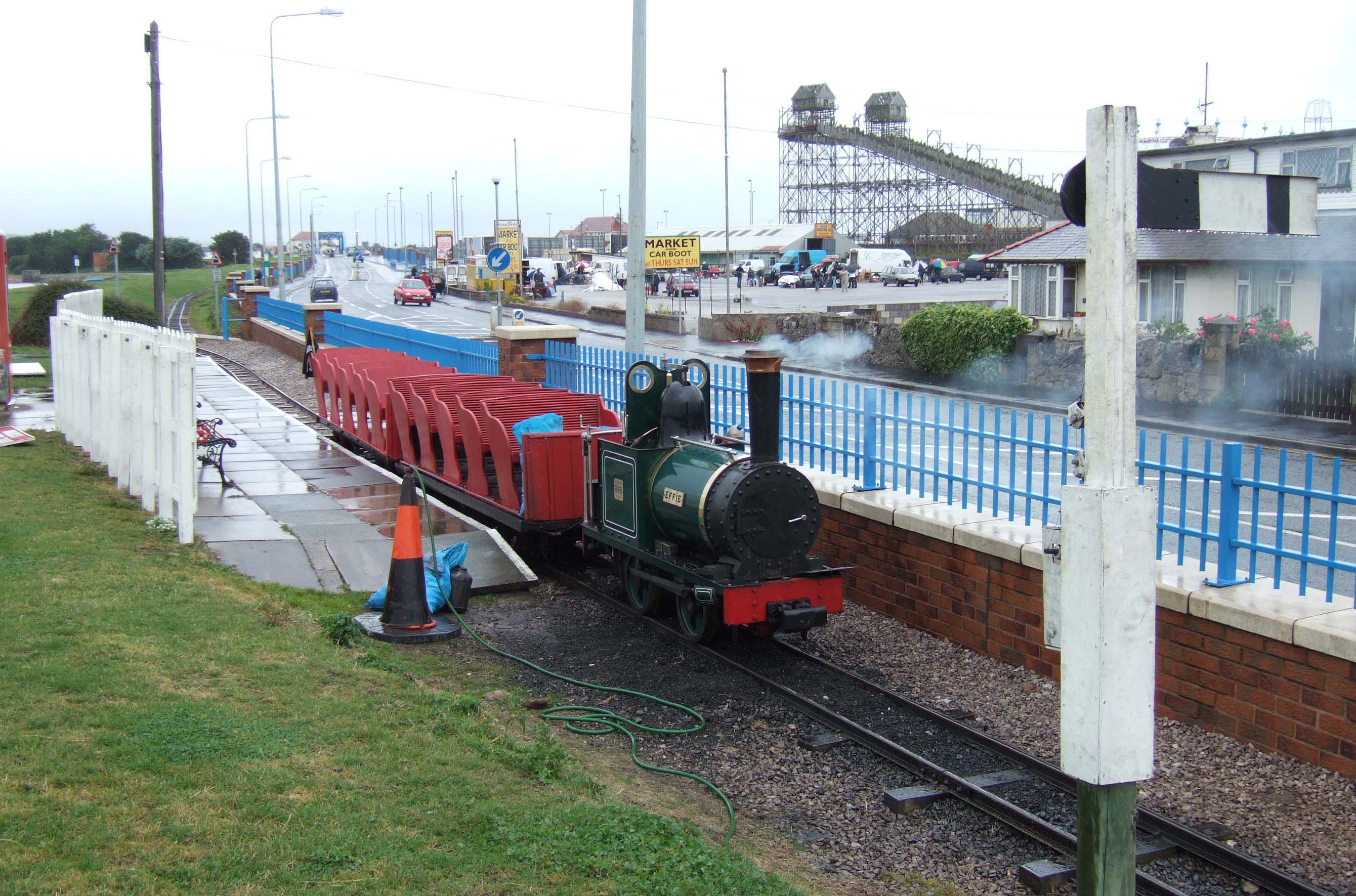
Visiting engine Effie is a replica of a Heywood Engine.

The Rhyl Miniature Railway (Welsh: Rheilffordd Fach y Rhyl) is a 15 in (381 mm) gauge miniature railway line located in Rhyl on the North Wales Coast. The line runs in a circle around a boating lake near the promenade, to the west of the town centre. The railway is operated by Rhyl Steam Preservation Trust, a Registered charity.

== History ==
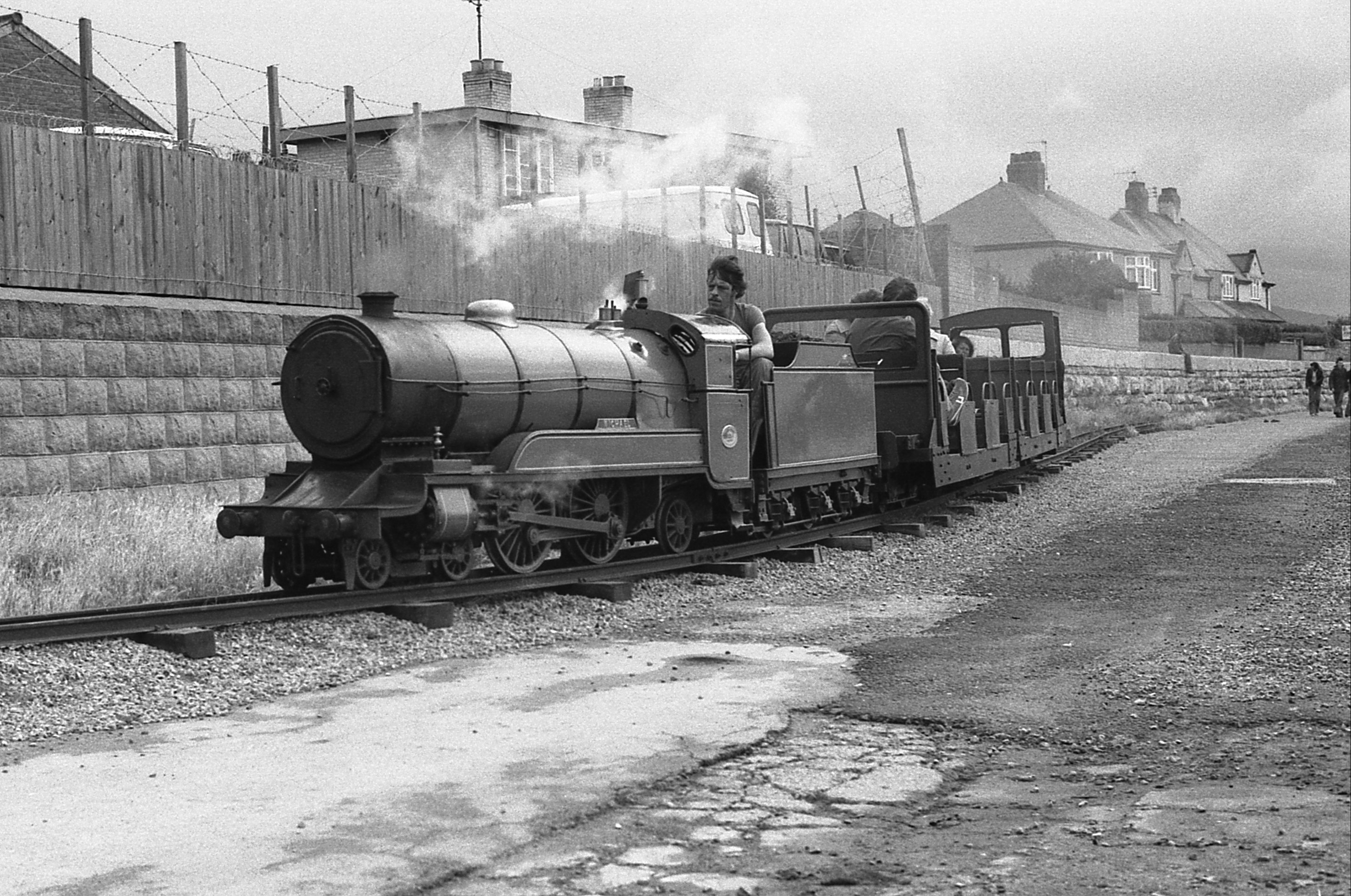
"Michael" with a short train in 1978.

Work on the railway began in December 1910 when it was surveyed by Henry Greenly, to whom permission was given to start work in March 1911, and the railway opened to the public on 1 May 1911. The railway proved to be a great success in its first year. The railway was originally operated using a single Bassett-Lowke Class 10 Atlantic and 6 Bassett-Lowke carriages. In 1913 it was decided to buy a second Class 10 and the "cars de luxe" were built in the company's workshop. In 1920 the decision was taken to replace the two Class 10 with something more powerful due to them being stretched to their limits during peak season. The resulting engine was the first of the "Albion" locomotives.

It all came to an end in 1969. Rhyl Amusements was by then a subsidiary of Trust House Forte Leisure Ltd, whereas the Marine Lake itself belongs to the Borough Council. Trust House would not invest further in the Marine Lake site without a very long lease being granted, which the Council refused. As a result, Trust House decided to concentrate all its resources at Ocean Beach, and handed back the Marine Lake to the Council in 1970, completely bare.

The trackbed then lay bare until 1978 when it was relaid. The railway then started running trains on 1 July 1978.

The new central station building was opened in May 2007. The central station incorporates the Albert Barnes Room which displays the steam locomotive "Billie".

== Locomotives ==
Name	Number	Type	Built By	Date	Description
Joan	101	4-4-2	Albert Barnes & Co	1920	Designed by Henry Greenly this was the first of six locomotives of this type built
Railway Queen	102	4-4-2	Albert Barnes & Co	1921	This locomotive worked at the Woodland Park Miniature Railway; a short-lived line beside the shore of the Isle of Grain, and was originally named Michael (not to be confused with 105)
Michael	105	4-4-2	Albert Barnes & Co	c1925	Now in full working order
Billy	106	4-4-2	Albert Barnes & Co	c1930	Static exhibit in the Albert Barnes Room on site
Cagney44	44	4-4-0	Cagney Brothers New York	c1910	One of a few working examples in the UK. She was brought to the UK in 1999 disassembled and rebuilt from there.
Clara		0-4-2DH	Guest & Saunders Light Engineering	1961	This steam outline diesel was built for services on the Dudley zoo railway and brought to Rhyl in 1978. Now rebuilt with hydraulic transmission which was finished in winter 2011.
		2W-2-4BER	Hayne/Minirail	1958	This rail car was converted to battery power in 1983 from a normal coach
	10498	4wDM	Lister	1938	This locomotive was converted from 2 ft gauge to 15 and brought to Rhyl in 1999
Prince Edward of Wales		4-4-2	No.15	1909	RMR's first locomotive was almost scrapped. The key components were rescued. It has now returned following restoration. For a brief time it was Red Dragon at Windmill Farm Railway.
