= Saltburn Miniature Railway =

Railway in North Yorkshire, England

Coordinates: 54.582571°N 0.968728°W

Overview
- Locale: England

History
- Opened: 1947

Technical
- Line length: 1/2 mile (0.8 km)
- Track gauge: 15 in (381 mm)

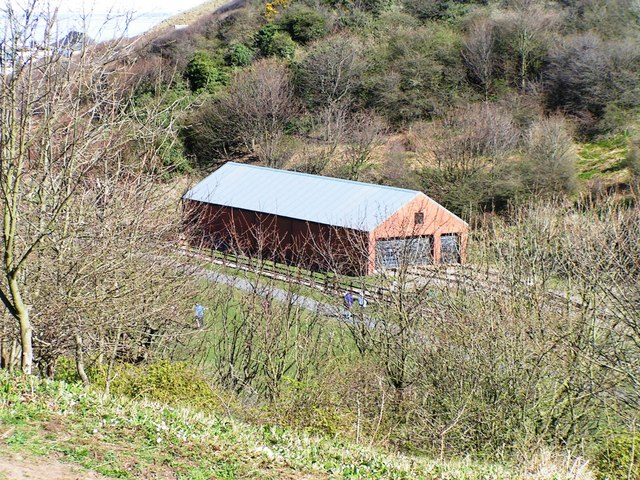
Engine shed on the Saltburn Miniature Railway

The Saltburn Miniature Railway is a 15 in (381 mm) gauge railway at Saltburn, in Redcar and Cleveland, North Yorkshire, England.

== History ==
The railway opened in 1947 as a tourist attraction. It was originally a simple out-and-back line with a station at each end. During 1953, the line was adapted to allow the simultaneous operation of two trains, though without the provision of a passing loop. Instead, a single siding was provided into which one train had to reverse to allow the other to pass by.

During the 1980s the operation of the railway was taken over by an Association of supporters, all of whom are volunteers. A decision was made to extend the railway, relocate one terminus from the west to the east side of the Skelton Beck valley, and provide new sidings and engine sheds. This major project, known on the railway as 'The Big Transformation' took place between September 2000 and April 2003.

== Route ==
The line runs south from Cat Nab Station (by the beach) for about 1/2 mile (0.8 km) inland to Forest Halt, where there is a woodland walk and gardens. There is a run around loop at each end of the line and an engine and rolling stock depot near the midpoint.

== Locomotives ==
Prince Charles was the only serviceable mainline locomotive on the railway, and had been the principal engine continuously since 1953. However, the new operators have provided a lightweight engine for works trains, and have also obtained a new mainline engine, "Saltburn 150", bought from the Cleethorpes Coast Light Railway as derelict has been rebuilt by SMRA and is now in service. A part-built steam engine, a 4-4-2 Atlantic type, has been purchased and rebuilt by SMRA and is now in service as "Blacklock R" .

Locomotive Name or Number	Locomotive Type	Year of Building	Year of Arrival at Saltburn	Builder	In service?	Notes
Former Locomotives
No 7	2-4-0PM	circa 1930	1947	Parkinson	No – withdrawn 1948	Steam outline. Operated the first season, but only that season.
Blacovesley, but renamed Elizabeth	4-4-4D	1909	1948	Bassett Lowke	No – withdrawn c 1960	Steam outline. Previously operated at Blakesley Hall Railway. Now restored to original condition and has revisited the SMR.
Current Locomotives
Prince Charles	4-6-2DE	1953	1953	H N Barlow	Yes	Steam outline (streamlined), painted apple green, principal engine.
George Outhwaite	0-4-0DH	1994	1994	SMR Assoc	Yes	Steam outline, painted red, shunting & works engine. Occasionally used on passenger services.
Saltburn 150	4-6-2DH	1972	2006	Artisair, rebuilt SMRA 2011	Yes	Steam outline, painted blue.
Blacklock R	4-4-2	1992	2013	Rebuilt by SMRA 2015	Yes	Live steam, painted black and red.

== Other rolling stock ==
The passengers carried in the first season (1947) were obliged to sit in freight wagons – scale model 7-plank open wagons, with crude cross-bar seats fitted. However, for the 1948 season the railway acquired two bogie passenger coaches with reversible seats whose backs could be tipped to allow the passenger to face the direction of travel. In 1953 the railway took delivery of four new passenger coaches, each seating 16 passengers (in 4 compartments of 4 seats each); at a subsequent, but unknown, date the two earlier coaches were withdrawn. When the current operators took over the line they made temporary use of the last two serviceable coaches of 1953 vintage, though these have since been withdrawn. There are now four passenger coaches, all of modern build and metal construction. Three are enclosed, and one is open. Three of these coaches have exterior platforms for a guard or guards to travel upon.

The 1948 coaches operated with a replica brake van, since withdrawn. Today the railway has three works wagons – a general works truck, a tanker truck, and an air compressor wagon.
