= Hillview =

Hillview or Hill View may refer to:

== Places ==
=== Australia ===
- Hillview, Sutton Forest, New South Wales
- Hillview, Queensland

=== Canada ===
- Hillview, Edmonton, Alberta
- Hillview, Newfoundland and Labrador
- Hillview, Ontario

=== Ireland ===
- Hillview, Waterford

=== Malaysia ===
- Taman Hillview, Selangor

=== Singapore ===
- Hillview, Singapore

=== United Kingdom ===
- Hill View, Bournemouth, England

=== United States ===
- Hillview, Illinois
- Hillview, Kentucky
- The Hillview, a historical building in Hollywood, California

== Education ==
- Hill View Academy, in Almondbury, West Yorkshire, England
- Hillview College in Tunapuna, Trinidad and Tobago
- Hillview High School in Pretoria, South Africa
- Hillview High School (Orange County, California), United States
- Hillview School for Girls in Tonbridge, Kent, United Kingdom

== Other uses ==
- Cluff Apartments, also known as Hillview Apartments, in Salt Lake City, Utah
- The Hillview, a historic building in Hollywood, California
- Hillview Reservoir, a reservoir in Yonkers, New York
