= Alan Keef Ltd =

British narrow gauge railway engineering company

- Type: Rolling stock & Locomotive manufacturer
- Industry: Railways
- Founded: 1972; 54 years ago
- Founder: Alan Keef

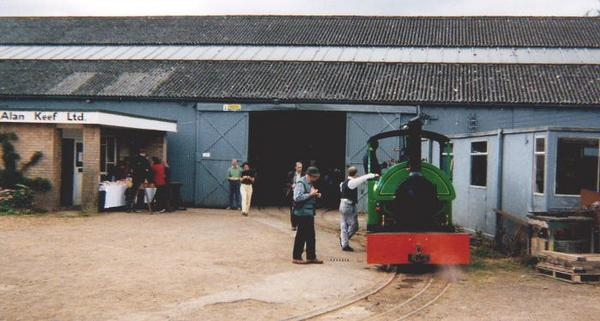
The Alan Keef Ltd works at Lea, Herefordshire; locomotive Woto at an open day

Alan Keef Ltd is a British narrow gauge railway engineering company which manufactures, overhauls, and deals in narrow gauge locomotives, rolling stock and associated equipment.

== History ==
The limited company was formed in 1975 at Cote, Bampton, Oxfordshire, continuing what Alan Keef had already been doing for some years as an individual. The first new locomotive was built in 1976.

In 1986 the company moved to larger premises at Lea, near Ross-on-Wye in Herefordshire. In 1987 it took over the production of Motor Rail locomotives.

== Production ==
As of 2008, the company had built more than eighty locomotives – steam, diesel and electric. Most have been miniature or narrow gauge except for two standard gauge steam locomotives for Beamish Museum: the replicas of "Steam Elephant" and "Puffing Billy". In 2008 the company built the frames, running gear and mechanical parts for two Parry People Mover railcars for use on the Stourbridge Town branch (139001 and 139002). A number of Alan Keef's locomotives are replicas of steam locomotives but with diesel power. These are referred to as steam outline (s/o) in the listing below.

In addition to the replicas for Beamish, the company has also helped restore a number of historically significant engines including both UK preserved Baldwin Class 10-12-D locomotives – No. 778 – which now works at Leighton Buzzard Light Railway and more recently No 794 (referred to as No 590) from the Welsh Highland Heritage Railway. However, this project was eventually paused and the WHHR moved the locomotive to the Vale of Rheidol's Aberystwyth workshops for completion in 2020.

During the annual Open Day in September at the company's premises, the company welcomes the public to see and ride examples of rail equipment brought by visiting exhibitors, and its own in-house rail equipment, on the facility's tracks, which accommodate rolling stock of 3 feet 6 inches (1067 millimetres), 3 feet 0 inches (914 millimetres), 2 feet 6 inches (762 millimetres), 2 feet 0 inches (610 millimetres) and 10 1/4 inches (260 millimetres) gauges.

In 2026, the company announced that it planned to end production of rolling stock and focus on its track engineering business by transferring its rolling stock business to The Steam Workshop.

== New and rebuilt locomotives ==
Works No.	Plated Year	Number/ name	Wheel arrangement	Gauge	Class	To	Notes
1	1974	"Trixie"	0-4-0ST OC	2 ft (610 mm)	Trixie	First steamed at Cote on 05/09/1974, sold to Meirion Mill Railway in January 1975. Returned to Alan Keef in 1976 and resold to Rail Rebecq in Belgium where it was renamed "Paula". Now located at the Tacot des Lacs railway in France.	Alan Keef Ltd did not build Trixie, though they were involved in the design. The builder was Trevor Barber, former manager of the Whipsnade and Umfolozi Railway.
2	1976	Skippy	4wDM	2 ft (610 mm)	Motorised skip wagon	Richardson's Moss Litter Co. Ltd	
3	1978			2 ft 6 in (762 mm)		Richardson's Moss Litter Co. Ltd	Rebuilt from AK 2
4	1979		4wDM	2 ft (610 mm)		Wilmslow Peat Farm; donated to Moseley Railway Trust, 2020	Available for service on Apedale Valley Light Railway
5	1979		4wDM	2 ft (610 mm)		William Sinclair Horticulture Ltd, now at The Highland Light Railway	Out of Use
6	1981		4wDM	2 ft (610 mm)		Private Location	
7	1982	BARBIE	4wDM	21 in (533 mm)		Pleasure Beach Railway, Blackpool	
8	1982	T2 SALLY	4wDH	2 ft (610 mm)		William Sinclair Horticulture Ltd	Out of Use
9	1982		4wDH	2 ft (610 mm)		Leemspoor Narrow Gauge Museum, Netherlands	
10	1983	5 ALISON	4wDH	2 ft (610 mm)		Gartell Light Railway	
11	1984	IVOR	4wDH steam outline	2 ft (610 mm)		Thorpe Park	Treasure Island Railway closed 1993
12	1984	SIR GEORGE	4wDH steam outline	2 ft (610 mm)		Greenlea Light Railway	
13R	1984		4wDH	15 in (381 mm)	Ruston & Hornsby 452280 rebuilt	Evesham Vale Light Railway	
14	1984		4wDH steam outline	2 ft (610 mm)		John Redden's Scrapyard, Wellingborough	
15	1984		4wDH	2 ft (610 mm)		India	
16	1985	WEASEL	0-6-0DH steam outline	10 1/4 in (260 mm)	Replica of Wisbech & Upwell Tramway locomotive	Wells & Walsingham Light Railway	
17	1985	3	0-4-0DH steam outline	2 ft (610 mm)		Cotswold Wildlife Park Railway	
18	1985	05 581	4wDH	2 ft (610 mm)		William Sinclair Horticulture Ltd	
19	1985	JEFFREY	4wDH	2 ft (610 mm)		William Sinclair Horticulture Ltd	
20R	1986		4wDM	2 ft (610 mm)	Ruston & Hornsby 283513 rebuilt	William Sinclair Horticulture Ltd, now at The Highland Light Railway	Dismantled
21	1987	05/582	4wDH	2 ft 6 in (762 mm)		Chemring Energetics UK Ltd	
22	1987	05/583	4wDH	2 ft 6 in (762 mm)		Chemring Energetics UK Ltd	
23	1988	3 JACK	0-4-0DH steam outline	2 ft (610 mm)		East Hayling Light Railway	
24	1988		DH	2 ft (610 mm)	U-series	Kyung Dong Coal Mine, Korea	
25	1988		DH	2 ft (610 mm)	U-series	Kyung Dong Coal Mine, Korea	
26	1988		4wDM	2 ft (610 mm)	40SD	William Sinclair Horticulture Ltd	Out of use
27	1988		Bo'Bo'-DH	9 1/2 in (241 mm)		J. Hall-Craggs	
28	1989	T9	4wDM	2 ft (610 mm)	40S	West Fife Munitions Railway	
29	1988			3 ft 6 in (1,067 mm)	60S	Nigeria	
30	1990	"Taffy"	0-4-0VBT VC	2 ft (610 mm)		Alan Keef	De Winton replica
31	Chassis (AKL) 1990 Body, Tender and Mechanical (RVM) 2012	Princess Swee' Pea	0-6-0DH steam outline	10 1/4 in (260 mm)		Hastings Miniature Railway	Substantially reconstructed; currently out of action at Bickington Steam Railway
32	1990		4wDMF	2 ft (610 mm)		Nigerian Coal Corporation	
33	1990		4wDMF	2 ft (610 mm)		Nigerian Coal Corporation	
34	1991		0-4-0TDH steam outline	2 ft (610 mm)		Singapore Zoo Railway	Garden ornament
35	1991		4-4-0DH steam outline	2 ft (610 mm)		Singapore Zoo Railway	
36	1990			3 ft 6 in (1,067 mm)	60S	Nigeria	
37	1990			3 ft 6 in (1,067 mm)	85S	Chemicals & Fertilisers of Port Harcourt, Nigeria	
38	1991	"Trijntje"	0-4-0T OC	600 mm (1 ft 11 5/8 in)		De Efteling B.V.	Efteling Steam Train Company
39	1992	SIR WINSTON CHURCHILL	0-6-2DH steam outline	15 in (381 mm)		Blenheim Park Railway	
40	1992		4wDH	2 ft (610 mm)		AKL Hire Loco	
41	1992		0-6-2DH steam outline	15 in (381 mm)		Haigh Railway	
42	1992		0-6-2DH steam outline	15 in (381 mm)			
43	1992			1,000 mm (3 ft 3 3/8 in)	60SP	Guyana Sugar Corporation	
44	1993		4wDH	3 ft (914 mm)		Peatlands Park Railway	
45	1993		4wDH	2 ft (610 mm)		India	
46	1993		4wDH	2 ft (610 mm)		Woodhead Tunnel; donated to Moseley Railway Trust	For service on Apedale Valley Light Railway
47	1994	T5 SANDRA	4wDH	2 ft (610 mm)		West Fife Munitions Railway	
48	1994		4wDH	2 ft (610 mm)		TPC, Moshi, Tanzania	
49	1994		4wDH	2 ft (610 mm)		John Muir Country Park Railway	
50	1994		4wDH	2 ft (610 mm)		India	
51	1995		0-6-2DH steam outline	15 in (381 mm)		Cricket St Thomas Railway	
52	1996	PAM	0-4-0DH	15 in (381 mm)		Wotton Light Railway	
53	1997			2 ft (610 mm)	Rail Lorry	Sub-contracted from Severn Lamb, delivered to Dream World, Cairo Egypt	
54	1998	DENSIL	0-6-0DH steam outline	10 1/4 in (260 mm)		Wells Harbour Railway	
55	1998		4wDH	3 ft 6 in (1,067 mm)		Walton Water Treatment Works; Scrapped December 2010	
56	2000			600 mm (1 ft 11 5/8 in)	K80 tram	Rainforest Ecological Train, Iguazu Falls, Argentina	
57	2000			600 mm (1 ft 11 5/8 in)	K80 tram	Rainforest Ecological Train, Iguazu Falls, Argentina	
58	1999	CHARLES	0-6-0DH steam outline	10 1/4 in (260 mm)		Ferry Meadows Railway, Peterborough	
59R	1999	80 BEAUDESERT	4wDH	2 ft (610 mm)	Motor Rail 101T018	Leighton Buzzard Light Railway	
60	2000	Edward Milner	0-6-0DH	12 1/4 in (311 mm)		Buxton Miniature Railway	
61	2000	SIR WALTER RALEIGH	0-4-0DM steam outline	18 in (457 mm)		Bicton Woodland Railway	
62	2002	4	0-2-0+1wDH	Lartigue Monorail		Listowel & Ballybunion Railway	
63	2001	JAMES GORDON	0-4-0DH steam outline	2 ft (610 mm)		Alford Valley Railway	
64	2001	POMPEY	B-B DH	15 in (381 mm)		Wotton Light Railway	
65	2001	MARGAM CASTLE	0-4-0DH steam outline	2 ft (610 mm)		Margam Country Park Railway	
66	2002	2 THE EARL OF OAKFIELD	0-4-0DH	15 in (381 mm)		Difflin Lake Railway	
67	2003		4wBE	2 ft (610 mm)		Morwellham Quay	
68	2003	4 BELLA	0-4-0DH steam outline	2 ft (610 mm)		Cotswold Wildlife Park Railway	
69R	2003	9 MARK TIMOTHY	2-6-4T OC	15 in (381 mm)	Winson 20 rebuilt	Bure Valley Railway	
70	2004	LADY ALEXANDRA	0-4-0DH steam outline	20 in (508 mm)		Great Woburn Railway	
71	2004	"PUFFING BILLY"	4wG VC	4 ft 8 1/2 in (1,435 mm) standard gauge	Replica of 1813 locomotive	Beamish Museum	
72R	2004	313 POLAR BEAR	4wBE	2 ft (610 mm)	Wingrove & Rogers 5568001 rebuilt	Groudle Glen Railway	
73	2005		0-6-0DH	12 1/4 in (311 mm)		Private owner, north Devon; later Statfold Barn Railway	
74	2005	HOWARD	0-6-0DH steam outline	10 1/4 in (260 mm)		Wells Harbour Railway	
75R	2007	2 BICTON	4wDH	18 in (457 mm)	Ruston & Hornsby 213839 rebuilt	Bicton Woodland Railway;	
76	2006	15001	0-4-0DM s/o	600 mm (1 ft 11 5/8 in)		Lithuanian Railways, Ignalina, now at Vilnius Railway Museum	
77	2007	LYDIA	2-6-2T OC	15 in (381 mm)		Perrygrove Railway	
78R	2007	6	4wDH	3 ft (914 mm)	Motor rail 102T007 rebuilt	Difflin Lake Railway	
79	2007	7 FLYNN	0-6-0DH	15 in (381 mm)		Longleat Railway	
80	2007	BORIS	0-6-0DH	10 1/4 in (260 mm)		Hotham Park Miniature Railway	
81	2008	139001	British Rail Class 139	4 ft 8 1/2 in (1,435 mm)		Parry People Movers for West Midlands Trains	
82	2008	139002	British Rail Class 139	4 ft 8 1/2 in (1,435 mm)		Parry People Movers for West Midlands Trains	
83	2008	ERIC	0-6-0DH	10 1/4 in (260 mm)		Lappa Valley Steam Railway	
84	2008	SIR PETER GADSDEN	4wBE	2 ft (610 mm)		Blists Hill Victorian Town	
85R	2010	BUNTY	2-6-0T+T OC	15 in (381 mm)	Construction started by Neville Smith and Sid Ford. completed by Alan Keef Ltd.	Heatherslaw Light Railway	
86	2010	MERLIN	0-4-0DH	2 ft (610 mm)		Wicksteed Park Railway	
87	2009	Claus	4wBE	600 mm (1 ft 11 5/8 in)		Mønsted Kalkgruber	K20E type
88	2009	Svend	4wBE	600 mm (1 ft 11 5/8 in)		Mønsted Kalkgruber	K20E type
89	2010	No 1 Eagle/Helang	4wBE Railcar	5 ft (1,524 mm)		Brunei Liquid Natural Gas	
90	2010	No 2 Sparrow/Layang-Layang	4wBE Railcar	5 ft (1,524 mm)		Brunei Liquid Natural Gas	
91	2022	Corris No. 10	0-4-2ST	2 ft 3 in (686 mm)	Replica of Corris Railway "Falcon" locomotive	Corris Railway	Under construction in 2018, a replica of one of the Corris Railway's original Hughes locomotives.
92	2012	E762 LYN	2-4-2T	600 mm (1 ft 11 5/8 in)	"Lyn" Replica	Lynton & Barnstaple Railway	Various components and final assembly of replica of 1898 Baldwin loco
93R	2013	"STEAMPLEX"	4wVBT	2 ft (610 mm)	Motor Rail 5877 rebuilt	Groudle Glen Railway	
94	2013	Winston	0-6-0DH	15 in (381 mm)		Blenheim Park Railway operating in the grounds of Blenheim Palace, in Oxfordshire, England.	
95	2014	THE DUKE	0-6-0DH	10 1/4 in (260 mm)		Wells Harbour Railway	
96R	2015	CUMBRIA	4wBE	2 ft (610 mm)	Rebuilt and regauged from Clayton B4227B/2006.	South Tynedale Railway	
97	2016		0-6-0DH	12 1/4 in (311 mm)		Ree Park – Ebeltoft Safari, Denmark	
98R	2021		4wDMRDM	4 ft 8 1/2 in (1,435 mm)		Isle of Wight Steam Railway	
99	2018	VER 4		2 ft 8 1/2 in (825 mm)	Extensive rebuild of the original car.	Volk's Electric Railway	
100	2017	Arthur	0-6-0DH(so)	12 1/4 in (311 mm)		Wellington Country Park, Reading	
101R	2018	VER 6		2 ft 8 1/2 in (825 mm)	Extensive rebuild of the original car.	Volk's Electric Railway	
102R	2018	VER 10		2 ft 8 1/2 in (825 mm)	Extensive rebuild of the original car.	Volk's Electric Railway	
103	2018	HOWARD	0-6-0DH	10 1/4 in (260 mm)		Beale Park	
104	2018	8 JOHN THYNN	B-B DH	15 in (381 mm)		Longleat Railway	
105	2019		B DH	1,000 mm (3 ft 3 3/8 in)		Centre de Culture Scientifique, Technique et Industriel, Beauport, Grande-Terre, Guadeloupe	
106	2020		Bo-Bo BE	15 in (381 mm)		Sonoma TrainTown, California	
107	2020		4wDM	2 ft (610 mm)	AK40 type	Pakistan	
108	2020		4wDM	2 ft (610 mm)	AK40 type	Pakistan	
109	2021	Lloyd		10 1/4 in (260 mm)		Ayton Castle, Scottish Borders	
110	2021	Jill	0-4-2BE	10 1/4 in (260 mm)		Delamont Miniature Railway	
111	2021		4wBE	2 ft (610 mm)		Morwellham Quay	
112	2021	9 HENRY THYNN	B-B DH	15 in (381 mm)		Longleat Railway	
113	2023	tba	B-B DH	15 in (381 mm)		Lappa Valley Railway	
60SD757	1986			3 ft 6 in (1,067 mm)	60S	Ghana Bauxite	Ordered by Ghana Bauxite from Simplex Mechanical Handling Ltd but delivered by Alan Keef Ltd.
40SD530	1987		4wDM	2 ft 8 1/2 in (825 mm)	Motor Rail 40S	Volks Electric Railway	Originally for Butterley Building Materials Ltd, ordered by them from Simplex Mechanical Handling Ltd but delivered by Alan Keef Ltd.
M001	1988		2a-2DH	Monorail		Mrs. Whites Garden Ltd, Wiltshire	
M002	1989	M002 IVOR	2a-2DH	Monorail	Skip wagon	Alan Keef Ltd	Stored
M003	1989		2a-2DH	Monorail	Skip wagon	Alan Keef Ltd	Stored
	1977	PW 3 REDGAUNTLET	4wPM	15 in (381 mm)		Romney, Hythe and Dymchurch Railway	Originally built by Michael Jacot, rebuilt on new frames 1976.
	1979	"Thomas"	4wVBG	2 ft (610 mm)		Telford Development Corporation	Frames built by Kierstead Systems & Controls; boiler and steam engine by Peter Bridges; wheelsets by Allens of Tipton; bodywork and final assembly by Keef. To Telford Horsehay Steam Trust c.1987
	1988		4wDM	2 ft (610 mm)	Motor rail 9932 rebuilt	Chilmark Mine & Teffont Quarry	
	1988	8		2 ft (610 mm)	Baguley 2w-2DM Railcar	Leighton Buzzard Light Railway	Rebuild of railcar to unpowered carriage.
	1993	1 DROMAD	0-4-2T OC	3 ft (914 mm)	Kerr Stuart 3024 rebuilt	Cavan & Leitrim Railway	
	1995		2w-2DHR	3 ft (914 mm)	Drewry Cars 1495 rebuilt	Cavan & Leitrim Railway	
	2001	STEAM ELEPHANT	6wG	4 ft 8 1/2 in (1,435 mm) standard gauge	Joint construction with Dorothea Restorations, replica of Steam Elephant.	Beamish Museum	
	2004	COL. FREDERICK WYLIE	4wDH	2 ft (610 mm)	Hunslet 9349 rebuilt	Beeches Light Railway	Line being reconstructed at new location
	2004	3 ENTERPRISE	4wDH	3 ft (914 mm)	Motor rail 60S382 rebuilt	Waterford & Suir Valley Railway	
	2019	Nancy	0-6-0T	3 ft (914 mm)	Avonside 1547 of 1908. Rebuilt between 1999 and 2019	Cavan and Leitrim Railway	

== See also ==
- British narrow gauge railways
- Lea Bailey Light Railway
