= Transport in Waterford =

This article deals with transport in Waterford city in Ireland. The city is connected by road, rail, bus, air and sea.

== Rail ==
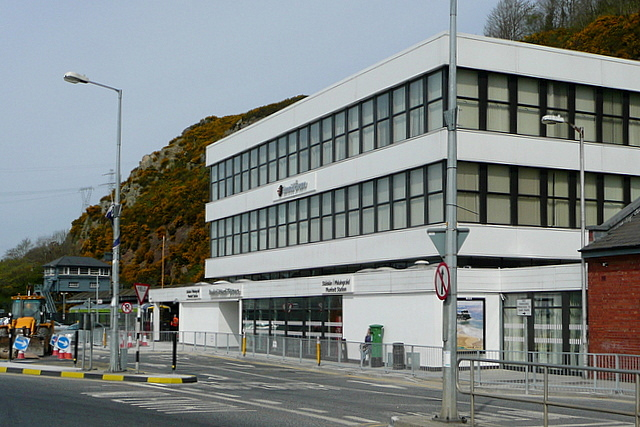
Waterford Train Station

Rail services in Waterford are provided by Iarnród Éireann, Ireland's national railway system. Rail services run from Plunkett Station Waterford. The station is located across Rice Bridge on the North side of the city. Services are provided to Dublin, Limerick, Rosslare Europort, Kilkenny, Clonmel. Freight services are also provided to Dublin, Port of Waterford and Rosslare Europort.

There are seven daily services to Dublin, including an express service which departs at 07:10 and takes 1 hour 50 minutes. Other services take around 2 Hours 10 Minutes. On Sundays there are four services.

There are two daily services to Limerick Junction via Clonmel. All services connect with Limerick, Cork, Ennis and Galway.

There used to be one daily service to Rosslare Europort. The service connected with Stena Line and Irish Ferries sailings to Fishguard and Pembroke Dock in the UK respectively. This rail service was announced to be suspended starting from 21 July 2010. It was replaced by a revised Bus Éireann route 370 service from 20 September 2010. However this bus service does not serve Waterford railway station. In November 2016 it was revealed that Waterford could lose its connection to Limerick Junction by 2018 with the closure of the Limerick Junction Waterford line by CIE/IE to save money as the line has low demand.

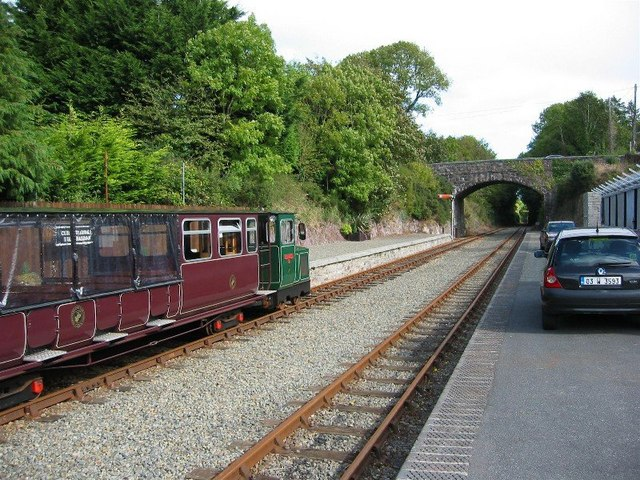
Waterford and Suir Valley Railway

The 3 ft (914 mm) narrow gauge Waterford and Suir Valley Railway follows 10 km of the old Waterford to Dungarvan - Cork route along what is now part of the Deise Greenway. It is a heritage line that runs between Bilberry outside Waterford and Kilmeaden. The railway is a registered charity which operated by volunteers.

== Coach ==
Eurolines Coach route 890 ceased running in 2018.

| Number | Locations Served |
|---|---|
| 890 | Pembroke Dock, Kilgetty, Carmarthen, Pont Abraham, Cardiff, Bristol, Reading and London Victoria Coach Station |

== Bus ==
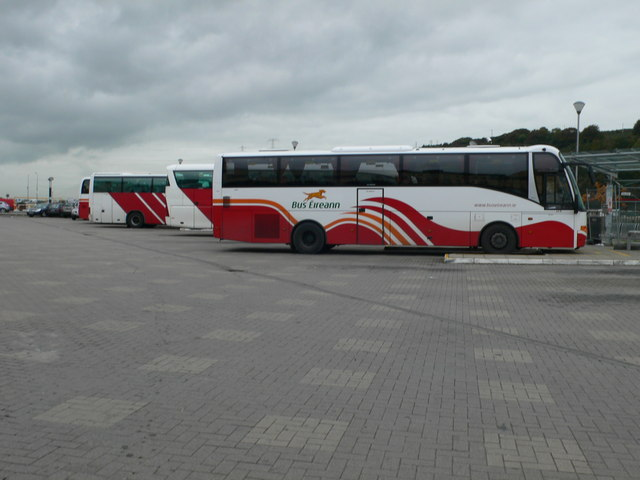
Waterford Bus Station

Bus Éireann and JJ Kavanagh and Sons provide bus services around Waterford city centre and to other towns and cities in Ireland. All regional bus services depart from the Waterford Bus Station on the quay and city centre services run throughout the city.

As of 2010, planning for bus lanes in the city centre was at an early stage. At the time, as part of a "city centre green plan", bus lanes were proposed for Parnell Street, Manor Street, The Mall, and the South Quays.

Proposed bus route changes in Waterford city as part of the ongoing BusConnects infrastructure programme have been deferred until 2027.

Bus Éireann City services

| Number | Route |
|---|---|
| W1 | Clock Tower - The Mall - Parnell Street - Manor Street - Manor Village - The Vee - WIT - Ballybeg - Ashe Road - Canon Street - Barrack Street - Mayor's Walk - Ballybricken - Waterford Bus Station - Clock Tower |
| W3 | Clock Tower - The Mall - Parnell Street - John Street - Ballytruckle - Saint John's Park - Greenfields - Avondale - Kilcohan Park - Ballytruckle - Parnell Street - The Mall - Clock Tower |
| W2 | Clock Tower - Waterford Bus Station - Thomas Street - Ballybricken - Lower Yellow Road - Morrisson's Road - Canon Street - Lisduggan - Brownes Road - WIT - Ashe Road - Hennessey's Road - Ceannt Road - College Street Campus - Parnell Street - The Mall - Clock Tower |
| W4 | Peter Street - Clock Tower - Waterford Bus Station - Thomas Street - Hypercentre - Congress Place - Dominick Place - Gracedieu Road - Carrickpherish Road - Cleaboy Road - Brownes Road |
| W5 | University Hospital Waterford - Farran Park - Parnell Street - The Mall - Clock Tower - Waterford Bus Station - Thomas Street - Ballybricken - Lower Yellow Road - Upper Yellow Road - Hillview |

J. J. Kavanagh & Sons Waterford City Service

| Number | Route |
|---|---|
| 607 | Tesco Ardkeen - Williamstown Road - Ballygunner - Dunmore Road - Clock Tower - Ferrybank - Abbey Park |
| 617 | Ballygunner - Dunmore Road - Clock Tower - Ferrybank - Slieverue (and serves Tesco Ardkeen, Williamstown Road, and Abbey Park after 19:00) |
| 627 | Ballygunner - Dunmore Road - Clock Tower - Rockshire Road - Newrath |

Bus Éireann Regional services

| Number | Route |
|---|---|
| 4/X4 | New Ross - Waterford - Carlow - Dublin - Dublin Airport |
| 40 | Waterford - New Ross - Wexford - Rosslare Europort - (east) |
| 40 | Waterford - Dungarvan - Youghal - Cork - Killarney - Tralee (west) |
| 55 | Waterford - Clonmel - Limerick - Shannon Airport |
| 73 | Waterford - Athlone - Longford |
| 360/A | Waterford - Tramore |
| 362 | Waterford - Kilmacthomas - Dungarvan |
| 365 | Waterford - Thomastown |
| 366 | Waterford - Cappoquin - Lismore |
| 367 | Waterford - Carrick-on-Suir, Clonmel |
| 370 | Waterford - New Ross − Campile - Duncannon − Wellingtonbridge - Wexford - Rosslare Strand - Rosslare Europort |
| 371 | Waterford - New Ross - Adamstown |

J. J. Kavanagh & Sons

| Number | Route |
|---|---|
| 736 | Waterford - Carlow - Dublin - Dublin Airport |
| --- | (WIT) - Thurles - Roscrea - Cashel - Clonmel - Nenagh |

Dublin Coach

| Number | Route |
|---|---|
| 600 | Cork - Dungarvan - Waterford Institute of Technology - Waterford - Kilkenny - Dublin |

Suir Way Regional services

| Number | Route |
|---|---|
| 611 | Waterford - Dunmore East |
| 608 | Waterford - Passage East |
| 609 | Waterford - Portlaw |

== Roads ==
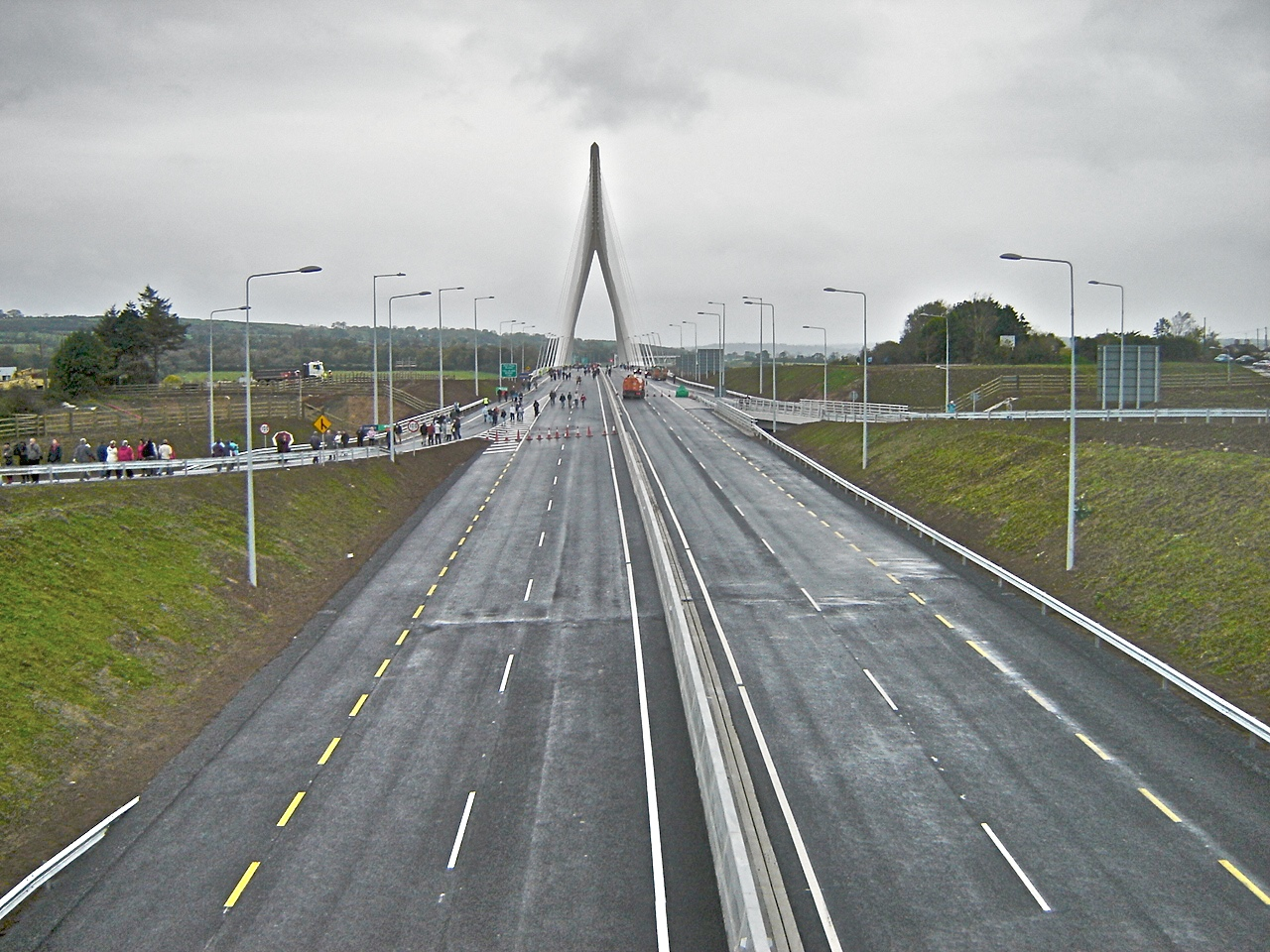
River Suir Bridge on the Waterford City Bypass

On 19 October 2009 the N25 Waterford City Bypass opened. The route consists of 23 kilometres (14 mi) of dual carriageway as well as 14 km (9 mi) of single carriageway and a second crossing over the River Suir. The road was designed as a toll road.

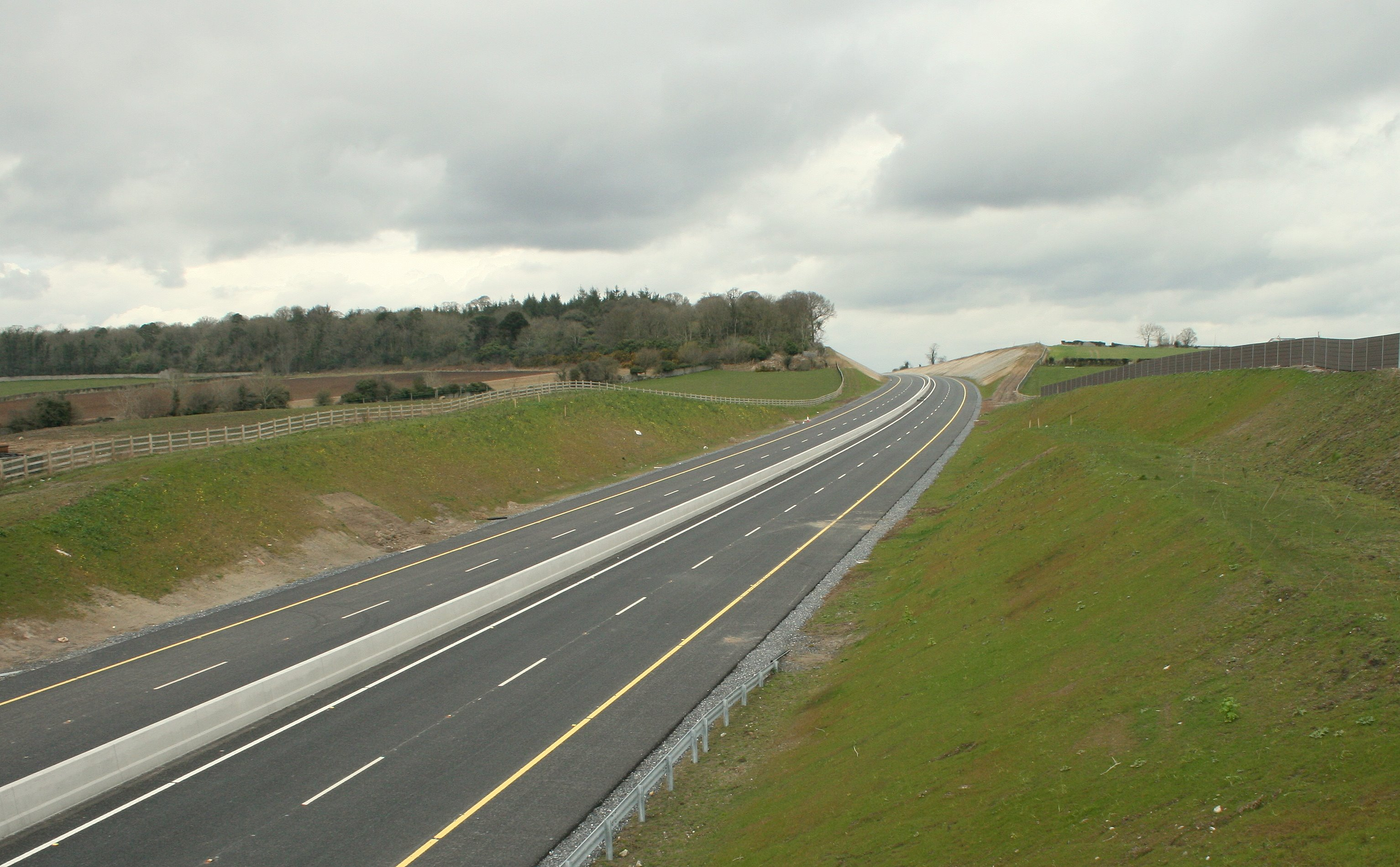
M9 Waterford–Dublin Motorway

On 22 March 2010, a section of the M9 opened as part of the new motorway linking Waterford with Dublin. The final section between Carlow and Knocktopher was opened on 9 September 2010, completing the 118.5 kilometres (73.6 mi) route. Journey times to Kilkenny, Carlow and Dublin have been reduced.

In 2007 the R710 Outer Ring Road opened. The road is a dual-carriageway which connects Ardkeen with the Waterford City Bypass, which in turn connects to major primary routes. The R709 forms the Inner Ring Road around the south of the inner city. Waterford Airport is located on the R708 road, accessible from the city centre and ring roads.

| Road | Route | E-Route |
|---|---|---|
| | Kilkenny - Carlow - Dublin | --- |
| | Clonmel - County Tipperary - Limerick | --- |
| | New Ross - Wexford - Rosslare Europort (east) | E-30 |
| | Dungarvan - Youghal - Cork (west) | E-30 |
| | Waterford City - Port of Waterford | --- |

== Cycling ==
As of 2010, Waterford City Council were in the early stages of planning for cycle tracks in the city centre. In July 2010, the council started to put cycle lanes around the city. A cycle lane in both directions on the Cork road starts from Ballybeg and continues into the city centre. As of 2010, lanes were also being put on the quays.

The Waterford Greenway is Ireland's longest greenway, and connects the city with Mount Congreve, Kilmeaden, Kilmacthomas, and Dungarvan.

== Waterford Port ==
Port of Waterford which was located adjacent to the city centre until 1992 was moved to Belview on the N29 on the north bank of the River Suir. The Port is the closest to mainland Europe from Ireland. Waterford Port is one of the busiest ports in Ireland.

The port is important for tourism in Waterford. Cruise Ships dock in Dunmore East, Waterford Port and the quay in Waterford City Centre. In September 2008 a new 190-metre quay was built that cost €11 million.

In 2017 the port of Waterford handled a gross tonnage of 2.5 million.

The port hosted the Tall Ships race in 2005 and 2011.

The closest passenger port is Rosslare Europort in County Wexford (72 km (45 miles) away by road), which has services to Fishguard, Pembroke Dock, Cherbourg, Roscoff and Le Havre.

== Air ==
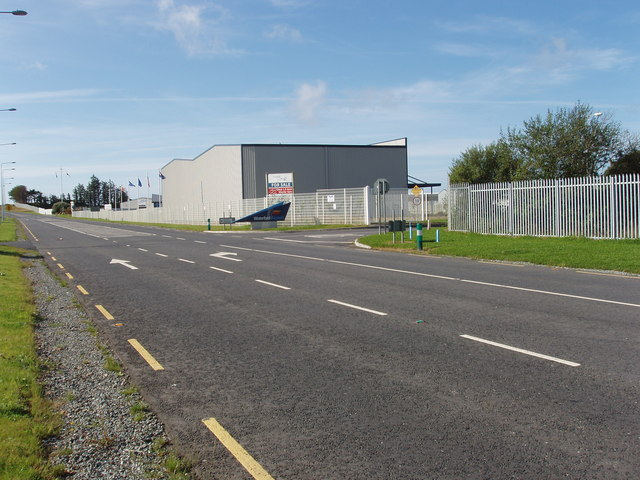
Entrance to Waterford Airport

Waterford Airport is located 9 km south-east of Waterford. The airport serves Waterford and the south east region. As of 2025, there is no carrier operating flights at the airport.

There is an air sea rescue service operating out of Waterford Airport from a dedicated Irish Coastguard base. This operation is currently contracted to a private operator, CHC Ireland. Rescue cover is provided by a Sikorsky S-61. A reserve S-61 helicopter is also based here.

== See also ==
- Transport 21
- Transport in Ireland
- Rail transport in Ireland
- Roads in Ireland
