= Ballybeg =

Ballybeg is an anglicisation of the Irish language term, Baile Beag, which means "Little Town". Ballybeg is the name of a number of small townlands and villages in Ireland, including:

== Villages and townlands ==
- Ballybeg, County Antrim, a townland in County Antrim, Northern Ireland
- Ballybeg, a townland in County Carlow, Republic of Ireland
- Ballybeg in Clarecastle, County Clare, Republic of Ireland
- Ballybeg Priory near Buttevant, County Cork, Republic of Ireland
- Ballybeg, a townland in County Down, Northern Ireland
- Ballybeg, a townland in County Laois, Republic of Ireland
- Ballybeg, a townland near Strokestown, County Roscommon, Republic of Ireland
- Ballybeg, County Tipperary, a townland in County Tipperary
- Ballybeg, County Tyrone, a townland in County Tyrone, Northern Ireland
- Ballybeg, County Waterford, a suburb of Waterford, Republic of Ireland
- Ballybeg, Faughalstown, a townland in Faughalstown civil parish, barony of Fore, County Westmeath, Republic of Ireland
- Ballybeg, Kilcumreragh, a townland in Kilcumreragh civil parish, barony of Moycashel, County Westmeath, Republic of Ireland
- Ballybeg, a village in County Wicklow, Republic of Ireland

== Fictional places ==
- Ballybeg (fictional town), the fictional County Donegal town in which Irish playwright Brian Friel set works such as Philadelphia Here I Come! and Dancing at Lughnasa
