= 5 ft 6 in gauge railway =

Railway track gauge (1676 mm)

5 ft 6 in (1,676 mm), also known as the Indian gauge, is a broad track gauge, used on Indian, Pakistani, western Bangladeshi, Sri Lankan, Argentine and Chilean railway systems, and on the BART system in the San Francisco Bay Area, United States.

In North America, it is called Indian, Provincial, Portland, or Texas gauge (or in the San Francisco Bay Area region of California, BART gauge). In Argentina and Chile, it is known as trocha ancha (Spanish for "broad gauge"). In the Indian subcontinent, it is simply known as "broad gauge". It is the widest gauge in use of heavy-duty mainline railways in the world.

== Asia ==
=== India ===
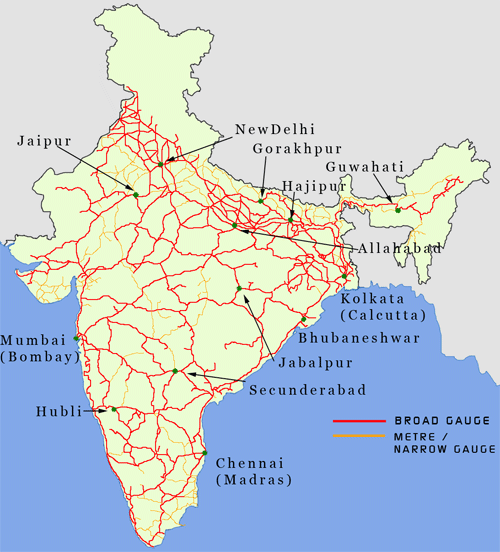
Railway map of India in 2005 with 1,676 mm (5 ft 6 in) lines colored red

In India, the initial freight railway lines were built using standard gauge. In the 1850s, the Great Indian Peninsula Railway adopted the gauge of 1,676 mm (5 ft 6 in) for the first passenger railway in India between Bori Bunder in Bombay and Thane. This was then adopted as the standard for the nationwide network.

Indian Railways today predominantly operates on 1,676 mm (5 ft 6 in) broad gauge. Most of the metre gauge and narrow gauge railways have been converted to broad gauge. Small stretches of the network that remain on metre and narrow gauges are also in the process of being converted to broad gauge. Rapid transit lines, such as the Mumbai Metro and Bengaluru Metro, are mostly on standard gauge, although certain early rapid transit lines (namely, the Kolkata Metro and part of the Delhi Metro) use 1,676 mm (5 ft 6 in) broad gauge. High-speed rail routes, such as the Mumbai–Ahmedabad high-speed rail corridor, use standard gauge.

=== Bangladesh ===
Bangladesh Railways uses a mix of 1,676 mm (5 ft 6 in) broad gauge and metre gauge. The broad gauge network is primarily located to the west of the Jamuna River, while the metre gauge network is primarily located to its east. The Jamuna Bridge is a mixed-use bridge that contains a dual gauge connection across the river linking both networks.

=== Nepal ===
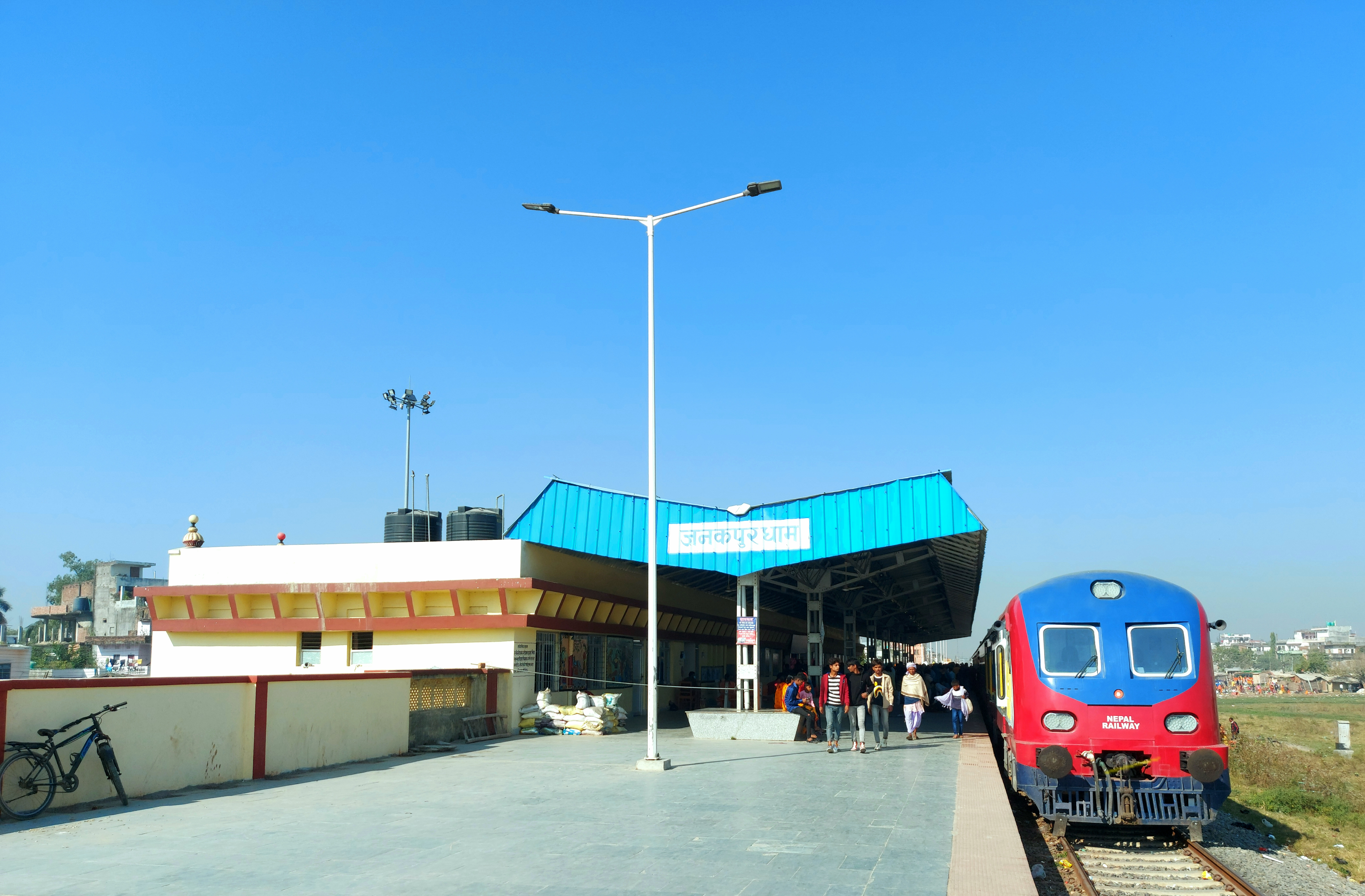
Janakpur, a modern Nepalese station on the Jaynagar–Bardibas railway line, interworking with India

In Nepal, all services currently operate on 1,676 mm (5 ft 6 in) broad gauge only. Its predecessor, Nepal Government Railway used 762 mm (2 ft 6 in) narrow gauge from 1927 to 1965.

=== Pakistan ===
In Pakistan, all services currently operate on 1,676 mm (5 ft 6 in) broad gauge only, except for the singular 27.1 km (16.8 mi) line of Lahore Metro.

=== Sri Lanka ===
In Sri Lanka, all services currently operate on 1,676 mm (5 ft 6 in) broad gauge only.

== Europe ==
=== United Kingdom ===
The 1,676 mm (5 ft 6 in) broad gauge was first used in Scotland for two short, isolated lines: the Dundee and Arbroath Railway (1836–1847) and the Arbroath and Forfar Railway (1838–). Both lines were subsequently converted to standard gauge.

=== Spain and Portugal ===
The Iberian-gauge railways, that service much of Spain and Portugal, have a track gauge of 1,668 mm (5 ft 5 21/32 in), just 8 mm (5/16 in) different from 1,676 mm (5 ft 6 in). Used rolling stock from Iberia has been employed on broad-gauge lines in Argentina and Chile.

== North America ==
=== Canada ===
Canada became the first British colony, in the 1850s, to use 1,676 mm (5 ft 6 in) broad gauge. It was known as the "Provincial gauge" in Canada.

The earliest railways in Canada, including the 1836 Champlain and St. Lawrence and 1847 Montreal and Lachine Railway, however, were built to 4 ft 8 1/2 in (1,435 mm) standard gauge.

The Grand Trunk Railway, which operated in several Canadian provinces (Quebec and Ontario) and American states (Connecticut, Maine, Massachusetts, New Hampshire, and Vermont), used it, but was changed to standard gauge in 1873. The Grand Trunk Railway operated from headquarters in Montreal, Quebec, although corporate headquarters were in London, England. The St. Lawrence and Atlantic Railroad, which operated in Quebec, Vermont, New Hampshire and Maine also used it but was converted in 1873.

There is a longstanding rumour that the Provincial gauge was selected specifically to create a break-of-gauge with US railways, the War of 1812 still being a fresh memory. However, there is little supporting evidence for this, and this story appears to be traced to a single claim from the late 1800s.

=== United States ===
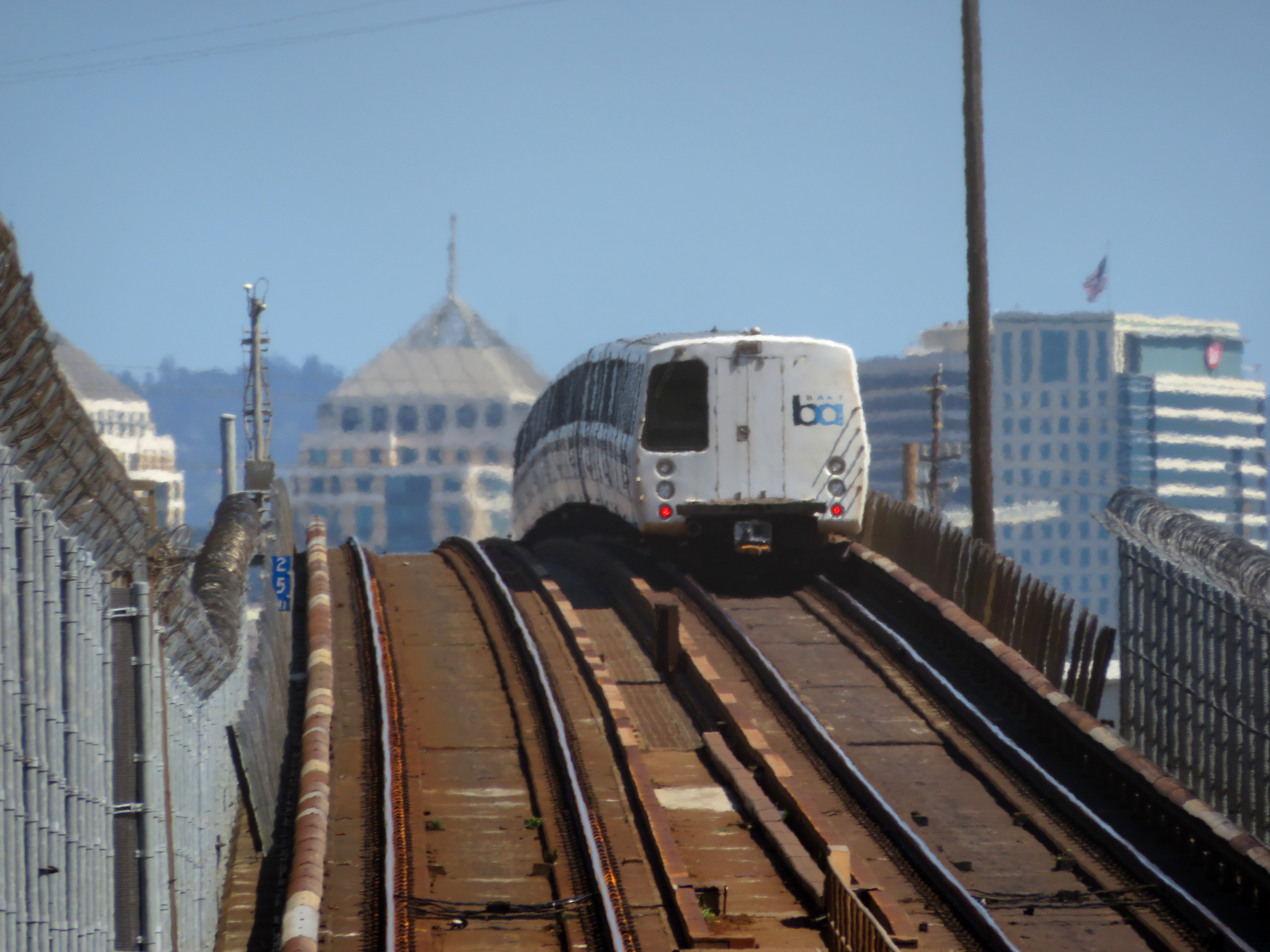
Bay Area Rapid Transit tracks, laid to 5 ft 6 in (1,676 mm) with third rail electrification

The Bay Area Rapid Transit system is the only operating railroad in the United States to use 5 ft 6 in (1,676 mm) broad gauge, with 120 miles (190 km) of double tracked routes. The original engineers chose the wide gauge for its "great stability and smoother riding qualities" and intended to make a state-of-the-art system for other municipalities to emulate. The use of 5 ft 6 in (1,676 mm) broad-gauge rails was one of many unconventional elements included in its design, which, in addition to its unusual gauge, also used flat-edge rail, rather than typical rail that angles slightly inward (although the shape of BART wheels and rail has been modified since then). This has complicated maintenance of the system, as it requires custom wheelsets, brake systems, and track maintenance vehicles.

The New Orleans, Opelousas and Great Western Railroad (NOO&GW) used 5 ft 6 in (1,676 mm) broad gauge until 1872, and the Texas and New Orleans Railroad used 5 ft 6 in (1,676 mm) broad gauge ("Texas gauge") until 1876. The Grand Trunk Railway predecessor St. Lawrence and Atlantic Railroad, which operated in Quebec, Vermont, New Hampshire and Maine also used 5 ft 6 in (1,676 mm) broad gauge ("Canadian gauge", "Provincial gauge" or "Portland gauge") but was converted in 1873. Several Maine railroads connected to the Grand Trunk Railway shared its "Portland Gauge". The Androscoggin and Kennebec Railroad and the Buckfield Branch Railroad were later consolidated as the Maine Central Railroad, which converted to standard gauge in 1871. John A. Poor's chief engineer Alvin C. Morton compiled the following advantages of "Portland Gauge" for Maine railways in 1847:

- Frost heaves (swelling of wet soil upon freezing) produce an uneven running surface causing an irregular rocking motion as trains moved past. A wider wheelbase offered a steadier ride with less wear on the machinery and roadbed.
- Wider cars offered more room for passengers and cargo. Train length would be reduced for cars carrying the same amount of cargo. Shorter trains would lessen the effects of side winds, and permit more efficient application of power.
- Wide-gauge locomotives offered more room to place reciprocating machinery inside, rather than outside, the driving wheels. Reciprocating machinery was a source of vibration before mechanical engineering encompassed a good understanding of dynamics; and keeping such vibration close to the center of mass reduced the angular momentum causing rocking.
- Wider fireboxes and boilers allowed more powerful locomotives. The alternative of longer boilers held the disadvantage of poor firebox draft through the increased frictional resistance of longer boiler tubes.
- More powerful locomotives carrying fewer, larger cars would have reduced manpower requirement for engine crews and shop personnel.
- For locomotives of equal power, fuel consumption increased as gauge decreased, especially in colder outside temperatures.
- More powerful wide-gauge locomotives would be more capable for plowing snow; and thereby provide more reliable winter service.
- Several gauges were in widespread use, and none had yet come into clear dominance.
- Freight transfer was preferable to exchange of cars between railways because unowned cars were abused on foreign railways.
- The Grand Trunk Railway system, feeding the seaport of Portland, Maine, offered little need for gauge transfer prior to loading on export shipping.
- Potential advantages of freight transfer to the standard-gauge railroad from Portland to Boston seemed insignificant as long as competitive rates were available for transport on steamships between the two ports.
- The majority of Canadian freight anticipated to be carried over rail lines to Portland was heavy and bulky in comparison to its value, and must be transported cheaply in large quantities to maintain profitability for producers and transporters.

== South America ==
=== Argentina ===
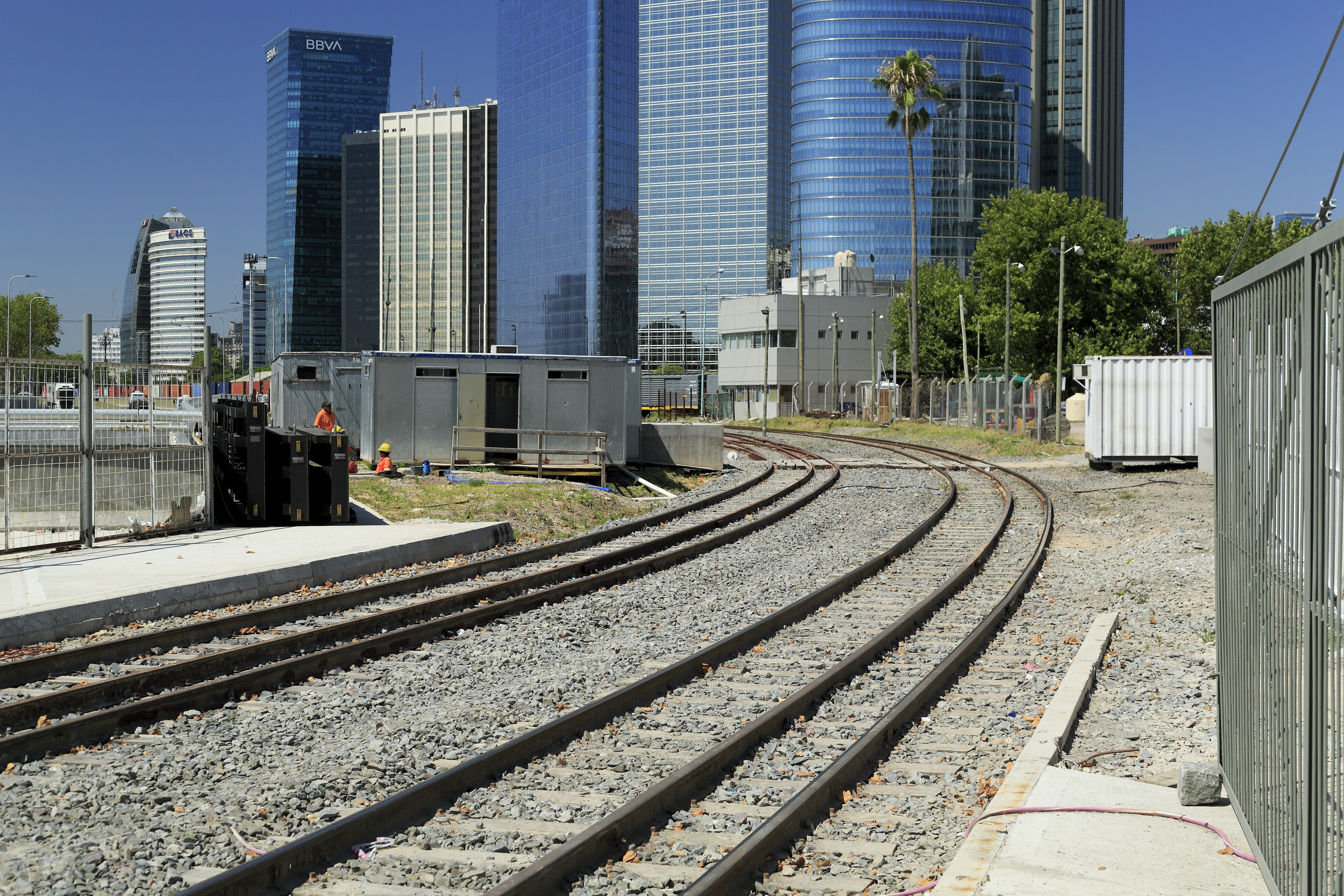
Dual-gauge 5 ft 6 in (1,676 mm) and 1,000 mm (3 ft 3 3/8 in) track in Argentina

The national railway network is predominantly on 1,676 mm (5 ft 6 in) broad gauge.

=== Chile ===
Most links of 1,676 mm (5 ft 6 in) broad gauge railways are in the center-south of the country. Only a few lines of the Ferrocarril del Sur (Southern Railroad Network) were 1,000 mm (3 ft 3 3/8 in) metre gauge or 1,435 mm (4 ft 8 1/2 in) standard gauge, the notable exceptions being one of the few active links: the Ramal Talca-Constitución branch and the Metro de Santiago. On the contrary, just a few branches of the FCN (Ferrocarril del Norte) were broad gauge, most notably the Mapocho-Puerto mainline between Santiago and Valparaiso, the Santiago–Valparaíso railway line. This link was directly connected to the southern railroad network using the Matucana tunnel that connected Mapocho and the Central Station in Santiago. The Transandine Railway that connected both Argentinean and Chilean broad gauge networks through the Uspallata pass in the Andes mountains was actually a 1,000 mm (3 ft 3 3/8 in) narrow gauge link.

== Similar gauges and compatibility ==
The Iberian gauge (1,668 mm or 5 ft 5 21/32 in) is closely similar to the Indian gauge, with only 8 mm (5/16 in) difference, and allows compatibility with the rolling stock. For example, in recent years Chile and Argentina have bought second hand Spanish and Portuguese Iberian-gauge rolling stock. 1,668 mm trains can run on 1,676 mm gauge without adaptation, but for better stability in high-speed running a wheelset replacement may be required (for example, Russian-Finnish train Allegro has 1,522 mm or 4 ft 11 29/32 in gauge, intermediate between Russian 1,520 mm or 4 ft 11 27/32 in and Finnish 1,524 mm or 5 ft). Backward compatibility—1,676 mm trains on 1,668 mm gauge—is possible, but no examples and data exist. Due to the narrower gauge, a strong wear of wheelsets may occur without replacement.

== Operational railways ==
Country or territory	Railway	Route length	Notes
Argentina	San Martín Railway		operating
Argentina	Sarmiento Railway		operating
Argentina	Mitre Railway		except Tren de la Costa in standard gauge; operating
Argentina	Roca Railway		except La Trochita, Central Chubut Railway and Ramal Ferro Industrial Río Turbio in 750 mm (2 ft 5 1/2 in) gauge; operating
Bangladesh	Bangladesh Railway	1,575 km (979 mi)	operating
Chile	Empresa de los Ferrocarriles del Estado - EFE Sur		operating
Chile	Empresa de los Ferrocarriles del Estado - EFE Central		Except Ramal Talca-Constitución; operating
Chile	Empresa de los Ferrocarriles del Estado - Metro de Valparaíso		operating
Chile	Empresa de los Ferrocarriles del Estado - Biotrén		operating
India	Indian Railways	135,207 km (84,014 mi)	operating
India	Delhi Metro	65 km (40 mi)	operating
India	Kolkata Metro	45.48 km (28.26 mi)	operating
Iran	Zahedan railway station to border with Pakistan		operating
Nepal	Nepal Railways	59 km (37 mi)	operating
Pakistan	Pakistan Railways	7,791 km (4,841 mi)	operating
Sri Lanka	Sri Lanka Railways	1,508 km (937 mi)	operating
United States	Bay Area Rapid Transit (BART) San Francisco Bay Area	131.4 mi (211.5 km)	operating

== Closed railways ==
Country or territory	Railway	Length	Notes
Canada	Grand Trunk Railway		Converted to 4 ft 8 1/2 in (1,435 mm) standard gauge in 1873
Canada	St. Lawrence and Atlantic Railroad		Converted to 4 ft 8 1/2 in (1,435 mm) standard gauge in 1873
Canada	Grand Trunk Railway of Canada		Converted to 4 ft 8 1/2 in (1,435 mm) standard gauge
Canada	Intercolonial Railway of Canada		Converted to 4 ft 8 1/2 in (1,435 mm) standard gauge in 1875
Paraguay	Paraguayan railway		From Asunción to Encarnación was originally laid in this gauge in the hope that the connecting line from Posadas to Buenos Aires would be built to the same gauge; that line was laid to standard gauge, and when the FCPCAL reached Encarnación in 1912 the whole line had to be re-gauged to standard gauge to allow through-working.
United Kingdom	Arbroath and Forfar Railway		see Scotch gauge, converted to standard gauge
United Kingdom	Dundee and Arbroath Railway	16 3/4 mi (27.0 km)	see Scotch gauge, converted to standard gauge
United States	Maine Central Railroad		converted to standard gauge in 1871

== See also ==
- Broad-gauge railway
- Heritage railway
- List of track gauges
- History of rail transport in Argentina
- History of rail transport in Bangladesh
- History of rail transport in Chile
- History of rail transport in India
- History of rail transport in Pakistan
- Rail transport in Argentina
- Rail transport in Bangladesh
- Rail transport in Chile
- Rail transport in India
- Rail transport in Pakistan
- Rail transport in Sri Lanka
- Track gauge in Chile
