= Tifal brothers =

American architects

Gustav, William, and Charles Tifal, also known as Tifal brothers or Tifal, were American architects best known for their American Craftsman-style houses in Los Angeles and Monrovia, California.

== Biography ==
The Tifals immigrated to the United States from Posen, Germany. Eldest brother Gustav first settled in Monrovia, California in 1909, looking to recuperate after finishing a project in Mexico. While there, he became interested in local real estate and opened a firm with his younger brothers. They maintained offices in Monrovia and Los Angeles, where they would become synonymous with both the development of Los Angeles and the American Craftsman style.

The Tifals also acted as developers, and between 1911 and 1914 they built more than fifty houses in the East 52nd Place Tract on a speculative basis for around $2000 ($65,152 in 2025) each.

Charles, the youngest brother, designed most of the Tifal homes despite having no formal architectural training, while Gustav and William ran the company and oversaw construction. In the 1920s, Charles partnered with Ralph Hurlburt and continued his career in San Diego, then in the 1930s, he continued solo.

== Architectural style ==
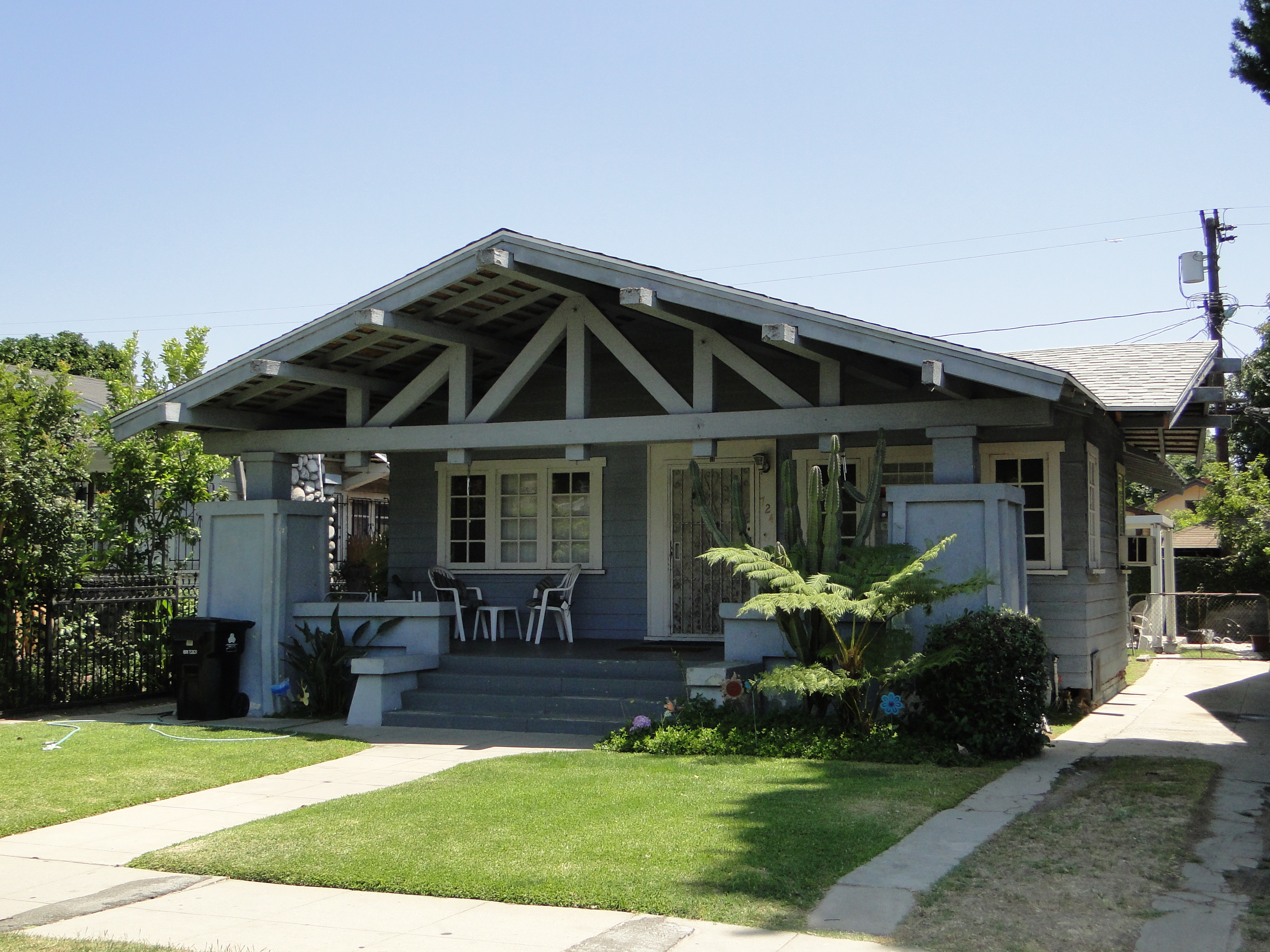
Ivie Anderson House in the 52nd Place Historic District

The Tifals were defining contributors to American Craftsman architecture, their houses representing the design, materials, and craftsmanship of the movement. Characteristic elements of Tifal houses include a one story height, an exterior sheathed in either wood shingles or clapboard, and a low-pitched gable roofs. Further design elements include overhanging eaves with exposed rafter tails, wood sash and casement windows, front porches, and porch piers and chimneys made of Arroyo stone, clinker brick, and stucco.

== List of works ==
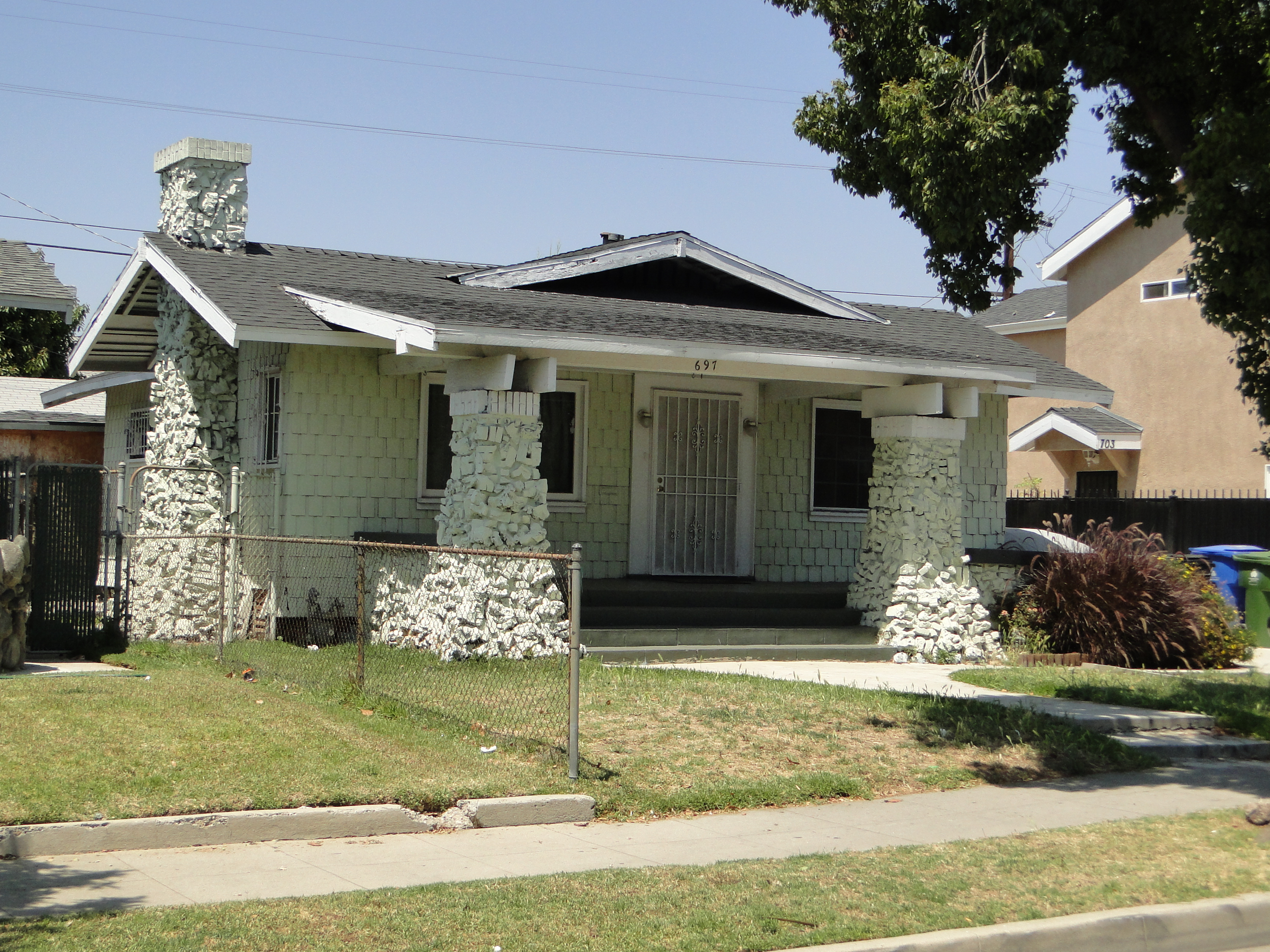
Charlotta Bass House in the 52nd Place Historic District

The Tifals built more than 350 Craftman-style homes and bungalows in Los Angeles and more than 100 in Monrovia, including:

- 37 contributing, five non-contributing, and two demolished properties in the 52nd Place Historic District plus nine additional contributing and one additional non-contributing properties in the 52nd Place Tifal Brothers Tract Historic Preservation Overlay Zone (1911-1914)
- Monrovia Historic Landmark No. 20, 21, 30, 43, 48, 54, 56, 62, 63, 66, 96, 108, 131, and 138 (1911-1917)
- Residence at 1291 North Mentor Avenue in Pasadena (1915), contributing property in the Bungalow Heaven Historic District

Other Tifal works include:

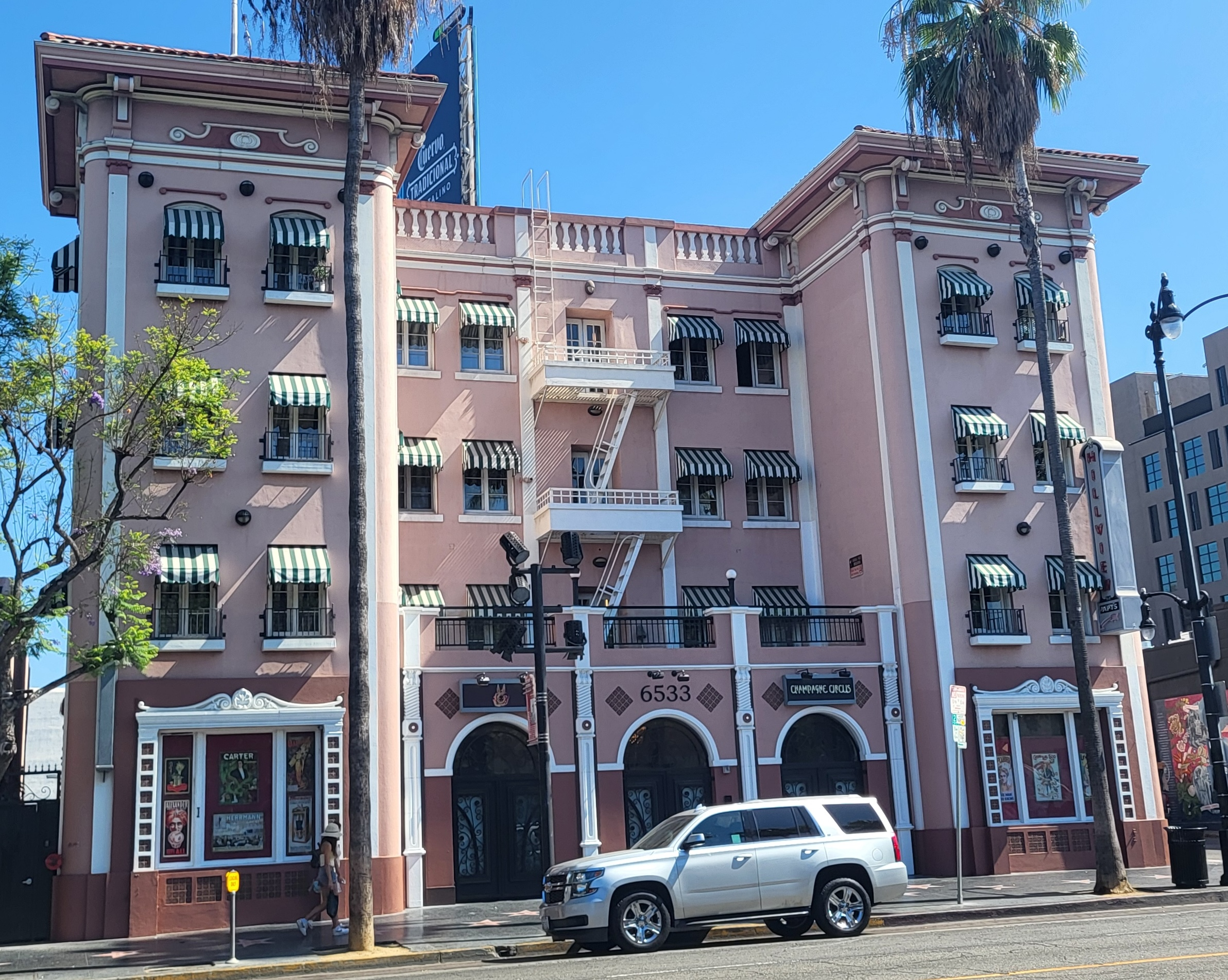
The Hillview in the Hollywood Boulevard Commercial and Entertainment District

- The Hillview (1917), contributing property in the Hollywood Boulevard Commercial and Entertainment District

Additional works by Charles Tifal, all of which are San Diego Historic Landmarks (SDHLs) and all from the 1920s done with Ralph Hurlburt, include:

- Edwin and Rose Emerson House (1924), SDHL No. 697
- Sam and Mary McPherson House (1925), No. 824
- John W. Snyder Company Model Home No. 2 (1925), No. 906
- John W. Snyder Company Model Home No. 3 (1925), No. 933
- John Snyder Spec House#3 (1926), No. 1089
- J. Francis and Clara Munro House (1926), No. 1056
- Ralph and Helene Benton House (1926), No. 1318
- Edward and Emma Barrett House (1930), No. 1147

== See also ==
- List of American architects
- List of people from Los Angeles
