= Adolfo Suaya =

Argentine-American restaurateur, hotelier, and television host

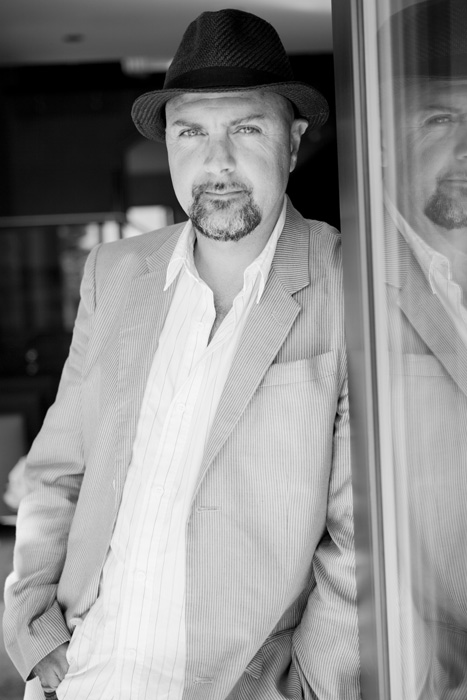
- Born: March 16, 1961 (age 65)
- Occupations: Entrepreneur; hotelier; restaurateur; TV Host
- Known for: Founder of Gaucho Grill (and other LA area restaurants); Host of Latin American Foodie

Adolfo Suaya (born March 16, 1961) is an Argentine-American restaurateur, hotelier, and television host. He has founded or financed numerous Southern California restaurants and bars including Gaucho Grill, Dolce, the Lodge, Osaka, and others. He served as host of the Sun Channel television series, Latin American Foodie and Foodie Trips. Suaya also owns hotels in Uruguay and Argentina.

== Early life ==
Suaya was born on March 16, 1961. He dropped out of high school early to pursue entrepreneurship. At age 17, he opened a children's clothing business, and, two years later, he began a separate business designing and manufacturing ski jackets. At age 21, Suaya moved to Europe where he lived for a year and a half before returning to Buenos Aires to study acting. In 1985, at the age of 24, he moved to Los Angeles to more thoroughly study film and acting at the Lee Strasberg Theatre and Film Institute. After his schooling, Suaya had roles in a few films and directed another prior to focusing on his entrepreneurial career.

== Career ==
Suaya opened his first restaurant, Gaucho Grill, on Sunset Boulevard in 1986. By 1996, he had opened a chain of 12 Gaucho Grill restaurants. In 2003, he opened Dolce Enoteca e Ristorante. By 2006, he was the landlord for or operator of 15 Southern California restaurants including Memphis, Bella Cucina, The Lodge, Geisha House, Sushi Roku, and others. He was also in the process of opening two other restaurants, Goa Nightclub and BlackSteel.

In 2008, Suaya branched out into the hospitality business, opening Casa Suaya, a resort hotel in José Ignacio, Uruguay. Two years later, he opened The Surly Goat, a West Hollywood bar on Santa Monica Boulevard. In 2011, the number of restaurants or bars in which Suaya had a stake had gone from 17 at his peak to 3: The Surly Goat, BoHo, and Osaka (which opened that year).

That year, Suaya began work as host on the Sun Channel television series, Latin American Foodies. The show aired Latin American and featured Suaya traveling to different locations to sample food from local eateries. In 2013, Suaya opened The Phoenix, a Beverly Hills bar located on La Cienega Boulevard. After opening and closing several times, Suaya moved the establishment to Los Angeles and rebranded it as a whiskey bar called The Phoenix LA in 2016. In 2015, he opened his second hotel, the Hotel Clásico, in Palermo Hollywood in Buenos Aires. He also opened the Casa Suaya Condo Hotel, a companion to the original Casa Suaya in José Ignacio. In June 2016, Suaya filed plans with the city of Los Angeles for a hotel near the Hollywood Walk of Fame. He also began work on a new series, Foodie Trips, also for Sun Channel.
