= Track gauge in Chile =

The most common track gauge in Chile is the Indian gauge 1,676 mm (5 ft 6 in). In the north there is also some 1,000 mm (3 ft 3 3/8 in), metre gauge, rail track.

== Indian gauge ==
- Valparaíso Metro
- Biotren
- Metrotrén
- TerraSur

== Standard gauge ==
- Santiago Metro

== Metre gauge ==
- Arica–La Paz railway
- Ferrocarril de Antofagasta a Bolivia
- Ramal Talca-Constitución
- Ferronor

== 3' 6" gauge ==
- Maria Elena - Tocopilla railway

== See also ==
- Rail transport in Chile

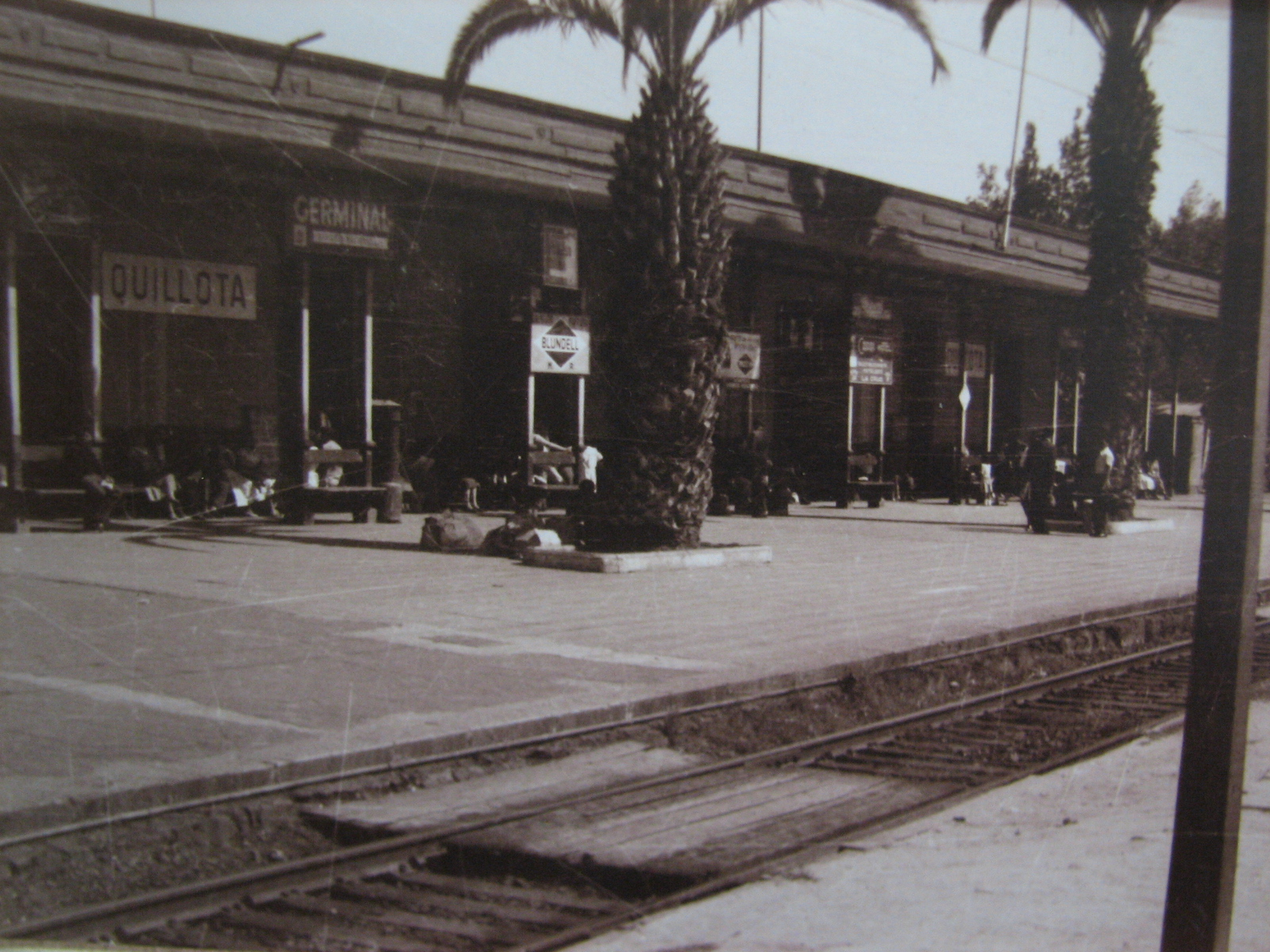
Train Station, Quillota, Chile.
