= The Hillview =

Historic building in Hollywood, California, U.S.

- Hillview Apartments
- U.S. Historic district – Contributing property
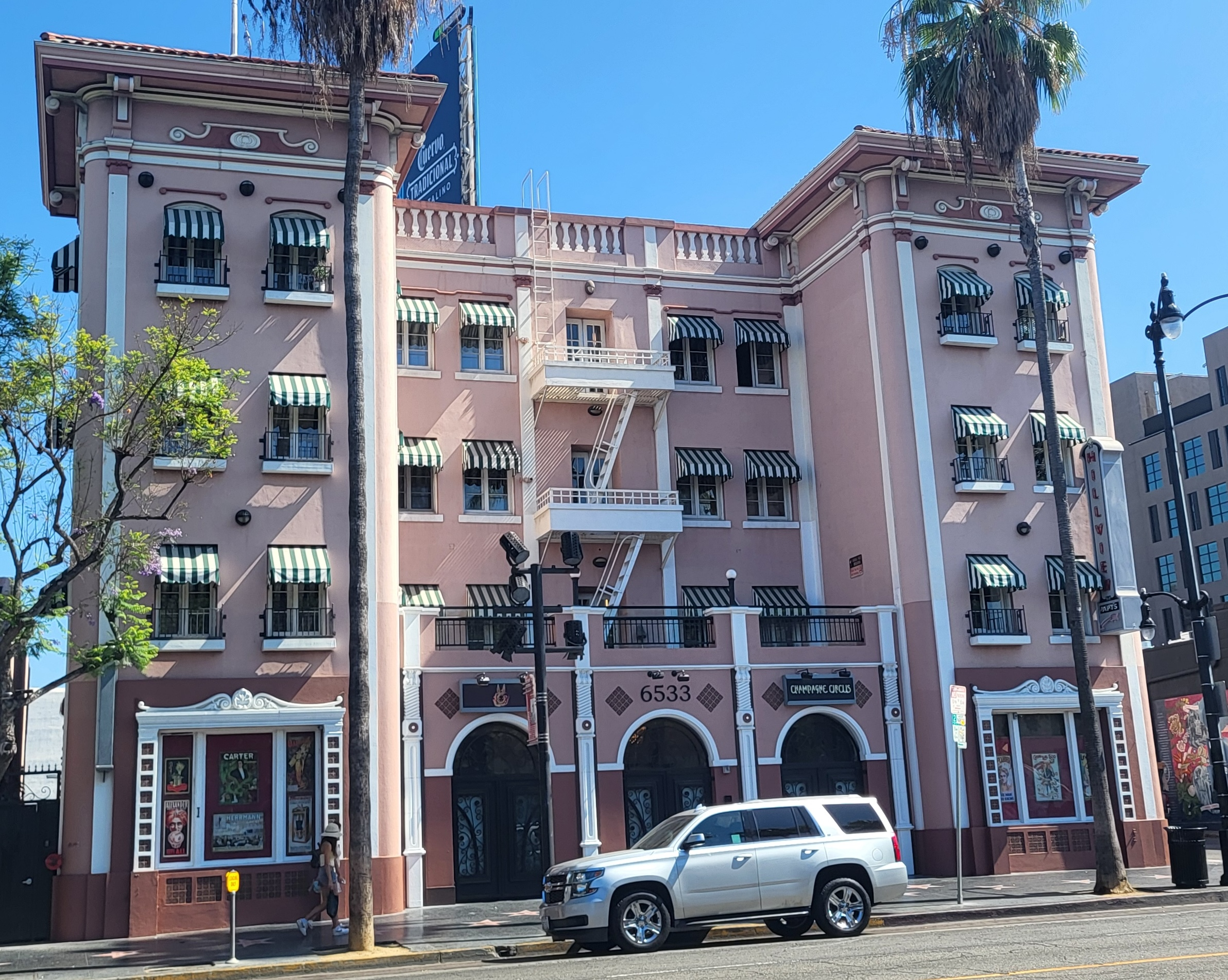
- The building in 2024

- Location within the Los Angeles metropolitan area
- Location: 6533 Hollywood Blvd., Hollywood, California
- Coordinates: 34°06′07″N 118°19′56″W
- Built: 1917
- Architect: Tifal brothers
- Architectural style: Mediterranean Revival
- Part of: Hollywood Boulevard Commercial and Entertainment District (ID85000704)
- Designated CP: April 4, 1985

The Hillview, also known as Hillview Apartments, Historic Hillview Hollywood, The Hudson Apartments, and The Harlan Residences, is a historic building located at 6533 Hollywood Boulevard, Hollywood, California, on the corner of Hollywood Blvd and Hudson Ave. Considered Hollywood's first artist's high-rise, it was a hotspot during the silent era.

== History ==
The Hillview was founded in 1917 by movie moguls Jesse L. Lasky, co-founder of Paramount Pictures, and his brother-in-law Samuel Goldwyn, co-founder of MGM. Designed by the Tifal brothers in the Mediterranean Revival style, the building was Hollywood's first apartment complex built specifically to accommodate actors and from 1917 to 1922 was the tallest building in Hollywood. Amenities included a parlor lobby, writing room, ladies waiting room, garbage incinerators, and automatic elevators.

During Hollywood's silent era, The Hillview became a local hotspot, with residents that included Viola Dana, Mae Busch, Oliver Hardy, Evelyn Brent, and more. Charlie Chaplin was once the building's proprietor, and the basement was used as rehearsal space until Rudolph Valentino reputedly converted it to a speakeasy.

In 1985, the Hollywood Boulevard Commercial and Entertainment District was added to the National Register of Historic Places, with Hillview Apartments listed as a contributing property in the district."

Tenants resided in The Hillview until 1994, when the building suffered structural damage, first from the Northridge Earthquake and later during construction of the B Line. A building fire caused further damage in 2002, at which point the building was saved from destruction and refurbished. Further renovations were performed in 2006, after which tenants filled the building once again.

In October 2009, The Hillview's owner filed for bankruptcy, forcing the building into foreclosure, after which the new owner changed the building's name to The Hudson Apartments. In July 2010, real estate investment group CIM purchased the building for $13 million ($16.2 million in 2025).

In October 2021, True Urban USA and JCI Development bought The Hillview from Adolfo Suaya for $19.2 million ($22.8 million in 2025). They then restored the building and renamed it The Harlan Residences.

== Architecture and design ==
The Hillview features a Mediterranean Revival design that includes bracketed cornice, sash windows, and a red tiled roof with some classical ornament.

== Filming location ==
The Hillview was featured in the Crazy Ex-Girlfriend episode I'm Making up for Lost Time (season 4 episode 4).

== See also ==
- List of contributing properties in the Hollywood Boulevard Commercial and Entertainment District
