= Wotton Light Railway =

Light railway in Buckinghamshire, England

The Wotton Light Railway is a private 15 in (381 mm) gauge light railway located near Wotton Underwood in Buckinghamshire. It is the hobby of High Court judge Sir Jeremy Sullivan. Although the line is privately owned and operated, it may be viewed at strategic points where it crosses public footpaths, and by invitation on occasional operating days.

== Locomotives ==
| Name | Livery | Locomotive type | Wheel arrangement | Builder | Year built | Notes |
|---|---|---|---|---|---|---|
| Sandy | WLR dark blue | Steam | 0-6-0 | Exmoor Steam Railway | | Principal steam locomotive. |
| Pam | WLR dark blue | Diesel hydraulic | 0-4-0DH | Alan Keef | 1996 | Shunting locomotive. |
| Pompey | WLR dark blue | Diesel hydraulic | B-B DH | Alan Keef | 2001 | Principal diesel locomotive. |

== Rolling stock ==
The railway is equipped with a small fleet of 8-seater semi-open passenger carriages. There are several freight wagons, including open wagons in which passengers are sometimes conveyed. There is an enclosed brake van, which will accommodate two members of train crew.
