= Narrow-gauge railways in South America =

Metre and 3 ft (914 mm) gauge lines are found in South America. Some of the 1,000 mm (3 ft 3 3/8 in) gauge lines cross international borders, though not as efficiently as they might.

Argentina, Bolivia, Brazil and Chile have 1,000 mm (3 ft 3 3/8 in) gauge lines. Colombia and Peru have 3 ft (914 mm) gauge lines.

== Argentina ==
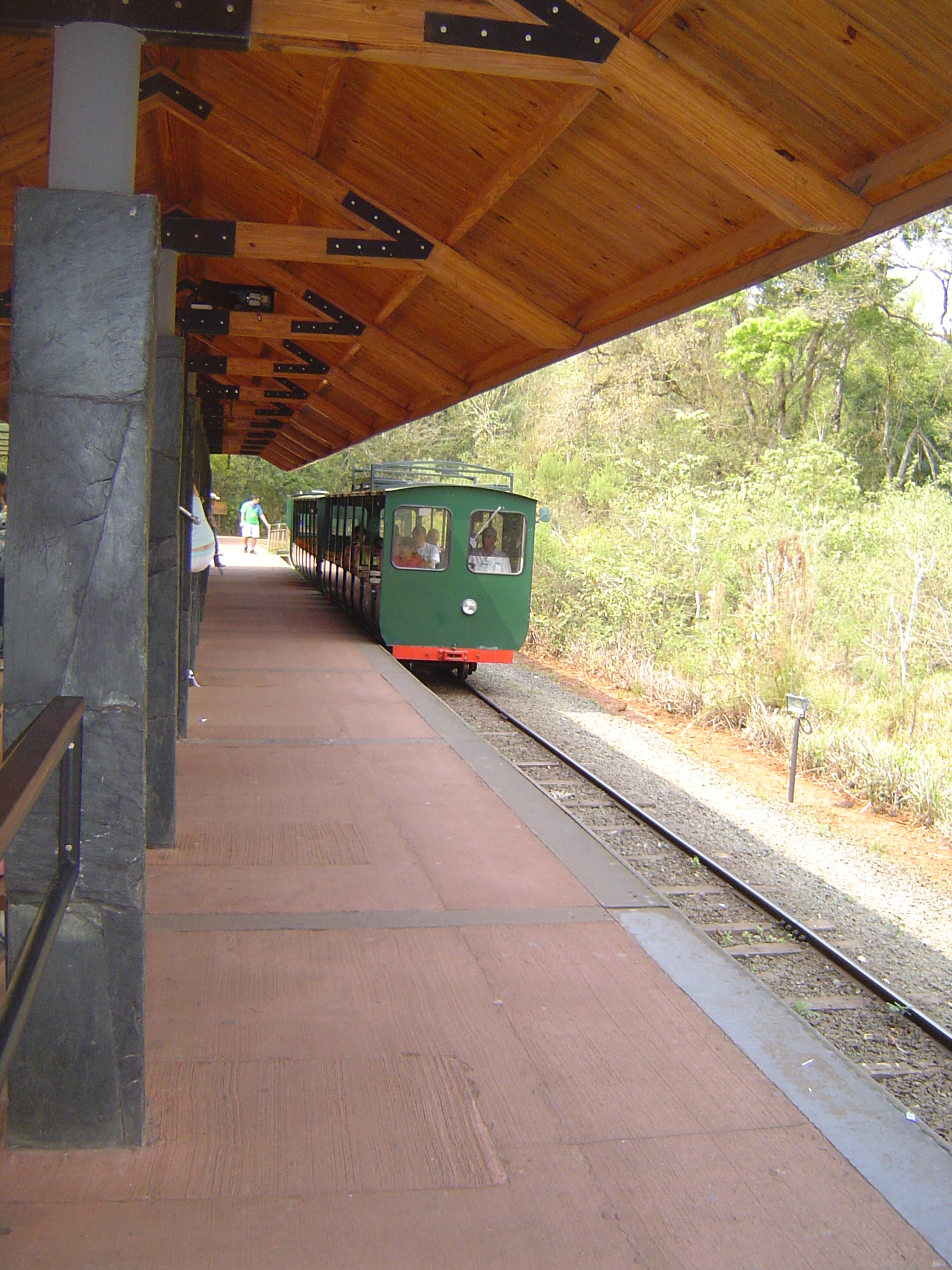
The Rainforest Ecological Train in Argentina

1,000 mm (3 ft 3 3/8 in) railways are found in the northern half of the country.

The Old Patagonian Express (La Trochita) is a 402 km-long 750 mm (2 ft 5 1/2 in) narrow-gauge railway in the Andean foothills of Patagonia, now running as two portions of its original length, and only as a tourist attraction. However, all the track is preserved.

The Southern Fuegian Railway (End of the World Train) on a 500 mm (19 3/4 in) track is considered the southernmost operating railway in the world, also solely as a tourist operation.

The Ferrocarril Económico Correntino is a former 600 mm (1 ft 11 5/8 in) railway in the Northern Corrientes Province.

The Rainforest Ecological Train is a 600 mm environmentally-friendly train that runs through the forest inside Iguazú National Park in the north of the province of Misiones of Argentina

There is also a coal railway Ramal Ferro Industrial Río Turbio, that however is no longer in operation. It previously operated between Rio Turbio and Rio Gallegos (later Punta Loyola) on 750 mm (2 ft 5 1/2 in) track gauge. See also Rio Turbio Railway.

== Bolivia ==
All railways in Bolivia are 1,000 mm (3 ft 3 3/8 in) gauge.

== Brazil ==
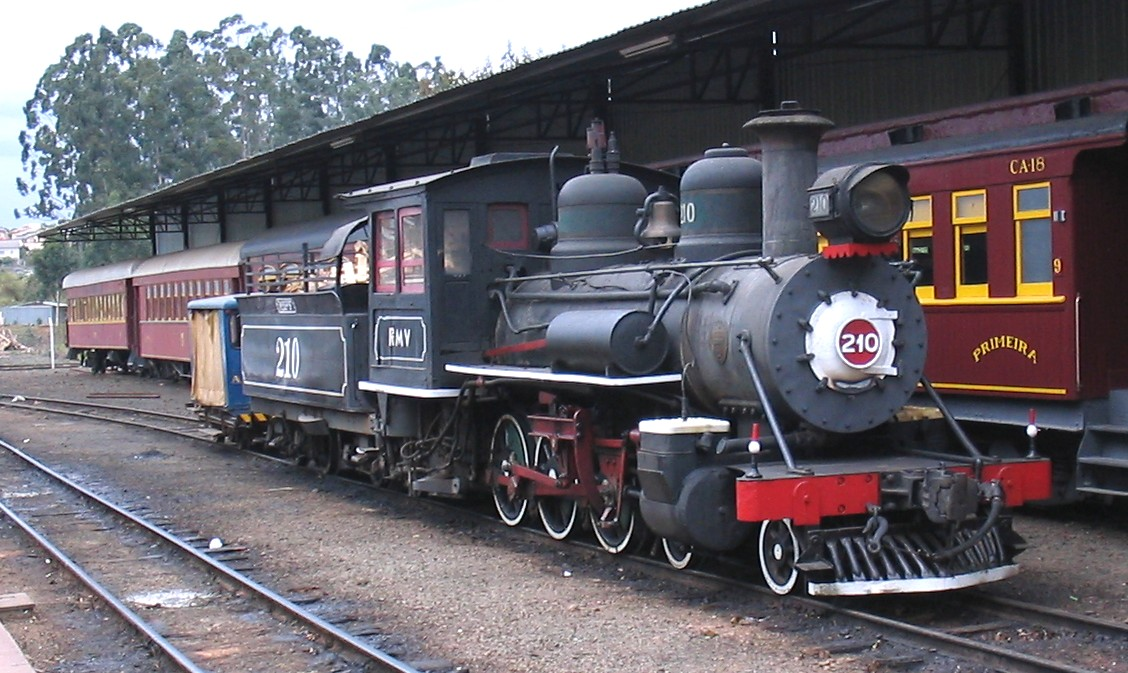
Anhumas station in Campinas, São Paulo.

In Brazil, almost all the lines are 1,000 mm (3 ft 3 3/8 in) gauge, with the exception of a few lines in the states of São Paulo, Minas Gerais, Rio de Janeiro and Mato Grosso. Vale (ex-CVRD) also has a line with 1,600 mm (5 ft 3 in) gauge lines once operated in Minas Gerais, centered on the city of São João del-Rey. This network at one time had over 770 km of railway in operation, but only about 13 km remain in operation as a steam powered tourist railway. Other small narrow-gauge lines include the Rio de Janeiro streetcar (Bonde de Santa Teresa), with approximately 13 km of 1,100 mm (3 ft 7 5/16 in) gauge, and a very short industrial railway near Bertioga built to 800 mm (2 ft 7 1/2 in) gauge. A number of industrial (a 2 ft (610 mm) gauge Portland Cement line near São Paulo, for example) and agricultural (rubber plantations, sugar plantations, logging) railways also existed in Brazil in a number of narrow gauges, but few of those survive today.

== Chile ==
Metre-gauge railways are found in the northern half of the country but are no longer in operation. The Ferrocarril de Antofagasta a Bolivia was originally built to 2 ft 6 in (762 mm) gauge, as were a number of mining and nitrate railways. The Transandean railway was metre gauge but is no longer in operation between Chile and Argentina. However, there is a short section used for industrial (copper) operations in the area between the station at Los Andes and the Río Blanco station.

== Colombia ==
Most of the railways in Colombia are 3 ft (914 mm) gauge.

== Ecuador ==
The railways in Ecuador are 3 ft 6 in (1,067 mm) track gauge. This is a famous route, the one that zig zags past the chilling canyon of the Devil's Nose. Floods, landslides and government neglect have put this operation in doubt, but they are working to restore the railway. The recently elected president Rafael Correa declared the state of emergency of the national railway. He has secured funding for a master plan to restore it to its previous glory. In the first phase of this plan, the Ecuadorian government will invest over US $283 million to completely repair the country's existing railway system and infrastructure, such as bridges, walls and stations. The government will also purchase new locomotives. A second phase seek the building of new railway lines to connect the country with Brazil and Venezuela. Currently two Baldwin locomotives are ready to work, depending on track and traffic. There are also a number of diesel railbuses and some Alstom diesel locomotives available.

The railway from Guayaquil to Quito featured in the 1983 BBC television series Great Little Railways.

== Peru ==
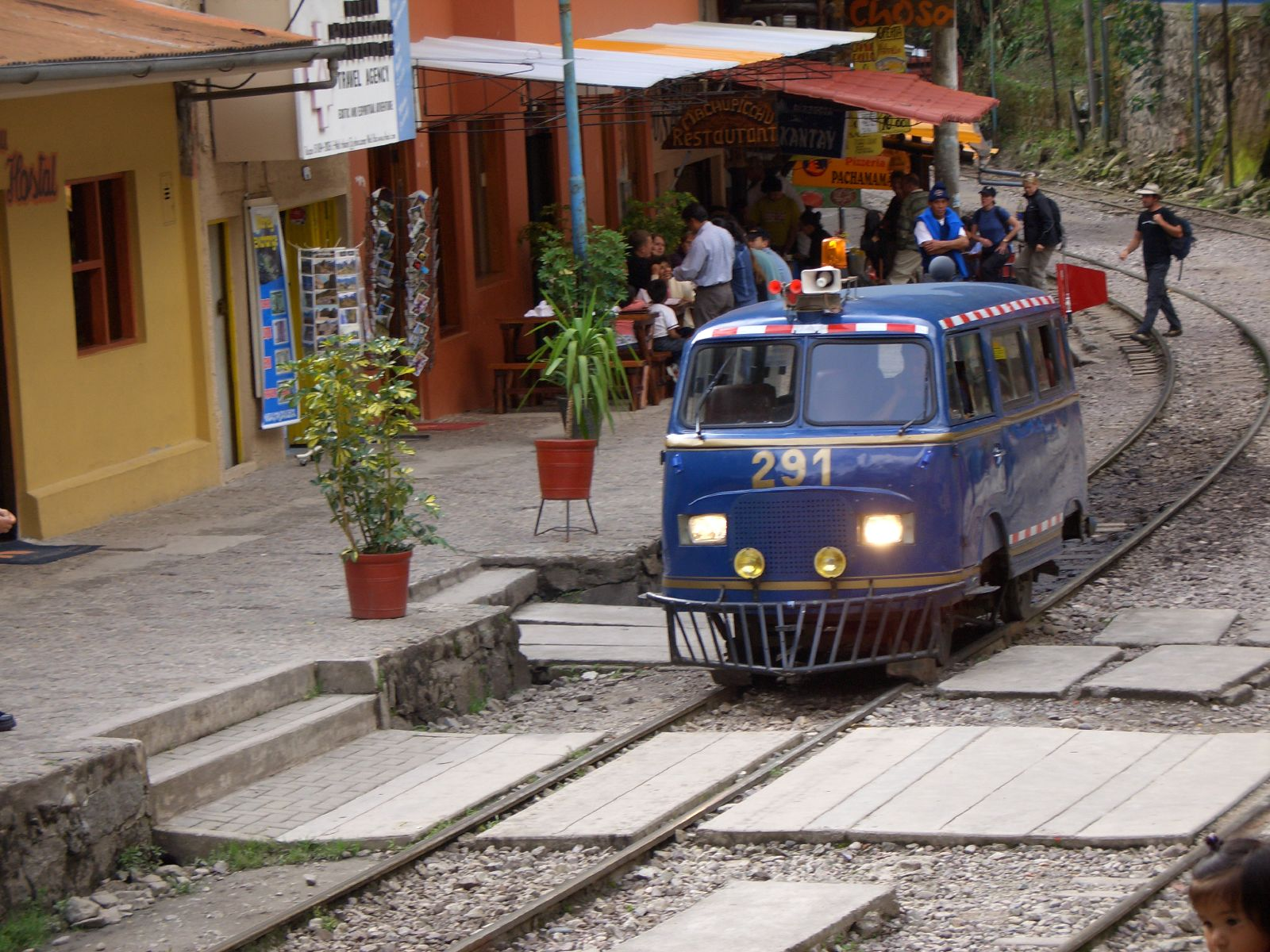
Railbus Officials in Aguas Calientes.PeruRail train at Machupicchu in May 2007

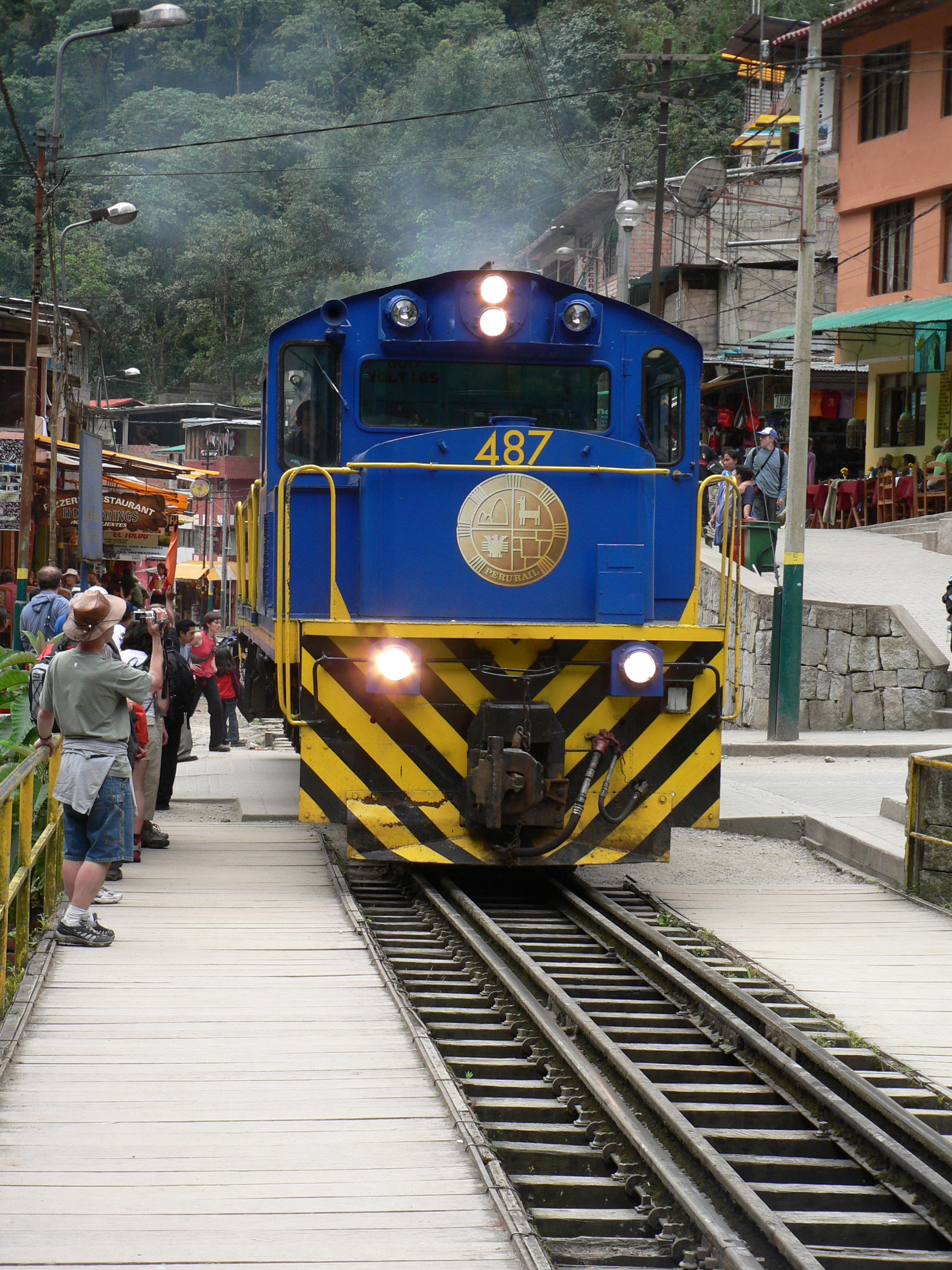
PeruRail train at Machupicchu in May 2007

PeruRail operate the narrow-gauge railway train Cusco - Machu Picchu line, the last station Aguas Calientes. The other train operating on the line is the luxury "Hiram Bingham" run by a WagonLit Inc of Europe (part of Orient Express company) and is incredibly expensive. The Cuzco – Quillibama line in Peru is 3 ft (914 mm) gauge. The other 3 ft narrow-gauge Huancayo-Huancavelica Railway was converted to 1,435 mm (4 ft 8 1/2 in) standard gauge.

== Uruguay ==
There were four big narrow gauge lines in Uruguay: Puerto del Sauce (now Juan Lacaze)-Terminal: 3 ft (914 mm), (1901–1959), Piriapolis-Pan de Azucar: 750 mm (2 ft 5 1/2 in) (1903–1958), km 393-Arrozal 33: 600 mm (1 ft 11 5/8 in) and km 110-Cantera Burgueño: 600 mm. All were dismantled. There were also several quarry lines of 600 mm gauge, among them the famous INDARE sand line. Around 300 m of that sand line is preserved and also a lot of steam locomotives. One of those is in working order. Also, a new narrow-gauge line, of around 1 km, with two diesel locomotives from the former km 110-Cantera Burgueño line, was constructed in a park on the town of Santiago Vazquez, in the West of Montevideo.
