= Wellington Country Park =

Park in Hampshire, England

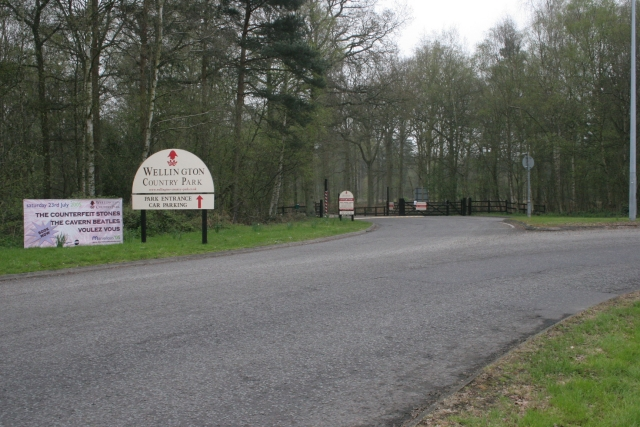
- A view of Wellington Country Park
- Interactive map of Wellington Country Park
- Location: Hampshire, United Kingdom
- Nearest city: Riseley, Berkshire
- Coordinates: 51.359°N 0.961°W
- Area: 350 acres (1.4 km^{2})
- Opened: 1974
- Camp sites: Yes
- Hiking trails: Yes
- Water: Lake
- Species: Coniferous and deciduous woodlands
- Public transit: Reading Buses Number 7
- Website: www.wellingtoncountrypark.co.uk

Wellington Country Park is a country park in Riseley, near Reading.

== Overview ==
The park consists of 350 acres (1.4 km^{2}) of coniferous and deciduous woodlands with attractions, several nature trails, and a lake. The park has attractions aimed at the 3-8 age group, including adventure playgrounds, mini golf, an animal farm, miniature railway and jumping pillow.

It was opened in 1974 by the 8th Duke and Duchess of Wellington.

The park also has a campsite which has sole use of the children's play area facilities when the park itself closes.
