= Hillview School for Girls =

Hillview School For Girls

Location
- Brionne Gardens; Tonbridge, Kent, TN9 2HE; England
- Coordinates: 51°11′18″N 0°17′00″E

Information
- Type: Secondary; Academy
- Motto: Pure Potential
- Established: 1854
- Specialist: Performing Arts
- Department for Education URN: 137104 Tables
- Ofsted: Reports
- Head teacher: Hilary Burkett
- Gender: Girls (boys admitted in the Sixth Form)
- Age: 11 to 18
- Colours: Navy, Red, White
- Website: www.hillview.kent.sch.uk

Hillview School For Girls is a performing arts college with academy status in Tonbridge, Kent. It has an age range of students aged 11–18.

== History ==
The school was built on Waterloo Road, Tonbridge in 1854 as a response to the increasing population of working class citizens in the parish. The school was then known as 'Tonbridge Secondary School'. The school enrollment toll was 54 but rose to 122 girls by 1868. In 1871 the school moved to a larger site on the corner of St. Stephens St. and Pembury Road. Again, the school grew in size (258 girls on roll in 1891).

In 1929 the girls moved to the Technical Institute in Avebury Avenue. 207 senior girls were housed in four different buildings including those above the town's library. In 1936 the school moved once more to a purpose-built school. It was nicknamed by the locals as 'Hectorage Road School' and had 315 girls on roll. There was originally a single-storey building but this was replaced in due course by a two-storey building.

The date the school took the name of 'Hillview School for Girls' was 1968 when the then Head Mistress decided to show a true spirit of democracy and ask the girls to suggest a new name for the school. Once the nominations had been received a ballot was held and the winner was Hillview School for Girls.

In 1996 the school expanded with a new Maths and Technology block. In 2000 Hillview was chosen to be a Beacon School, the first such secondary school in Kent. A new building was erected on the lower site, giving a new sports hall, three new Science rooms and 7 new classrooms. In 2001 the school gained the status of Performing Arts College, which led to the building of a Studio Theatre. The school also received an Arts Mark Award from the Arts Council of England.

In 2002 a new building linked the main school building with the Maths and Technology block with the addition of two new rooms and a lift for the disabled. In September 2005 a £5 million building project was completed to provide 22 classrooms, Sixth Form and staff accommodation, a new entrance and administration area.

In 2018, Hillview was inspected by Ofsted and judged to be 'Good'.
