= Rainforest Ecological Train =

Coordinates: 25°41′03″S 54°26′56″W

Tren Ecológico de la Selva
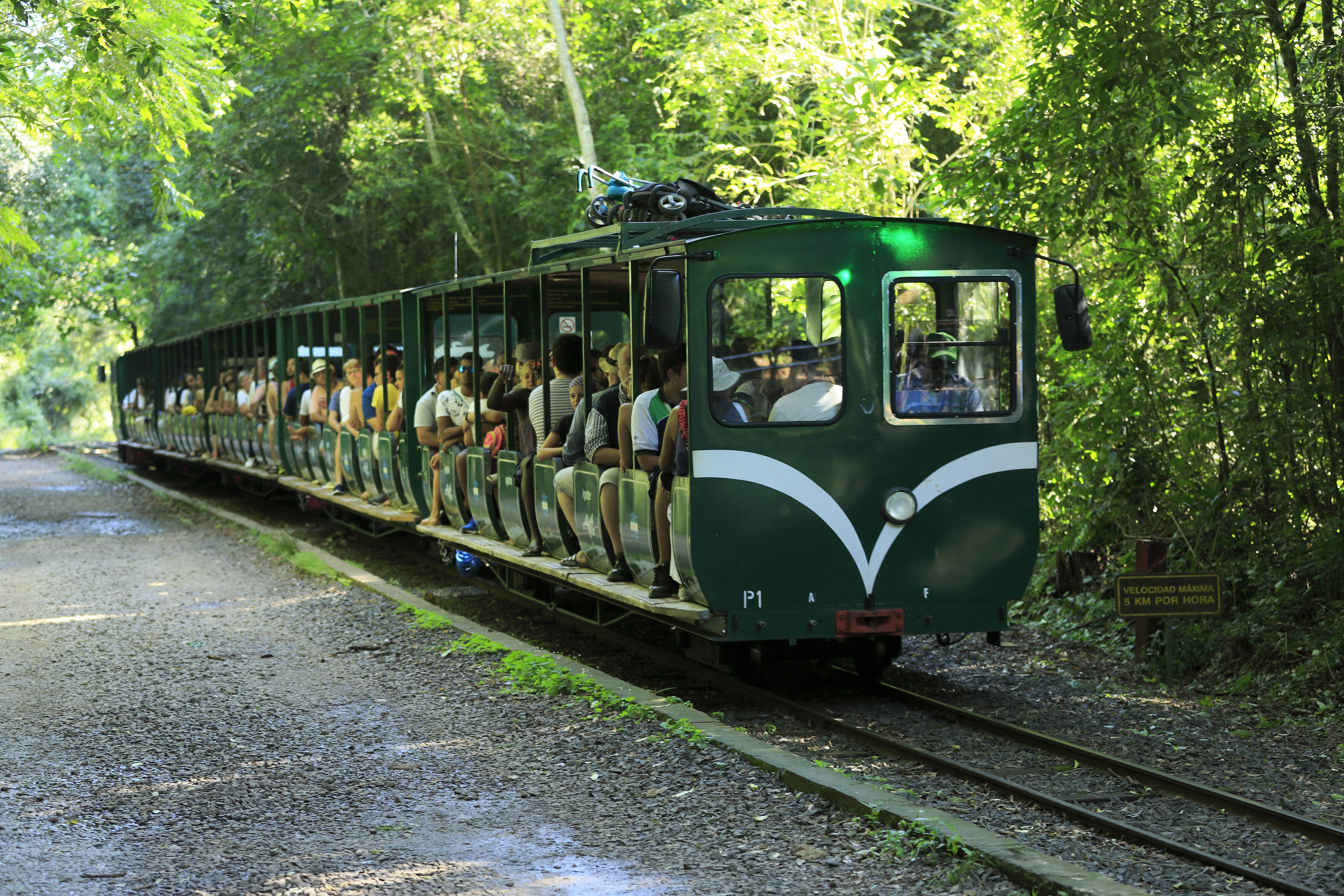
- The train in 2018

Overview
- Service type: Light
- Status: Active
- Locale: Iguazú National Park, Misiones Province
- First service: 1995; 30 years ago
- Current operator: Iguazú Argentina

Route
- Termini: Central; Garganta del Diablo
- Stops: 1
- Distance travelled: 7 km
- Average journey time: 20'

Technical
- Track gauge: 600 mm (1 ft 11 5/8 in)
- Track owner: Iguazú National Park
Route map
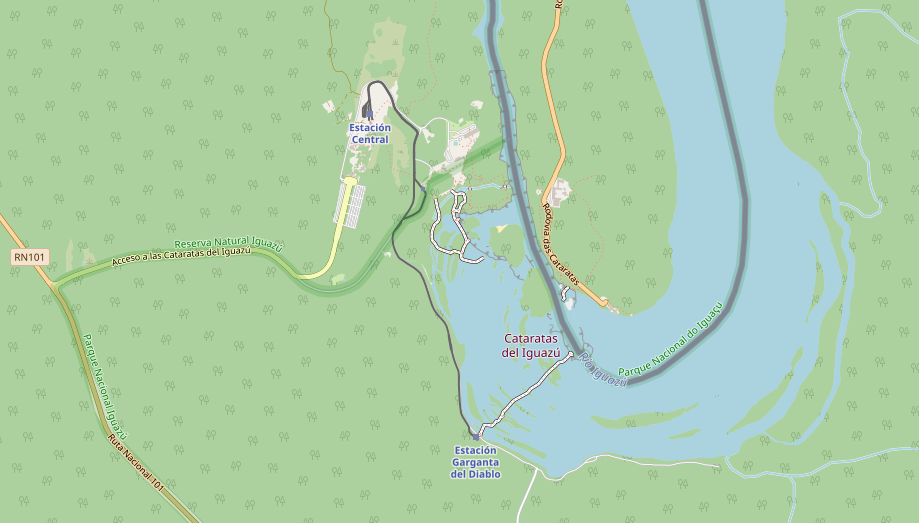

The Rainforest Ecological Train or Waterfalls Train (Tren Ecológico de la Selva or Tren de las Cataratas) is a 600 mm (1 ft 11 5/8 in) narrow gauge train that runs through the forest inside Iguazú National Park in the north of the province of Misiones of Argentina.

The line is 7 kilometres (4.3 mi) long and was built using rail track by French manufacturer Decauville.

== Characteristics ==
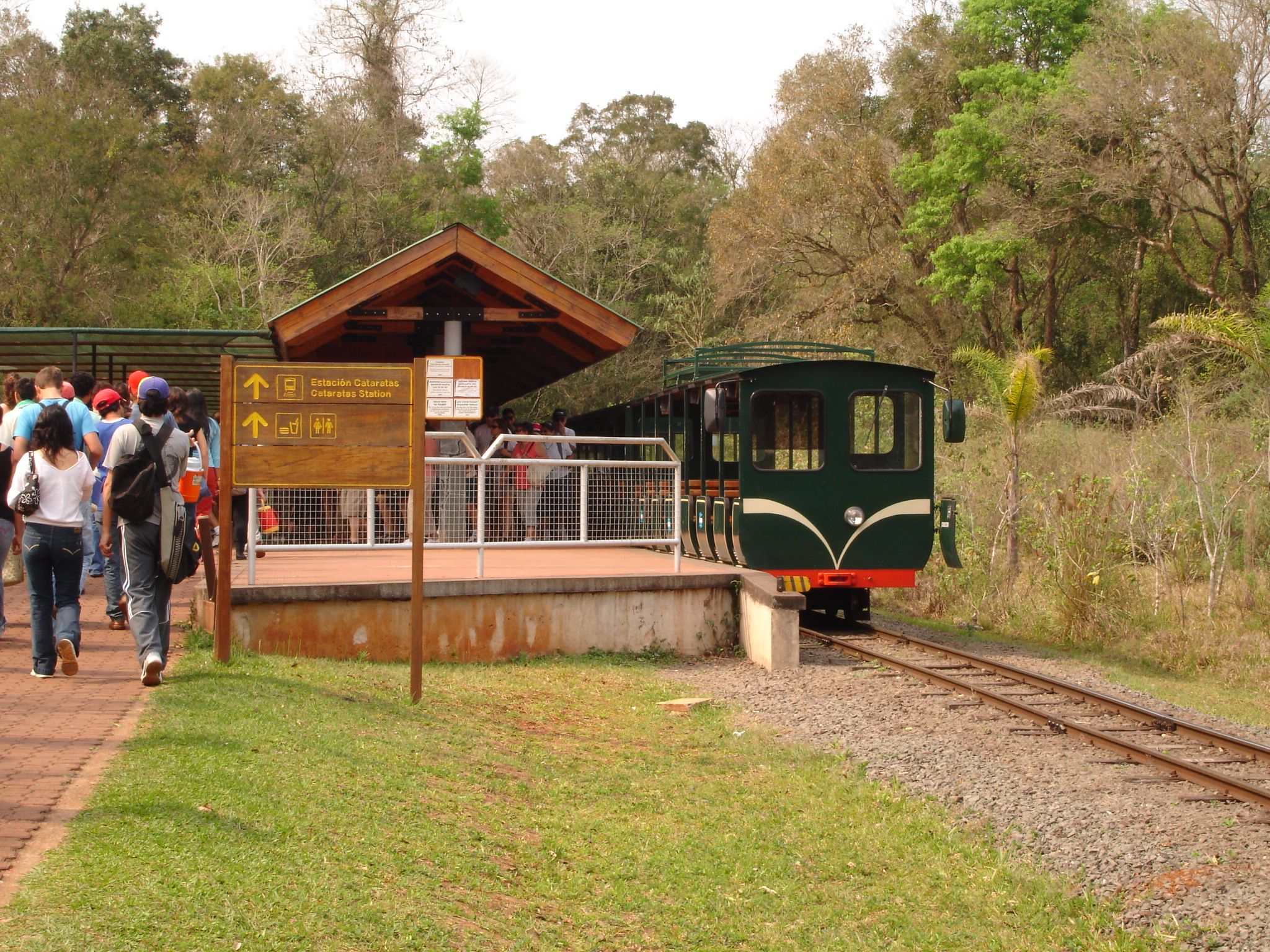
The train at Cataratas station

The train can transport up to 150 passengers over 7 kilometres (4.3 mi) of track from the Visitors’ Centre to Cataratas (Waterfalls) Station and Garganta del Diablo (Devil's Gorge) Station. It carries approximately 900,000 visitors yearly.

The train was built in England by Alan Keef Ltd, in Ross-on-Wye. It is painted green and the propane-fired locomotive pulls up to five opened-roofed carriages with wooden seats at the sides so that the passengers can view the forest.

The tracks run along the Iguazu River and the train runs at speeds of up to 20 kilometres per hour (12 mph), stopping when animals cross the lines. The journey takes about 20 minutes. From Garganta del Diablo (Devil's Gorge) Station visitors can go to a viewing platform built on the edge of the huge waterfall 90 metres (300 ft) high called Garganta del Diablo.

== Stations ==
- Central: main terminal with a commercial area, restrooms, first-aid room and Park Ranger offices.
- Cataratas (Waterfalls): a square, lounge area, fast food services and restrooms. Pathways to the Lower and Upper Circuits.
- Garganta (Devil's Gorge): a square, restrooms and fast food premises. The Garganta del Diablo walkway leads to viewing platforms built over the lip of the waterfall. Oct 2023 floods destroyed many of the walkways and as of 2024, the train is not running to Garganta due to the closure of the walkway to Garganta del Diablo.

== See also ==
- Iguazú National Park
- Iguazú Falls
- List of heritage railways
