= Sun Channel =

Venezuelan television channel

Sun Channel Tourism Television
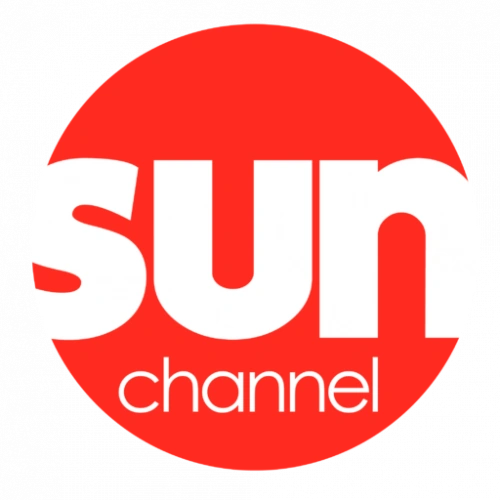
- Country: Venezuela
- Broadcast area: Latin America
- Headquarters: Caracas

Programming
- Picture format: 1080i HDTV (downscaled to 480i/576i for the SD feed)

History
- Launched: October 24, 2007

Links
- Website: sunchanneltv.com

Sun Channel (previously Sun Channel Tourism Television) is a cable TV channel based in Venezuela. It offers entertainment and informational programming mostly related to travel and tourism, also covering gastronomy, culture, and fashion.

Sun Channel Tourism Television can be viewed in most American counties and some European countries.
