= Waterford Bus Station =

Bus station in Waterford, Ireland

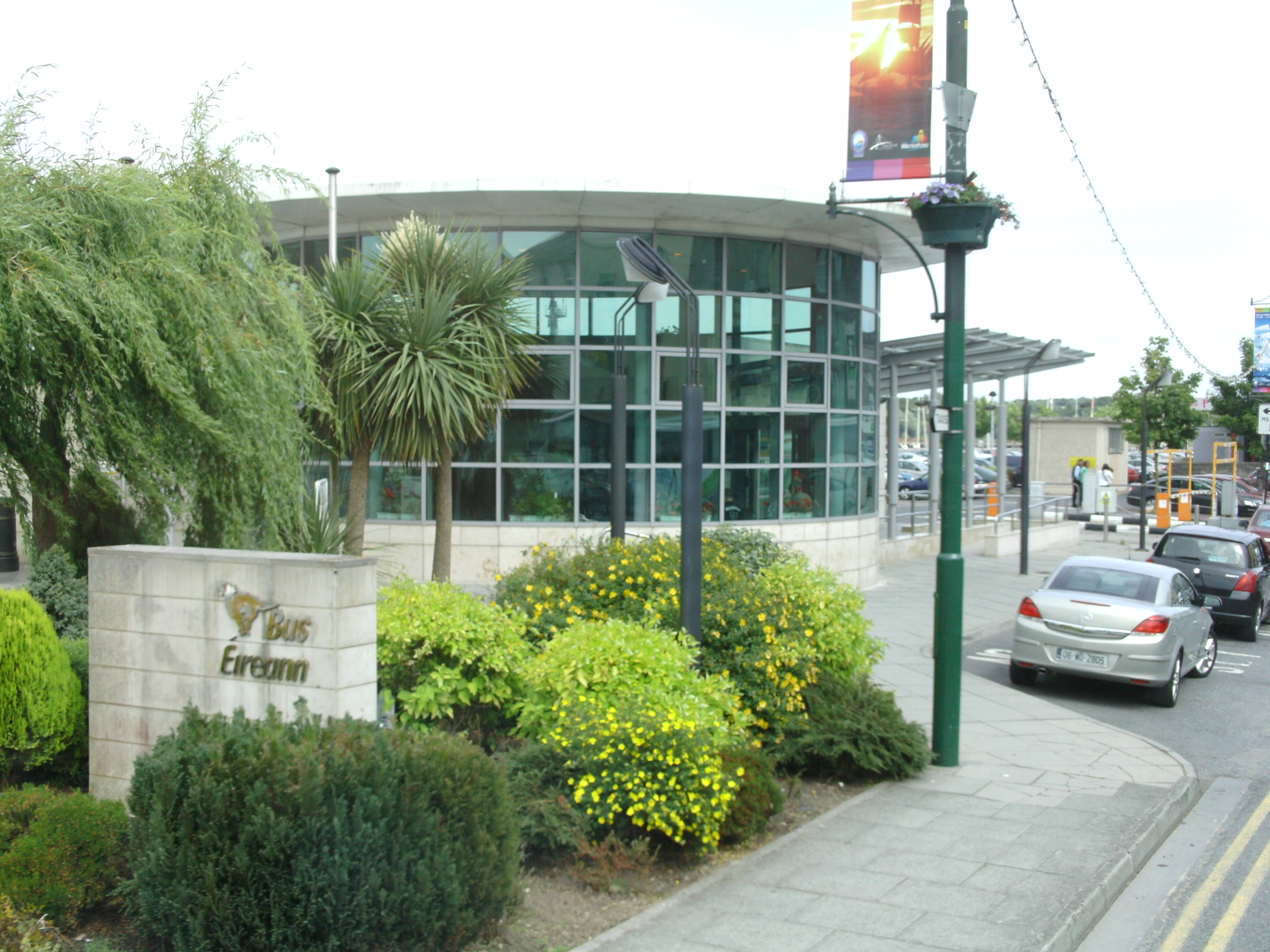

General information
- Location: Quay, Waterford
- Coordinates: 52.2631°N 7.1155°W
- Bus stands: 16
- Bus operators: Bus Éireann
- Connections: Waterford railway station (5 minute walk)

History
- Opened: 1987
Location

Waterford Bus Station serves the city of Waterford in the south-east of Ireland. It is situated on the quay in Waterford. It was opened in 1987 and redeveloped in 2000.

There are 16 stands for buses. The station has a shop, travel centre, security offices, toilets and ticket desk and machines. The bus station is used by Bus Éireann for regional services mainly although some city centre services depart from the station. Most city centre buses depart from the Clock Tower bus stop beside the station. At night buses do not stay at the station as it is a very open area and buses go to a depot in the city.

== Gallery ==
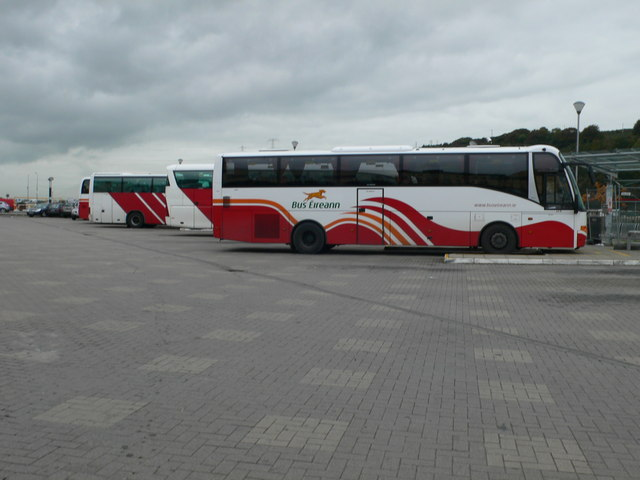
Buses at stand

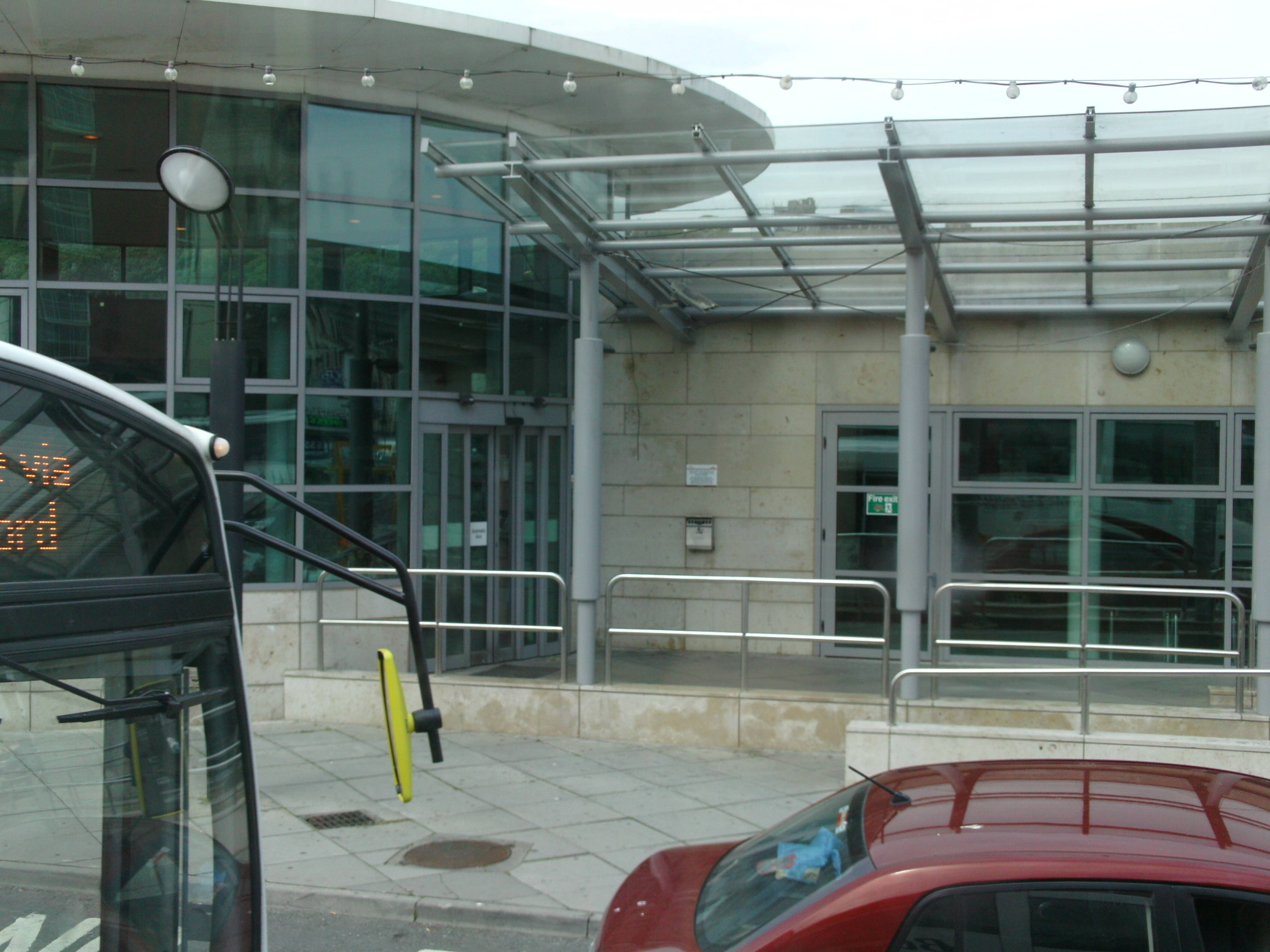
Entrance to the bus station

== See also ==
- Bus Éireann
- Transport 21
