= Hillview, Waterford =

Housing estate in Waterford, Ireland

Hillview is a housing estate in Waterford, Ireland. The entrance to Hillview is centered on the Roanmore/De La Salle GAA pitches and Kyle Curran park; the latter being named after an 8-year-old child from Hillview who was murdered in 1987. Hillview (Oakwood) is served by Bus Éireann route W5.

In 2012, an investigation was carried out into two incidents in which gun shots were discharged in the housing estate.
