= Ballybeg, Waterford =

Ballybeg Baile Beag
- Suburb
- Location within Ireland
- Coordinates: 52.2394°N 7.1433°W
- Country: Ireland
- Province: Munster
- County: Waterford

Ballybeg (Irish: Baile Beag) is a largely working class district in Waterford, Ireland. The area consists of four council housing estates - Ballybeg, Priory Lawn, Clonard Park and Ardmore Park, and a private housing estate, Glencarra.

As of 2007, the community was reported as being "approximately 750 houses". The community was originally created to provide low-income housing.

== Location and access ==
Ballybeg is accessed via the N25 junction outside the (now defunct) 'Waterford Crystal' factory, the N25 junction past the 'Cartamundi' (formerly Hasbro) games factory, and the Ballybeg Link Road off the Kilbarry road.

The area of Ballybeg is situated within the wider Kilbarry area. This area was reputedly home to a priory of the Knights Templar and later became the Irishtown of Waterford. Many cities and large towns in Ireland have an area called Baile Beag (Small town) Baile Bocht (Poor town) i.e. Ballybough (pronounced 'Ballybock') in Dublin, Ceathrú Rua (Red-haired area) or simply "Irish Town".

== Amenities ==
Ballybeg is served by a church (St. Saviour's), a primary school (St. Saviour's National School), two supermarkets, a takeaway, and a parish centre / sports hall. It also has several sporting organisations, including a Gaelic Athletic Association club, a boxing club, as well as being near to the Waterford Crystal "sports and social" centre, several soccer clubs and Waterford City Rugby Club. There is also youth centre in the area.
