= Rick Stein's Cornwall =

British food lifestyle TV series (2021-23)

- Directed by: Matt Bennett
- Presented by: Rick Stein
- Country of origin: United Kingdom
- Original language: English
- No. of series: 3
- No. of episodes: 40

Production
- Executive producers: Tom Hutchings; Matt Bennett
- Running time: UK: 30 mins
- Production companies: Shine TV; Rick Stein Productions

Original release
- Network: BBC Two
- Release: 4 January 2021 – 24 February 2023

Rick Stein's Cornwall is a British food lifestyle series which was first broadcast on BBC Two in January 2021. In each half-hour episode, chef Rick Stein journeys through his home county of Cornwall, meeting suppliers, taking in the history, music, art and culture as well as trying local dishes. The second series aired in January 2022. Series three aired in February 2023.

== Production ==
Rick Stein's Cornwall was commissioned on 17 August 2020 by the BBC is a Rick Stein Productions and Shine TV production for BBC Two. This marked the departure from using Denham Productions, who had made many of Stein's televisions series. Filming for the series took place during September and October 2020.

== Episodes ==
=== Series 1 (2021) ===
No. overall	No. in series	Title	Original release date
1	1–01	"Series 1 Episode 1"	4 January 2021
Stein visits the Polventon, the house his father and uncle built in the 1930s where he spent many summer holidays. In West Penwith, Stein visits renowned artist Kurt Jackson. Tresillian House to see an apple orchard growing rare apple varieties. At the orchard, he makes an apple Charlotte dessert.
2	1–02	"Series 1 Episode 2"	5 January 2021
After visiting a family making Cornish Gouda cheese, Stein makes Cornish Gouda and apple quesadillas with Pico de gallo. Stein visits the fishing port of Mevagissey, which once had a thriving pilchard (sardine) fishing industry.
3	1–03	"Series 1 Episode 3"	6 January 2021
Stein travels to Coombeshead Farm in Launceston to meet chef Tom Adams, who breeds Mangalica pigs and grows organic vegetables that he uses in his restaurant. Stein cooks pork with Blackthorn sloe berry sauce. Visits Penzance. Visits Rock to buy oysters. Back in Padstow, Rick and his son Jack cook a seafood bake on the beach.
4	1–04	"Series 1 Episode 4"	7 January 2021
In Porthilly, Stein visits Tim Marshall's oyster farm. In Launceston, Stein visits its castle and St. Mary Magdalene Church. After travelling to Land's End to meet musicians Graham Fitkin and Ruth Wall, Stein cooks Cornish mussels with cider.
5	1–05	"Series 1 Episode 5"	8 January 2021
Stein goes crab fishing or "Crabbing". Cooks crab omelette. Later, Barry Humphries retells the events to Stein of his near-death experience, when in 1961 he slipped on some ice and fell over a cliff near Zennor and had to rescued by helicopter. They visit the grave of Sir John Betjeman at St Enodoc Church in Trebetherick. Stein joins the Perranporth Cold Water Swimmers for a cold water swim.
6	1–06	"Series 1 Episode 6"	11 January 2021
Rick visits the Camel Valley Vineyard to taste their award-winning wine. Rick goes mackerel fishing off the Padstow coast. Rick cooks Goan recheado mackerel curry, inspired by a trip he made to Goa.
7	1–07	"Series 1 Episode 7"	12 January 2021
Stein takes a boat ride along the Fowey Estuary to learn about its history; afterwards, in Fowey, he enjoys a local favourite — crab Scotch egg. After visiting St Catherine's Castle, Stein travels to Colwith Farm in Lanlivery, whose owners are making vodka from potatoes they grow. Later, he makes vodka-drizzle pancakes served with a blackberry compot and Cornish clotted cream. Near Truro, Rick samples local meat and vegetables at Nancarrow Farm's Feast Night.
8	1–08	"Series 1 Episode 8"	13 January 2021
Stein meets his former protégé Nathan Outlaw, at his two-Michelin-starred restaurant in the village of Port Issac. The pair go lobster fishing off the coast of Port Issac, and later, Stein makes a lobster risotto. Stein visits another of his former chefs – Ross Geach, owner of Padstow Kitchen Garden. Stein uses some vegetables from chef Geach's garden to make a Briam — a type of Greek vegetable casserole, that he cooks at Tresillian House near St Newlyn East.
9	1–09	"Series 1 Episode 9"	14 January 2021
After taking the ferry across the Tamar, Stein travels to Liskeard's Golitha Falls, to meet Dawn French, who moved to Cornwall from London in 2006. Later, Stein visits Cornwall's first Buckthorn berry orchard; the berries (also known as seaberries) are said to be a superfood. Afterwards, Stein cooks duck with a sea buckthorn sauce.
10	1–10	"Series 1 Episode 10"	15 January 2021
Stein visits St Austell china clay pit. Later, Stein cooks a fennel and sea bass dish. Stein creates a dessert of pears poached in red wine and blackberries. In the seaside town of Newlyn, Stein visits his niece Lucy who is an artist and enjoys painting the picturesque local scenery; later they visit Boscawen-Un – a Bronze Age stone circle that dates back to between 2500 and 1500 BC.
11	1–11	"Series 1 Episode 11"	18 January 2021
In St. Ives, Stein sees firsthand why the area has been popular with leading artists such as Barbara Hepworth and Terry Frost. After a fishing trip for red mullet, Stein cooks red mullet with sliced roast potatoes and a black olive tapenade. At Land's End, Stein learns about the conservation work going on to protect red-billed choughs; especially important because they feature on the Cornish coat of arms.
12	1–12	"Series 1 Episode 12"	19 January 2021
In the Roseland peninsula, Stein visits St Just's Church. Later, he travels to St Mawes to meet hoteliers Olga and Alex Polizzi, before enjoying a meal of duck breast with rosti and roasted beetroot with red wine due. Stein visits Philip Warren Butchers in Launceston, who specalises in dry-aged meat, afterwards he makes ribeye steak with bearnaise sauce. In the harbourside village of Mousehole, Rick meets Irish studio potter and author Jack Doherty, who finds inspiration in the Cornish landscape.
13	1–13	"Series 1 Episode 13"	20 January 2021
Stein visits Tintagel Castle, the supposed birthplace of King Arthur. Travelling inland, Stein visits the town of Camborne, that is best known as a centre for the former Cornish tin and copper mining industry. Afterwards, he makes saffron buns. Stein travels to the Roseland Peninsula to meet The Cornish Saffron Company owners Brian and Margaret Eyers and to see first-hand how saffron is grown, picked, and processed.
14	1–14	"Series 1 Episode 14"	21 January 2021
After going for a swim at Lamorna Cove, Stein travels to Botallack, west Cornwall to see its famed Crowns engine houses. After having a Cornish pasty in St Just, Stein visits Chûn Quoit. Rick meets author Patrick Gale, who wrote Notes from an Exhibition. Later, Stein makes a Cornish bouillabaisse made with gurnard, langoustines & mussels.
15	1–15	"Series 1 Episode 15"	22 January 2021
Rick travels to Truro, the county's only city and visits Truro Cathedral. Just outside Truro, at Nancarrow Farm, Rick cooks butterflied lamb with rosemary and thyme. Later, he travels to an organic farm whose family is passionate about offal. At the rugged Morwenstow coast, Rick recalls the story of clergyman Robert Hawker who gave Christian burials to shipwrecked seamen washed up on the shores of the parish. Rick visits Hawker's Hut, the National Trust's smallest property.

=== Series 2 (2022) ===
No. overall	No. in series	Title	Original release date
16	2–01	"Series 2 Episode 1"	3 January 2022
Rick Stein reminisces about how he opened his first restaurant before he takesl a bracing dip in Bude's Sea Pool. Then Rick heads to the waters nears Sennen Cove to learn about the ancient fishing method of handlining. Afterwards, Rick makes a fish pie for John Harris, head gardener of Tresillian House.
17	2–02	"Series 2 Episode 2"	4 January 2022
Rick travels to St Ives to learn more about one of Britain's least-known artists, Alfred Wallis. After visiting a farm on the Cornwall border with Devon, he makes a French lamb stew called a Navarin. Rick visits St Neot's Church to see its medieval stained glass windows and to take part in the village's annual Oak Apple Day parade.
18	2–03	"Series 2 Episode 3"	5 January 2022
Rick takes a walk with Springwatch presenter and biologist Gillian Burke in Tremayne Woods, an Atlantic temperate rainforest along the banks of the Helford River. Rick then visits a husband-and-wife team producing Cornish charcuterie, before making high tea with ham and vegetables.
19	2–04	"Series 2 Episode 4"	6 January 2022
Rick recalls the old Cornish folk tale of the Mermaid of Zennor, he then travel to the coast to see how edible seaweed is harvested. After cooking Gurnard with parsley, garlic and sea and land spaghetti, he heads to the banger-and-stock car raceway in Redruth. Rick makes his way to Bodmin Moor to meet a blacksmith making knives from old vehicles.
20	2–05	"Series 2 Episode 5"	7 January 2022
After meeting Cornish artist Sue Read, Rick visits the fishing port of Mousehole where he follows in the footsteps of poet Dylan Thomas, he then makes the Cornish dish of Stargazy pie. Rick delves into novelist Thomas Hardy's life after he moved to North Cornwall.
21	2–06	"Series 2 Episode 6"	10 January 2022
After catching some crab of the coast of newquay, Rick makes a Cornish King Crab Salad. Afterwards, he heads inland to Bodmin Moor to see Robin Hanbury-Tenison and his son's rewilding project to introduced a pair of wild beavers to the local countryside.
22	2–07	"Series 2 Episode 7"	11 January 2022
Rick travels to the Isles of Scilly to meet a man who makes lobster pots by hand, the traditional way. Rick retells the events of the Scilly naval disaster of 1707, when four Royal Navy warships were lost in a savage storm off the Isles of Scilly. At Tresco Abbey Gardens, Rick meets a beekeeper trying to introduce a native Scillonian honeybee that can copy with the Isles' harsh weather and will produce more honey. This inspires Rick to make a steamed sponge pudding with honey butterscotch sauce.
23	2–08	"Series 2 Episode 8"	12 January 2022
Rick visits the Davidstow cheese factory to how they make their cheese, afterwards, he discusses cheese with Head Cheese Grader – Mark Pitts-Tucker. Rick makes cheese and chive scones served with pear, cheese, and honey. Later, he travels to the seaside town of Newlyn which has inspired painters like Forbes and Langley for many years.
24	2–09	"Series 2 Episode 9"	13 January 2022
Rick is at the port of Falmouth, where he discovers it is still very busy today. Later, he visits the home of Nobel Prize-winning British author William Golding, who wrote Lord of the Flies. Travelling inland, he meets Andy Tuck, who cooks almost everything over wood. In Hellandbridge on the banks of the River Camel, Rick catches up with his old friend—potter Paul Jackson.
25	2–10	"Series 2 Episode 10"	14 January 2022
Rick goes in search of edible plants with a professional forager along the banks of the River Camel. Back at Tresillian House, Rick makes Greek Horta pie made with foraged greens. At St Ives, long-time fish supplier Matthew Stevens and Rick reminisce how the town has changed since the influx of tourists. In Roche, Rick and Cornish actor Ed Rowe discuss the problem of second home ownership on Cornish communities.
26	2–11	"Series 2 Episode 11"	17 January 2022
Rick travels to Carrick Roads, the estuary of the River Fal where he joins a team diving for razor clams. Later, he cooks grilled razor clams with breadcrumbs, tomato, garlic, chilli and parsley, served with a salad of seaweed and lettuce. At the end of Newlyn Pier, Rick visits a tidal observatory that was responsible for determining the mean sea level. After a visit to Penlee Museum where he is shown items made a century ago by fishermen using Cornish copper, Rick meets metal worker Michael Johnson who is bringing copperwork back to the Newlyn.
27	2–12	"Series 2 Episode 12"	18 January 2022
At Land's End, Rick meets painter Kurt Jackson who is inspired by Turner's Cornish paintings. At Newlyn, Rick see how the fish market has adapted to modern times with the introduction of online auctions. Back at Tresillian House, he cooks Grillade of monkfish with roasted red pepper sauce and olive oil mash. At Caerhays Castle, Rick sees some of its many different varieties of Magnolias, and learns how some have come as far as China.
28	2–13	"Series 2 Episode 13"	19 January 2022
Rick travels to Pentillie Castle to see former owner Sir James Tillie's mausoleum. After a bracing swim in the River Tamar, he meets chef Emily Scott, who recreates the Turbot dish she made for President Joe Biden at the 2021 G7 summit. Rick visits his asparagus supplier who shows him how the vegetable is cultivated, later he makes a Vegetable melange with beurre blanc. Later, at Gwithian Beach, he meets the founder of The Wave Project, a charity that uses surf therapy to help children and young people with mental health problems.
29	2–14	"Series 2 Episode 14"	20 January 2022
In Looe, Rick learns about the raids by Barbary pirates that enslaved thousands of people from Britain's coastal communities. After joining a fishing boat off St Mawes, Rick makes warm sole salad with tomato, avocado and basil. In Newlyn, he meets two chefs. Rick travels to the coastal village of Porthpean to meet composer and musician Harriet Petherick Bushman.
30	2–15	"Series 2 Episode 15"	21 January 2022
In the final episode of the series, Rick travels to Whitsand Bay to meet Lisa Woollett, a photographer and beachcomber who has found some remarkable items on some of the county's beaches. In Bude, he sees a remarkable set of vintage photographs that capture the local area. Later, Rick visits a mine to learn about the origins of the Cornish pasty. Back at Tresillian House, Rick makes traditional Cornish pasties.

=== Series 3 (2023) ===
No. overall	No. in series	Title	Original release date
31	3–01	"Series 3 Episode 1"	13 February 2023
Rick Stein is back on the road in Cornwall, discovering more of the county's best produce. In this episode, Rick visits a couple who make goat milk cheese. Afterwards, Rick makes twice-baked goats' cheese and thyme soufflés. Rick takes his son, Jack to Bodmin Moor to visit the Charlotte Dymond Memorial which marks the scene where Dymond was murdered in 1844. They also visit St Nonna's Church, where Rick used to visit with his parents. Finally, they enjoy a meal at a local pub which is run by one of Rick's former chefs.
32	3–02	"Series 3 Episode 2"	14 February 2023
Rick re-visits a cider farm that was featured in his series Food Heroes; which is now run by the author Raynor Winn and her husband. Later, Rick makes Chicken, leek and cider gratin for lunch. After visiting Little Dennis Fort, Rick explores Falmouth and experiences Sea shanty singing.
33	3–03	"Series 3 Episode 3"	15 February 2023
In Tregothnan, Rick visits England's only tea plantation, which inspires him to make fruited tea loaf and plum compote. After a swim at Jubilee Pool in Penzance, Rick delves into Charles Dickens’s time in West Cornwall.
34	3–04	"Series 3 Episode 4"	16 February 2023
After exploring the atmospheric ruins of the ancient village of Carn Euny, Rick visits a cattle market in Truro. For lunch, Rick makes steak and kidney pudding. Off the Falmouth coast, Rick enjoys a ride in a handbuilt replica pilot cutter.
35	3–05	"Series 3 Episode 5"	17 February 2023
Rick heads to the Fal estuary, where he joins fishermen catching Cornish Oysters. Later, he visits Falmouth Art Gallery which houses a collection of paintings from artist Charles Napier Hemy. Rick makes the Scottish soup - Cullen skink with wholemeal soda bread. And in Cornwall’s former capital of Lostwithiel, Rick learns more about the history of the town.
36	3–06	"Series 3 Episode 6"	20 February 2023
Hannah Woodman British landscape painter chats with Rick about how Cornwall inspires her paintings. Later, he visits a family-run farm that has 600 Red deer. Rick makes a Venison Wellington with prosciutto and chestnut mushroom duxelle. Cornish comedian Johnny Cowling talks to Rick about living and working in Cornwall.
37	3–07	"Series 3 Episode 7"	21 February 2023
After cooking Shakshouka, Rick takes the ferry across the River Fal to see the Organic vegetables being grown at Soul Farm in Falmouth. Back in the kitchen, Rick makes a Radicchio and Red onion tart. In St Merryn, Rick shares his memories of his friendship with the Oscar-winning composer Sir Malcolm Arnold.
38	3–08	"Series 3 Episode 8"	22 February 2023
Rick visits a Basset Mine, one of many that were vital for the local economy. In St Ives, Rick is shown by the owners of Howl & Loer how they grow the botanicals that go into their spirits. Later, he makes a Platinum Pudding infused with hogweed spirit. Rick travels to St Breage's Church to see its set of five medieval wall paintings.
39	3–09	"Series 3 Episode 9"	23 February 2023
After visiting potter Catherine Lucktaylor in west Penwith, Rick makes steamed sea bass with garlic, ginger and spring onions. In Saint Austell, Rick and his son Charlie sample Cornish wine at the Knightor Winery. In Launceston, Rick meets author Patrick Gale to learn more about poet Charles Causley.
40	3–10	"Series 3 Episode 10"	24 February 2023
Rick enjoys some local seafood in Boscastle, before visiting Minster Church. Just outside Bude, Rick visits Cornwall's only organic mushroom farm. Afterwards, he makes mushroom and broccoli stir fry. In Mousehole, Rick visits the set of the long-running German television series Rosamunde Pilcher.
