= Ferdinando Bennet =

English cricketer

Personal information
- Full name: Ferdinando Wallis Bennet
- Born: 13 December 1850; St Newlyn East, Cornwall
- Died: 17 October 1929 (aged 78); Northam, Devon
- Batting: Right-handed
- Bowling: Right-arm slow
- Source: Cricinfo, 8 March 2017

Lieutenant-Colonel Ferdinando Wallis Bennet (13 December 1850 – 17 October 1929) was an English soldier who played in four first-class cricket matches between 1874 and 1878.

Bennet was born at Tresillian House near St Newlyn East in Cornwall in 1850. He went to Sherborne School before attending the Royal Military Academy, Sandhurst. He was commissioned in the Royal Engineers, rising to the rank of Lieutenant-Colonel, brevetted to Colonel, at the end of his military career. As a Lieutenant he was British Vice-Consul of Anatolia based in Adana between 1880 and 1882.

Bennet played in four first-class cricket matches between 1874 and 1878. He played three matches in 1874, once for each of Kent, Gentlemen of the South, and a combined Kent and Gloucestershire team. In 1878, he made one appearance for Marylebone Cricket Club (MCC).

Bennet married Evelyn Palmer and was a JP in Devon in later life. He died in Northam, Devon in 1929 aged 78.

== Bibliography ==
- Carlaw, Derek (2020). Kent County Cricketers, A to Z: Part One (1806–1914) (PDF). Cardiff: ACS.
