= Benny Halt railway station =

Coordinates: 50.3757°N 5.0411°W

Benny Halt railway station is a halt on the Lappa Valley railway. The station was originally part of a tramway before being transformed into a steam railway attraction.

The station is on the opening branch which takes customers and passengers from the entrance to the centre of the park. (EAST WHEAL ROSE)

The branch uses steam locomotives either Muffin or Zebedee.

== Route ==
Preceding station	Heritage railways	Following station
East Wheal Rose	Benny Halt Branch	Terminus
