= Jack Doherty (potter) =

Northern Irish studio potter and author

- Born: 1948 (age 77–78); Coleraine, Northern Ireland
- Education: Ulster College of Art and Design
- Employer: Doherty Porcelain
- Known for: Pottery, author
- Website: www.dohertyporcelain.com

Jack Doherty (born 1948, Coleraine) is a Northern Irish studio potter and author. He is perhaps best known for his vessels made of soda-fired porcelain. He has been featured in a number of books, and his work has been exhibited widely in both Europe and North America. Articles of his have appeared in various pottery journals and he has been Chair of the Craft Potters Association.

== Biography ==
Upon graduating from the Ulster College of Art and Design in 1971, Jack Doherty began working as a studio potter at Kilkenny Design Workshops, Ireland. Afterwards, he established his studio first in County Armagh and then in Herefordshire, while also being a part-time lecturer in ceramics at the Royal Forest of Dean College. He was elected as chair of the Craft Potters Association between 1995 and 2000 and again between 2002 and 2008. He was lead potter and creative director at the Leach Pottery in St. Ives, Cornwall, where he developed Leach's new range of contemporary tableware. In 2012, Doherty exhibited alongside Japanese potter Tomoo Hamada, celebrating the signing of an official declaration of friendship between the towns of St. Ives and Mashiko, Tochigi, Japan, by the two respective mayors on 20 September 2012. As a founder he became the current Chair of the organising committee of Ceramic Arts London in 2013, previously being director of both Ceramic Review magazine and Contemporary Ceramics for more than 13 years. He now works independently from his studio in Mousehole, Cornwall, England. He was visited by Rick Stein in the first series of the BBC's Rick Stein's Cornwall.

== Work process ==
Devoting the majority of his career to porcelain, Doherty has developed a unique process of crafting his ceramic objects. The shapes are thrown, then carved and shaped using only one type of porcelain clay. One slip in which copper carbonate is added as a colouring material is applied. Finally, he uses a single soda-firing technique, executed by spraying a mixture of water and sodium bicarbonate into the kiln at a high temperature. The resulting vapour is drawn through the kiln chamber where it reacts with the silica and alumina present in the clay, creating a rich patina of surface texture and colour.

=== Questioning the vernacular of functionality ===
Doherty's work is meant to subtly interconnect with domestic space and daily life, and according to Doherty, "can be solitary and contemplative or ceremonial; for everyday use or for special occasions." His recent work displays a sense of robustness, lacking the refined transparent glaze commonly associated with porcelain objects. In using the soda-firing finish and a wide range of archetypal forms, Doherty attempts to question the vernacular of functionality. The vessels Doherty creates explore ancient layers of cultural resonance embedded in these archetypal forms. Looking at the rustic surface textures, the palettes of smoky and sometimes vibrant colours and the simplicity of the irregular shapes thrown by Doherty, the vessels exhume transient visceral qualities reminiscent of the Japanese aesthetics of Wabi-sabi and Shibui, no doubt having been influenced by the work of the late modernist Bernard Leach (Doherty being the previous lead potter of The Leach Pottery), as well as the politics of work as laid out by John Ruskin. Vernacularism as a cultural phenomenon thus plays a large part in the work of Doherty, and it can, therefore, be seen as a product of the Arts and Crafts movement and, associated with it, the writings of William Morris.

== Selected awards ==
- 2009 The Crafts Council of Ireland Bursary Award
- 2007 Seeded, Sculpture in Context Award Winner
- 2006 Borderland, Cast Award, Sculpture in Context
- 1998 1st Prize West Midlands Arts Touring Exhibition
- 1993 West Midlands Arts Crafts initiative grant
- 1986 Crafts Council marketing / publicity grant
- 1976 Gold Medal International Ceramics Biennial, Vallauris, France
- 1974 Gold Medal International Ceramics Exhibition, Faenza, Italy

== Selected exhibitions ==
=== Solo exhibitions ===
- 2012 Jack Doherty and Tomoo Hamada, Gallery St Ives, Tokyo, Japan
- 2012 A Place in the World, Garden House, Cornwall, United Kingdom
- 2010 Solo Exhibition, National Taipei University of Education, Taiwan

=== Group exhibitions and fairs ===
- 2013 Future Beauty?, National Craft Gallery, Kilkenny, Ireland
- 2012 The Ethics of Objects, Kinsale Arts Festival, County Cork, Vessels, Cill Rialaig Arts Centre, County Kerry, Irish Craft Portfolio, RHA, Dublin, Ceramic Art London, Royal College of Art, London, United Kingdom
- 2011 Talking in Clay, Courtyard Arts Centre, Hereford, United Kingdom, Art Fair Tokyo, Japan, Irish Craft Portfolio, RHA, Dublin, transFORM, Farmleigh Gallery, Dublin and Millennium Court Arts Centre, County Armagh, COLLECT, Saatchi Gallery, London, United Kingdom, Irish Craft Portfolio, National Craft Gallery, Kilkenny, A Place in the World, Newlyn Art Gallery, Cornwall, UK, Through Fifty, CCC, London, UK
- 2010 Tea Ceremony Pots, Mitzukoshi Gallery, Tokyo, Japan, European Ceramics Context, Denmark

== Collections ==
- National Museum of Ireland
- Museum of Liverpool, United Kingdom
- Cheltenham Art Gallery & Museum, United Kingdom
- Princessehof Ceramics Museum, Netherlands
- The Potteries Museum & Art Gallery, Stoke-on-Trent, United Kingdom

== Publications ==
- Porcelain by Jack Doherty, published by University of Pennsylvania Press, 2002, ISBN 978-0-8122-1827-5

== Articles and references in other publications ==
- 2013 "Troubled Light", Eleanor Flegg, Ceramic Review
- 2012 "Talking Quietly Hearing Silence", Eleanor Flegg, Craft Arts International
- 2011 "The Craft and Art of Clay", Susan Peterson
- 2010 "Jack Doherty", Interiors Magazine, Taiwan, "Jack Doherty Pure Simplicity", Ceramics Art Magazine, Taiwan, "Jack Doherty", China Post, Taiwan, "Accidentally on Purpose", Taipei Times Taiwan
- 2009 Ceramics Ireland, Tina Byrne, "Jack Doherty", Eleanor Flegg, Perspectives
- 2008 "Brightness and Rightness", Helen Bevis, Ceramics Monthly
- 2007 "Revelations", David Whiting, Ceramics Art and Perception
- 2006 "The Ceramics Book", Ceramic Review
- 2005 "The Teapot Book", Steve Woodhead, A&C Black
- 2004 "Contemporary Porcelain", Peter Lane, A&C Black, "Porcelain and Bone China", Sasha Wardell, Crowood Press
- 2003 "The Ceramic Surface", Osterman, A&C Black, National Ceramics, South Africa, "Complete Potters Companion", Tony Birks, Conran Octopus
- 2002 Ceramics Ireland, "Salt Glazed Ceramics", Phil Rogers, A&C Black
- 2001 "Salt-Glaze Ceramics", Rosemary Cochrane, Crowood Press
- 2000 "Ten Thousand Years of Pottery", Emmanuel Cooper, British Museum
- 1999 "Reputations", Anatol Orient, Ceramic Review
- 1998 "A Song of Today", Josie Walter, Ceramic Review
- 1995 "Colouring Clay", Clay Times, Washington DC
- 1994 "Porcelain", Caroline Whyman, Batsford
- 1993 "Soda Glazing", Ruthanne Tudball, A&C Black
- 1992 "Potters", Craft Potters Association
- 1991 "Dictionary of Practical Pottery" Robert Fournier
- 1990 "Colour in Clay", Jane Waller, Crowood Press
- 1989 "Potters Dictionary of Techniques and Materials", Hamer, A&C Black
- 1983 "Jack Doherty's Porcelain", Ceramic Review
- 1983 "Making a Tradition", Sean McCrum, Irish Times
- 1982 "The Crafts in Ulster", Peter Dormer, Crafts Magazine
