= Gil Stein =

Gil Stein may refer to:

- Gil Stein (archaeologist), American archaeologist and former director of the Oriental Institute at the University of Chicago
- Gil Stein (ice hockey) (1928–2022), former president of the National Hockey League

== See also ==
- Jill Stein (born 1950), US Green politician
- Jill Stein (restaurateur), British restaurateur for The Seafood Restaurant, and interior designer
