= East Wheal Rose railway station =

Railway station in Cornwall, England

East Wheal Rose
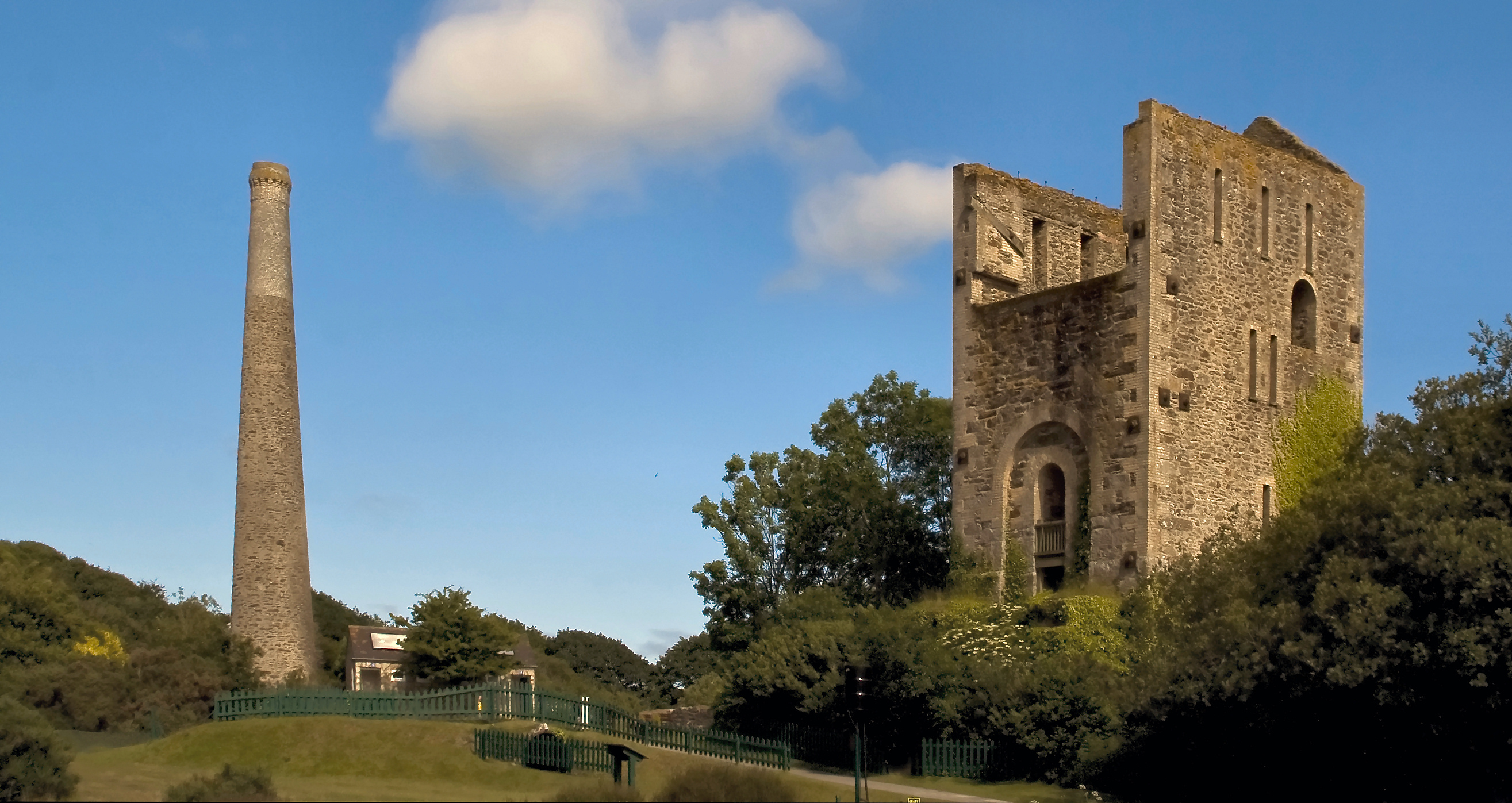

General information
- Location: Cornwall; England
- Coordinates: 50°21′44.19″N 5°2′27.65″W
- Elevation: 43 metres (141 ft)
- Platforms: Single platform station
- Tracks: 1
Cornwall
- {{{route_map}}}
Location

East Wheal Rose railway station is a station on the Lappa Valley Steam Railway in Cornwall, England.

== History ==
In 1849 Joseph Treffry opened a tramway from the East Wheal Rose mine to Newquay. The loading sidings were the first East Wheal Rose station.

It became a railway in 1874 when the tramway was taken over by the Cornwall Minerals Railway and steam locomotives replaced the horse-drawn wagons. The Great Western Railway took over the line in 1896 and expanded it as a branch line in 1905 from Newquay to Chacewater servicing the resorts of Perranporth and St Agnes and ran it until nationalisation in 1948.

British Railways ran the line until 4 February 1963 when the last train ran before the Beeching axe fell.

Ten years later, in 1973, Eric Booth bought a section of the old railway line and laid a narrow gauge railway along a section of it. He built it up into a popular tourist attraction with a play area for children at the East Wheal Rose site. East Wheal Rose Station came into being in 1974. It has been upgraded on a couple of occasions during its history with a new station building and new paving being laid. In 2014, Lappa Valley was sold to Keith and Sara Southwell.

== Gallery ==
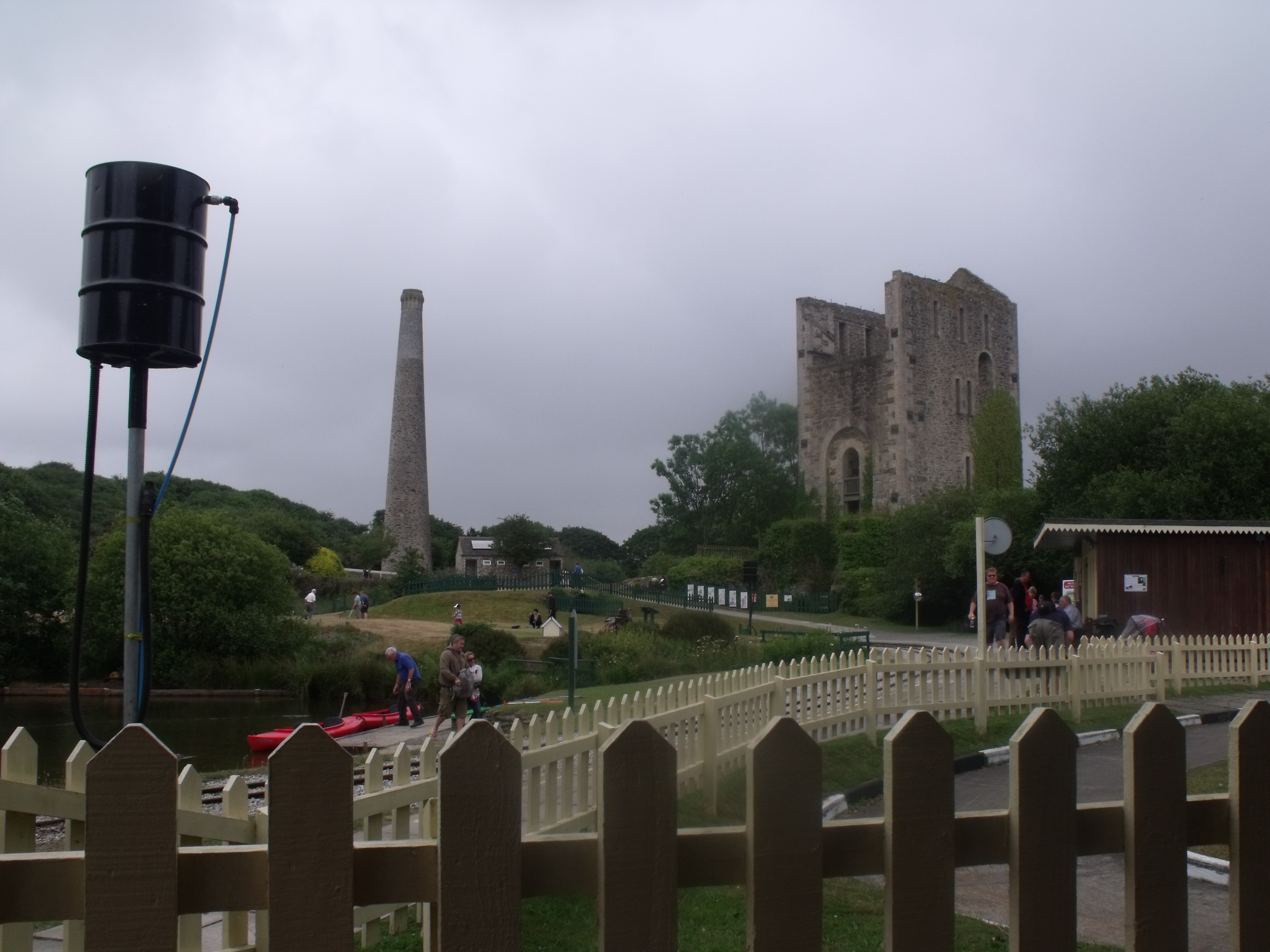
East Wheal Rose station

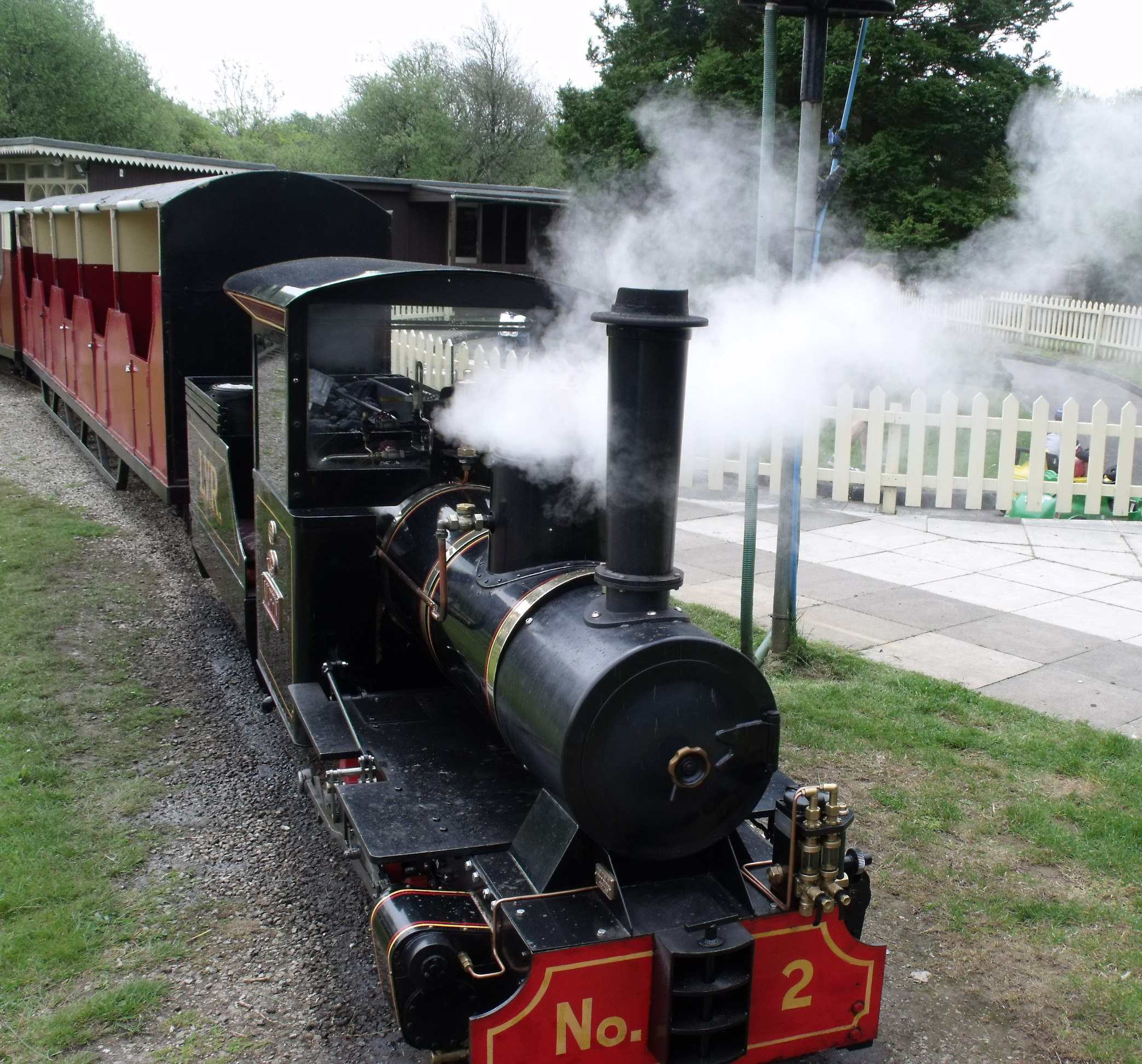
'Muffin' at East Wheal Rose railway station

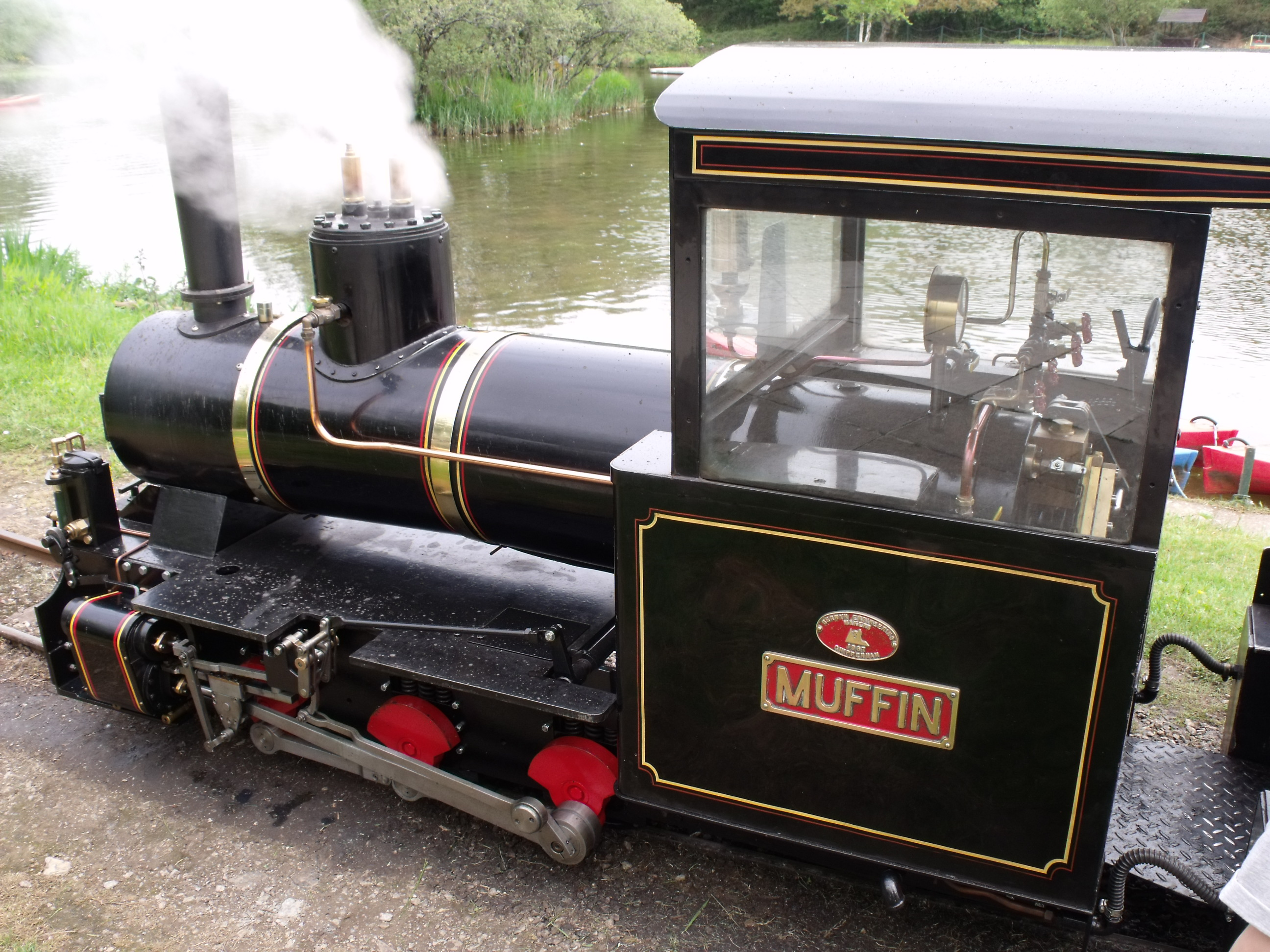
'Muffin' at East Wheal Rose railway station

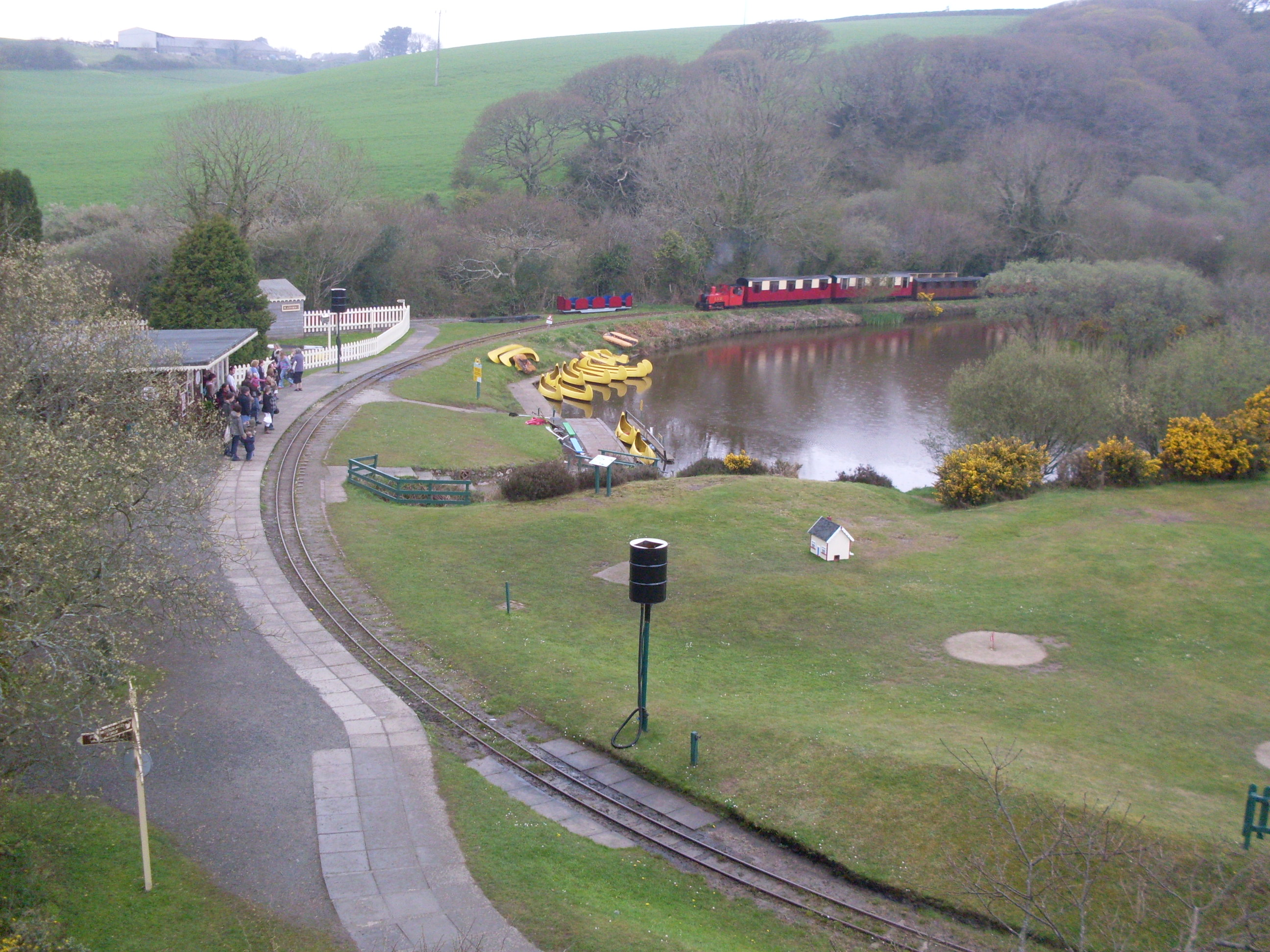
Passengers await an arrival at East Wheal Rose railway station
