= Noyale =

5th-century Welsh saint

Saint Noyale
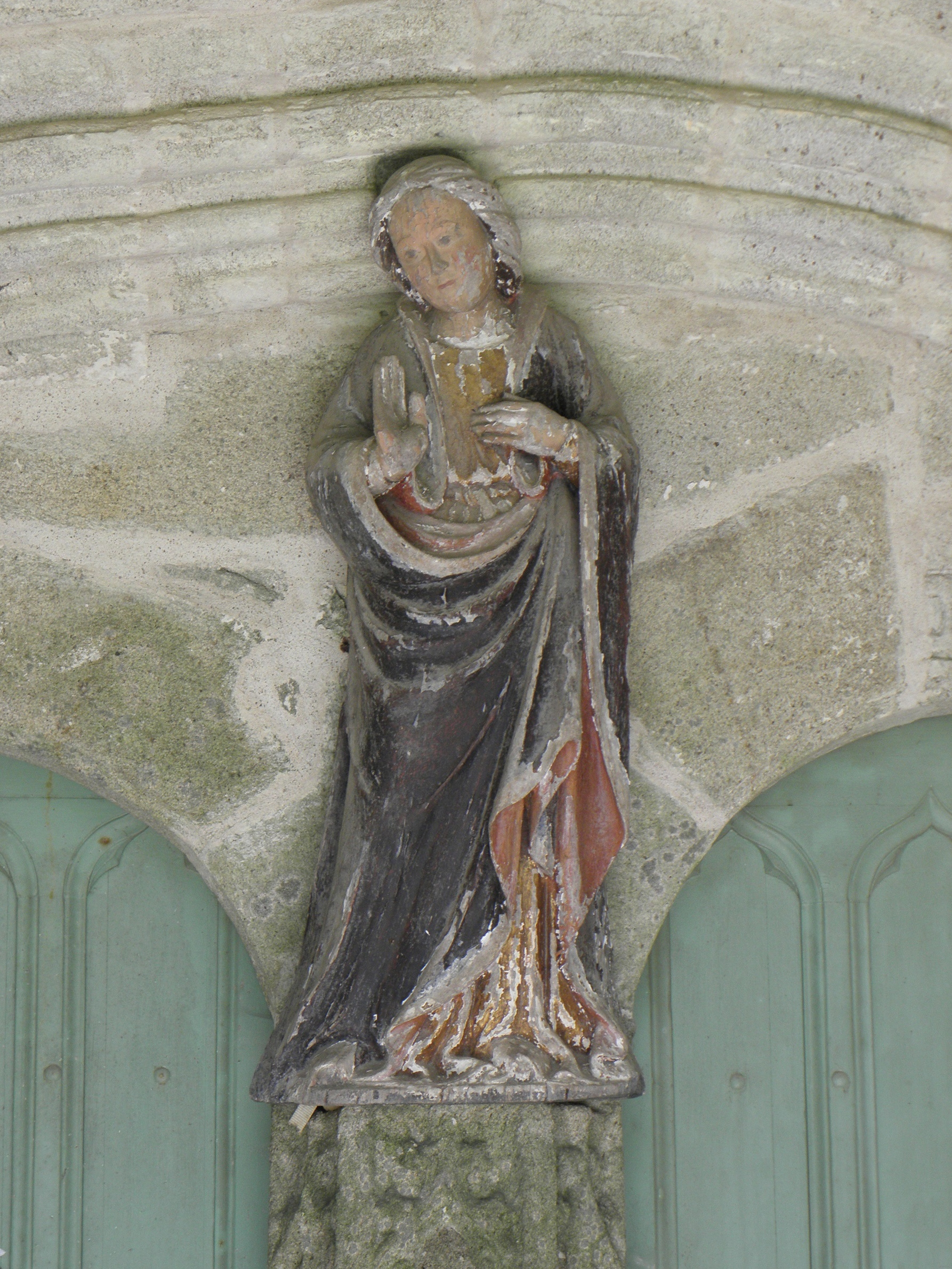
- Statue of Saint Noyale, at Chapelle Sainte-Noyale in Noyal-Pontivy, Brittany

Virgin and martyr
- Born: England
- Died: 5th century
- Venerated in: Roman Catholic Church; Eastern Orthodox Church
- Canonized: Pre-congregation
- Feast: 11 September

Noyale (Latin: Noyala), also known as Noaluen, was a semi-legendary 5th-century Celtic saint and virgin martyr. She is a popular saint in both Brittany and Cornwall, where she is memorialized at Newlyn East. According to legend, it is there that a fig tree growing from the south wall of the church grew from Noyale's staff. A holy well nearby was the site of her martyrdom. She was one of the numerous Celtic settlers who travelled to Brittany during the Anglo-Saxon invasion of England.

== Name ==
Noyale is also known as Noyala of Brittany, Noyala the White, Noaluen, Nolwenn, Newlyn, Neulina, or Newlina.

== Origins ==
According to the earlier hagiographers, Noyale was English and Irish, the daughter of a British king. Modern scholarship now suspects her to have been one of the numerous Welsh settlers who travelled to Brittany.

== Legend ==
Her legend is typical of the 5th-century cephalophore saints. When her father, an English king, wanted to marry her; she fled to Brittany. She and her nurse sailed to the region around Vannes in France, or Beignan where a local lord also wanted to marry her. She refused him and in a rage he beheaded her. The legend then states that the beheaded saint picked up her head, and led by her maid, returned to England.

"According to the popular belief in Brittany, unsupported by any evidence, Noyale or Noaluen was a maiden, who floated over to Brittany with her nurse on the leaf of a tree. She was decapitated in Beignan and walked to Pontivy holding her head in her hands. The chapel dedicated to her at Pontivy was remarkable in the 18th century for several interesting paintings on gold grounds representing this fanciful story."

== Legacy ==
She is the patroness saint of St Newlyn East in Cornwall, and a church building there bears her name. A feast day is celebrated on 27 April. She is also revered as a Pre-Schism Western Saint of the Eastern Orthodox Church. Her feast day is 6 July.

A small stone image of her carrying her head was unearthed in the churchyard at Newlyn East.

Reference to her is made in Ali Smith's novel, Winter.

== See also ==
- Saint Winifred
- Saint Eluned
