= Lappa Valley Steam Railway =

Minimum-gauge railway near Newquay in Cornwall, England

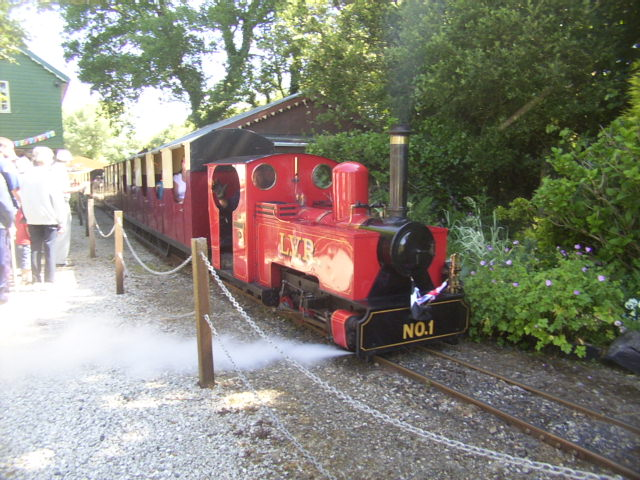
- 15 in (381 mm) gauge steam locomotive Zebedee leaves Benny Halt with a train
- Locale: Newquay, Cornwall, UK
- Terminus: St Newlyn East

Commercial operations
- Built by: Great Western Railway
- Original gauge: 4 ft 8 1/2 in (1,435 mm) standard gauge

Preserved operations
- Owned by: Privately owned
- Operated by: Lappa Valley Railway Co. Ltd
- Stations: 2
- Length: 1 mile (1.6 km)
- Preserved gauge: 15 in (381 mm)

Commercial history
- Opened: 4 February 1905
- Closed: 4 February 1963

Preservation history
- 16 June 1974: Lappa Valley Railway opened

The Lappa Valley Railway is a 15 in (381 mm) minimum-gauge railway located near Newquay in Cornwall. The railway functions as a tourist attraction, running from Benny Halt (50.3756°N 5.0412°W) to East Wheal Rose (50.3623°N 5.0416°W), where there is a leisure area with two miniature railways.

== History ==
=== Treffry's Tramway ===
In 1843, Joseph Treffry suggested building a tramway between Par and Newquay, with a branch line to the East Wheal Rose silver lead mine, which at the time was entering its most prosperous period. Treffry spent six years trying to overcome public opposition to the tramway and was forced to modify his intended route. The Treffry Tramways were eventually built from Newquay to St. Dennis with the branch line to East Wheal Rose, and the first load of ore left East Wheal Rose on 26 February 1849 in horse-drawn tubs. 1874 saw the Treffry's network of tramways taken over by the Cornwall Minerals Railway, who introduced steam locomotives to the line.

=== Great Western Railway ===
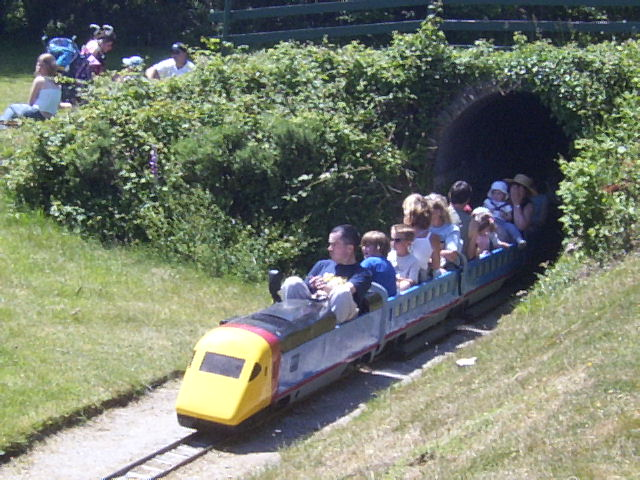
7 1/4 in (184 mm) gauge train at East Wheal Rose

The Great Western Railway took over the Cornish Minerals Railway in 1896, and incorporated the East Wheal Rose branch into a new railway from Newquay to Chacewater via. Perranporth. This new railway was opened in 1905, and enabled passengers to reach the market town of Truro much quicker than they had before. The Newquay to Chacewater branch line also proved popular for holidaymakers. The railway closed on 4 February 1963 under the Beeching cuts.

=== Lappa Valley Steam Railway ===
The Lappa Valley Steam Railway was established by Eric Booth in the 1970s. The trackbed was cleared of the thick undergrowth that had grown since the closure of the railway in 1963, and 15 in (381 mm) gauge track was laid for 1 mile (1.6 km) between Benny Halt and East Wheal Rose. A brand new steam locomotive Zebedee was built for the line by Severn Lamb, arriving in early 1974 with 4 locally-built carriages. The railway opened to the public on 16 June 1974. A large boating lake was dug at East Wheal Rose in 1975 to drain the area, and the whole East Wheal Rose area landscaped. More locomotives arrived from Longleat in 1976, with more carriages also being built at the time. In the 1970s a 7 1/4 in (184 mm) gauge railway was laid around a smaller boating lake, whilst a third railway, of 10 1/4 in (260 mm) gauge, running a further 1/2 mi (805 m) along the old trackbed was opened in May 1995.

In 2014 a new owner acquired the railway and made various improvements. A new visitor attraction called the 'Engine Shed' opened in 2021.

== The route of Lappa Valley ==
- Benny Halt
- East Wheal Rose

== East Wheal Rose ==
At East Wheal Rose, the 10 1/4 in (260 mm) gauge Newlyn Branch Line and 7 1/4 in (184 mm) gauge Woodland Railway depart from the top station on the Newlyn Branch Line, where there is another children's play area.

There are two lakes, the biggest being the boating lake, the second smaller lake being the wildlife lake, a crazy golf course and many children's play areas. Also there are a gift shop and licensed café, and a brick path maze depicting the first steam locomotive built by Richard Trevithick, along with many walks through the valley.

== Stocklist ==
Number	Name	Gauge	Type	Builder	Built	Origin	Picture	Notes
1	Zebedee	15 in (381 mm)	0-6-4T	Severn Lamb	1974	Built for Lappa Valley		Rebuilt from 0-6-2T in 1990.
2	Muffin	15 in (381 mm)	0-6-0TL	Berwyn Engineering	1967	Longleat Railway		Arrived in 1976
4	Ellie	15 in (381 mm)	0-4-2T	Exmoor Steam Railway	2006	Originally built for a private line, was regauged from 12 1/4 inch gauge		Arrived August 2017
50	City of Truro	15 in (381 mm)	B-B DH	Alan Keef Ltd	2023	Built for Lappa Valley		
D5905	City of Derby	15 in (381 mm)	BR Class 23 'Baby Deltic'	Cleethorpes Coast Light Railway	2003	Markeaton Park Light Railway		Arrived September 2016
	Arthur	15 in (381 mm)	0-4-0DM	RA Lister and Company	1952	Worked at Longleat for a number of years		Works Number 20698
	Duke of Cornwall	10 1/4 in (260 mm)	4w-4wPH	Severn Lamb	1981	Carlyon Bay, St Austell		
	Eric	10 1/4 in (260 mm)	0-6-0DH	Alan Keef	2008	Built for Lappa Valley		Named after the founder of Lappa Valley
	The Duke	10 1/4 in (260 mm)	0-6-0DH	Alan Keef	2014	Built for the Wells Harbour Railway		Arrived in 2021
		7 1/4 in (184 mm)	4-4wPH	Mardyke	1980			HST; Now just a static exhibit
		7 1/4 in (184 mm)	4w+4wPH	Mardyke	1982			Model of Advanced Passenger Train
	Victoria	7 1/4 in (184 mm)	0-4-4-0BE	Martyn Redfearn & Brian Biggs	2009			Arrived and entered service in 2020, Rebuilt over the winter of 2023 and converted to Battery Electric power from diesel electric.

== Former stocklist ==
Howard	10 in (254 mm)	Based At Poole Park Railway	Left in 2023
Ruby	15 in (381 mm)	Based At UNKNOWN	Left in 2026
