= Kurt Jackson =

English painter (born 1961)

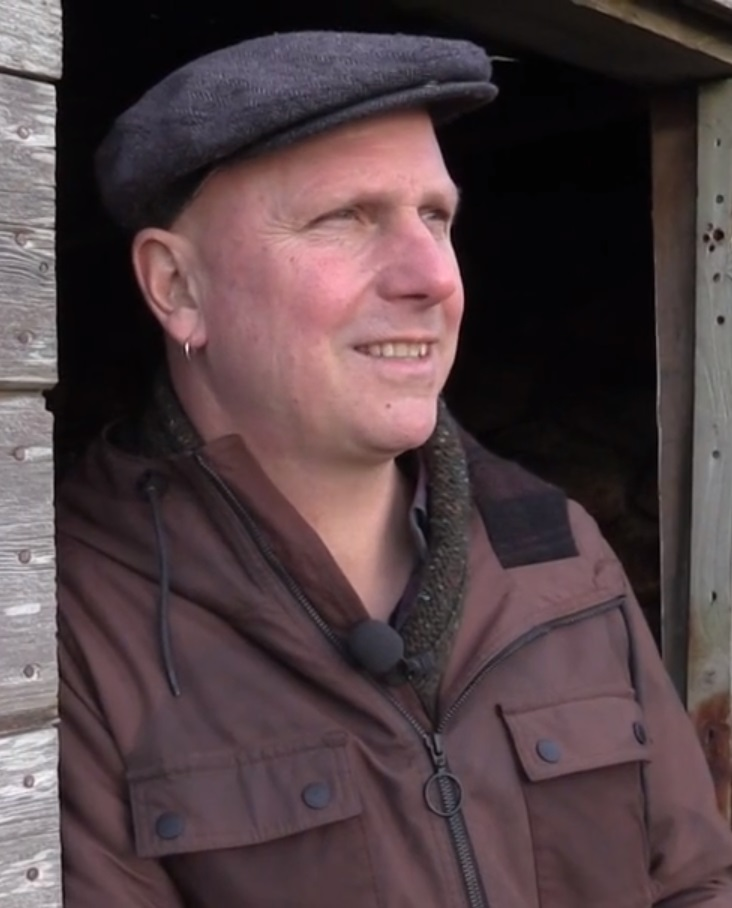
- Jackson in 2014
- Born: 21 September 1961 (age 64); Blandford, Dorset, England
- Education: Ruskin School of Drawing and Fine Art
- Alma mater: St Peter's College, Oxford
- Known for: Painting, drawing
- Spouse: Caroline Jackson
- Elected: Royal West of England Academy
- Website: www.kurtjackson.com

Kurt Jackson (born 21 September 1961) is a British painter whose large canvases reflect a concern with natural history, ecology and environmental issues.

== Biography ==
Born in Blandford, Dorset, the son of two painters, he developed an early interest in natural history and landscape. He studied zoology at St Peter's College, Oxford, but spent most of his time attending classes at The Ruskin School of Drawing and Fine Art or painting in the countryside around Oxford. In 1984 he and his wife Caroline Jackson moved to Cornwall; currently (2014), he lives and works near St Just, Penwith.

He paints in mixed media, drawing inspiration from the Cornish landscape around Penwith and elsewhere in Britain and abroad. Appearances on British television include 'Kurt Jackson, A Picture of Cornwall' BBC1 South West, 2005 and 'Kurt Jackson, A Picture of the South West', BBC3, 2005. In January 2021, he was featured in two television programmes, an episode of Rick Stein's Cornwall on BBC and the opening episode of Cornwall and Devon Walks with Julia Bradbury on ITV.

He has been Artist in Residence on the Greenpeace ship Esperanza, at the Eden Project and at Glastonbury Festival since 1999. He has an Honorary Doctorate (DLitt) from Exeter University and is an Honorary Fellow of St Peter's College, Oxford University. He is an ambassador for Survival International and frequently works with Friends of the Earth, Greenpeace, WaterAid, Oxfam, Surfers Against Sewage and Cornwall Wildlife Trust. He is an academician of the Royal West of England Academy.

In 2024, Jackson was made a bard of Gorsedh Kernow for "promoting Cornish Identity and Culture" through his work.

== Style ==
'An Mor Kernewek' 2003. Mixed media and collage on linen. 200x325cm.

The majority of Jackson's work reflects his commitment to the environment and the natural world within Cornwall, although he also works elsewhere in Britain and mainland Europe; recent projects include bodies of work on the Thames, the Avon, the Forth, Ardnamurchan and the Glastonbury Festival series. His paintings frequently carry small commentaries on the scene depicted and show a fascination particularly with the detail of plants and animals within an overall ecology and evoke a calm, spiritual and warm relationship with the landscape, even of apparently bleak scenes. His work has been described as "uplifting" and "transporting". To quote Robert Macfarlane "the bristling of landscape is Kurt Jackson's subject as an artist, and his brilliance as an artist lies in the success with which he represents his subject."
