= East Wheal Rose =

Former metalliferous mine in Cornwall, England

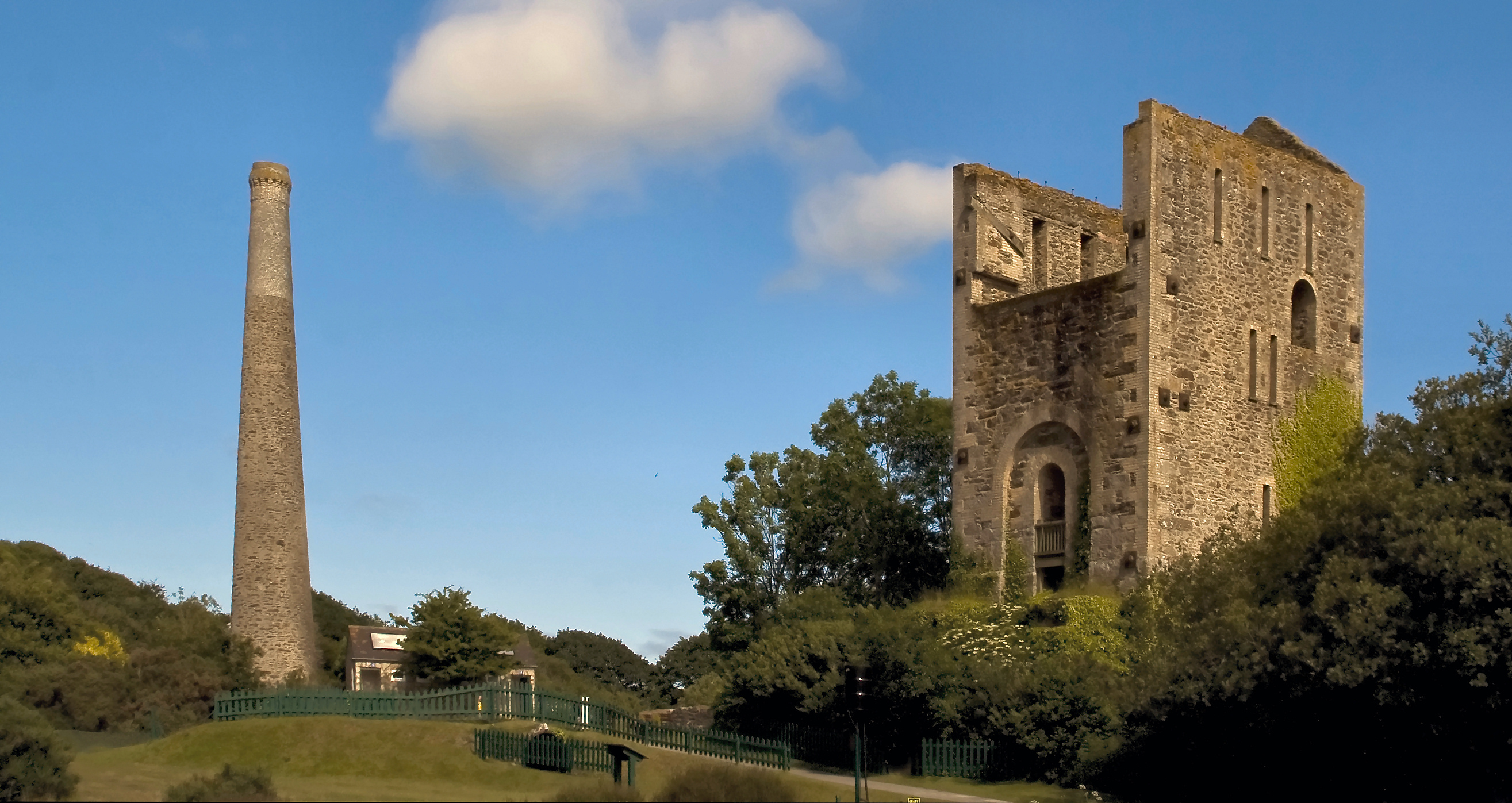
- The preserved engine house and stack

- Location in Cornwall
- Location: Newquay, Cornwall, United Kingdom; 50°21′43″N 5°02′28″W
- Products: Lead, also silver and zinc
- Opened: 1834
- Closed: 1886

East Wheal Rose was a metalliferous mine around three-quarters of a mile (1.2 km) south east of the village of St Newlyn East and is around 4 miles (6.4 km) from Newquay on the north Cornwall coast, United Kingdom. The country rock at the mine was killas and its main produce was lead ore (galena), but as is usual when mining this mineral, commercial quantities of silver and zinc were also found and sold.

Lead was found in the area in 1812 and in 1834 the mine was established, by 1846 the mine employed over 1,200 men, women and children.

The two main lodes, called Middleton's Lode and East Lode, trended north-south. The ore they contained was in places very soft and loose and the killas was also not a particularly strong rock, necessitating extensive underground timbering, particularly in the shafts. Records show that the mine had more than twenty shafts on the two lodes, and the deepest workings were at 150 fathoms (900 ft).

== Disaster in 1846 ==
The mine was sited in the valley of a small stream at the point where it opens out into a natural bowl and is virtually surrounded by hills. The outlet from this bowl is through a narrow ravine through which the stream flows into the River Gannel. Just after noon on 9 July 1846 there was an unusually heavy thunderstorm which lasted an hour and a quarter. Captain Middleton, the mine manager, reported that within five minutes of it starting to rain, water was flowing down the hills in torrents. Despite efforts by the men on the surface to dam or divert the water from the shafts the mine was rapidly flooded up to the 50 fathom (300 ft) level, and of the estimated 200 miners who were underground at the time, 39 were drowned.

== Later history ==
Despite the setback the mine soon reopened and continued producing ore until it closed in 1886. A 90-inch engine, supplied by Messrs Harvey and company of Hayle, came into operation on 3 June 1882 and when the 900 fathoms (5,400 ft) of main adit level was cleared, several lodes were discovered and the Middleton's lode was longer than previously thought. The engine was christened ″Inne's Engine″ by Lady Innes. Between 1845 and 1885 it produced 48,200 tons of 62% lead ore, 212,700 ounces of silver and 280 tons of zinc ore.

Today, apart from the preserved engine house and chimney stack (which stands at 120 ft high), there are few remains of the mine visible. The site is a tourist attraction with a boating lake, crazy golf etc. It is at one end of the Lappa Valley Steam Railway which follows part of the route of one of the Treffry Tramways that was opened in 1849 for hauling ore from the mine to Newquay.

== Mineral Statistics ==
From Robert Hunt's Mineral Statistics of the United Kingdom.

Lead Production (from stannary records; 1836-1861)
Year(s)	Ore (Tons)	Metal (Tons)	........	Value (£)	Comment
1836	69.88	..	..	960.73	Last quarter only
1837	92.35	..	..	827.65	Lead & silver ore
1837	..	..	..	40.70	..
1838	169.64	..	..	1,646.85	..
1838	..	..	..	505.91	..
1839	470.24	..	..	4,972.39	..
1840	1,390.58	..	..	15,087.66	..
1841	2,614.64	..	..	29,388.29	..
1842	3,006.54	..	..	32,857.84	..
1843	4,462.50	..	..	53,385.37	..
1844	6,975.98	..	..	76,558.54	..
1845	7,412.76	..	..	90,360.14	..
1846	5,484.13	..	..	72,875.95	..
1847	6,721.21	..	..	85,163.75	..
1848	5,913.60	..	..	64,017.20	..
1849	5,128.64	..	..	62,178.53	..
1850	4,488.43	..	..	62,203.99	..
1851	2,430.19	..	..	33,029.83	..
1852	2,841.54	..	..	39,198.09	..
1853	1,627.99	..	..	27,769.02	..
1854	1,062.92	..	..	16,781.07	..
1855	2,057.73	..	..	29,592.83	Xmas qr 1854 Incl
1856	3,245.82	..	..	48,832.90	..
1857	1,199.18	..	..	20,497.08	..
1858	723.33	..	..	9,706.53	..
1859	748.36	..	..	9,213.43	..
1860	432.55	..	..	4,774.18	..
1861	204.33	..	..	1,914.21	Xmas qr 1860 incl

Lead & Silver Production (1845-1886)
Year(s)	Ore (Tons)	Lead (Tons)	Silver (ozs)	Value (£)
1845	7,883.00	4,729.00	..	..
1846	5,191.00	3,114.00	..	..
1847	6,424.00	3,854.00	..	..
1848	5,333.00	3,191.00	..	..
1849	4,758.70	2,856.00	..	..
1850	4,206.00	2,524.10	..	..
1851	3,192.90	2,234.00	..	..
1852	2,381.10	1,607.00	48,000.00	..
1853	1,357.10	925.00	27,499.00	..
1854	1,215.00	828.30	24,621.00	..
1855	2,343.10	1,510.30	46,760.00	..
1856	2,691.00	1,776.00	53,280.00	..
1857	1,199.20	791.30	23,739.00	..
1858	726.00	416.50	10,400.00	..
1859	728.00	386.00	13,090.00	..
1860	607.30	322.00	10,948.00	..
1861	147.00	66.00	2,376.00	..
1865	44.00	31.00	1,221.00	..
1866	147.70	102.90	4,015.00	..
1872	6.00	4.50	22.00	..
1882	40.00	30.00	..	..
1883	155.40	114.70	..	1,548.00
1884	85.00	..	..	595.00
1885	50.00	..	..	456.00
1886	58.00	..	..	..

Copper Production (from ticketing records; 1850-7)
Year(s)	Ore (Tons)	Metal (Tons)	........	Value (£)	Comment
1850	50.18	..	..	501.14	..
1851	97.00	..	..	839.49	..
1852	31.62	..	..	138.33	..
1854	26.29	..	..	162.97	..
1856	24.00	..	..	211.20	Xmas qr 1855 incl
1857	16.52	..	..	170.19	

Zinc Production (1855-1883)
Year(s)	Ore (Tons)	Metal (Tons)	..............	Value (£)
1855	no-details	..	..	..
1857	31.00	..	..	4.70
1859	19.00	..	..	8.60
1882	70.00	31.50	..	199.00
1883	161.20	56.30	..	167.00

Employment (1881-6)
Year(s)	Total	Overground	Underground
1881	103	81	22
1882	139	68	71
1883	116	56	60
1884	59	27	32
1885	62	31	31
1886	62	25	37

== See also ==
- Mining in Cornwall and Devon
- Wheal Jane
