= Jill Stein (restaurateur) =

British restaurateur and interior designer

Jill Stein OBE
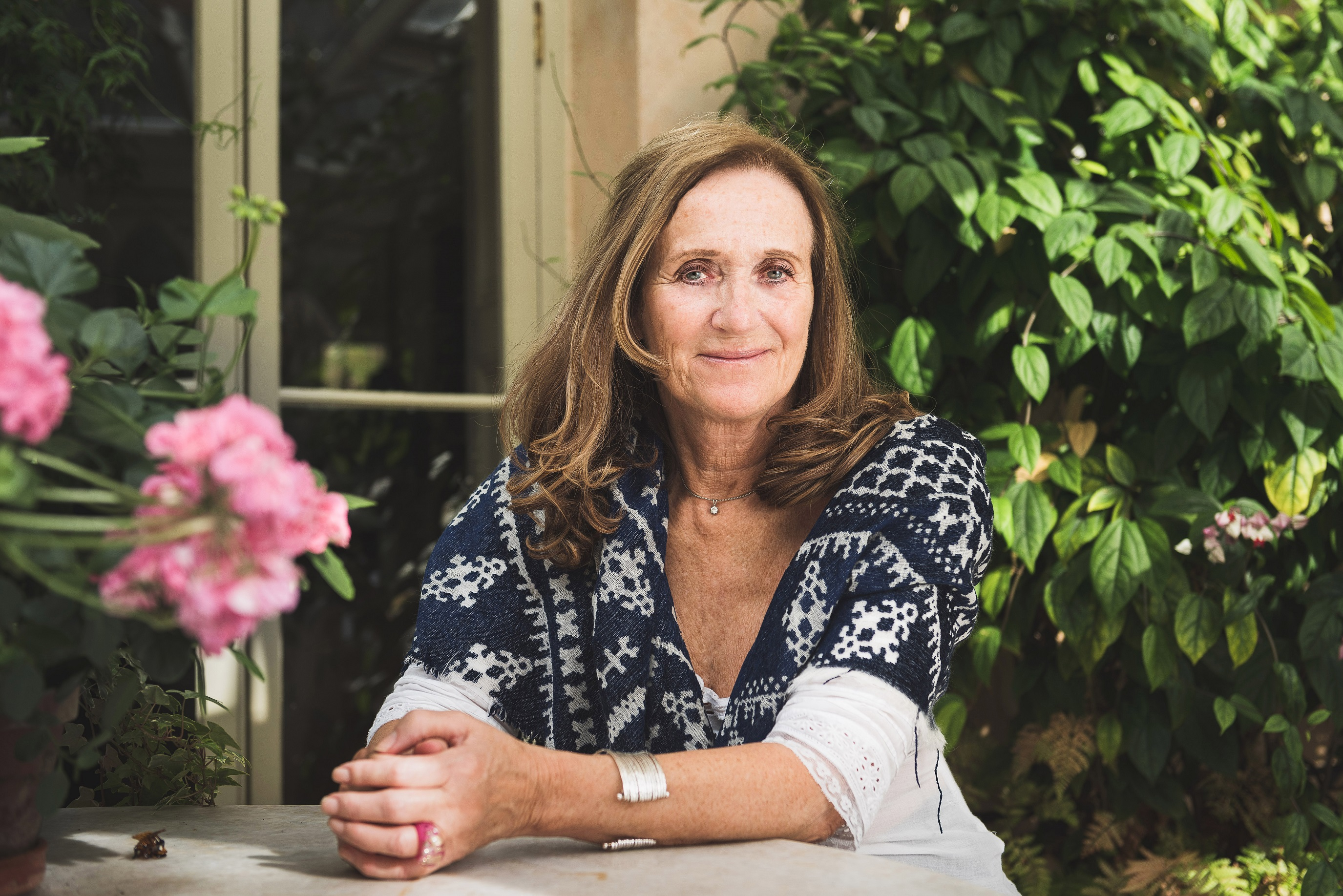
- Born: Jill Newstead; 1947 (age 78–79)
- Occupations: Restaurateur, interior designer
- Years active: 1975–present
- Known for: The Seafood Restaurant
- Spouse: Rick Stein (m. 1975; div. 2007)
- Children: 3
- Awards: OBE (2013)

Jill Stein OBE (née Newstead; born 1947) is a British restaurateur and interior designer, known for co-running The Seafood Restaurant in Padstow, England with former husband Rick Stein. In 2019, she was named the chair of Visit Cornwall.

== Career ==
In 1975, with then husband Rick Stein, Jill started The Seafood Restaurant in Padstow. Jill ran front of house and business side of the restaurant whilst Rick was in the kitchen. The business now includes twelve restaurants, a pub, 40 guest bedrooms, a cookery school and four shops. She has also worked as an interior designer on their businesses. Jill has been the driving force behind the scenes, designing restaurant interiors for Rick Stein's Café (1982), St Petroc's Bistro (1988), Stein's Fish & Chips (2004), The Cornish Arms (2009), Falmouth (2010), Porthleven and Winchester (2014), Fistral and Sandbanks (2015), Seafood Bar and Marlborough (2016) and Barnes (2017)

== Recognition ==
Stein was appointed Officer of the Order of the British Empire (OBE) in the 2013 Birthday Honours for services to the restaurant industry.

She received a Lifetime Achievement Award at the Women 1st Shine Awards, which recognises women in the hospitality and service industry She also appeared in Women 1st's Top 100 women in hospitality in 2011 and CODE Hospitality's Top 100 list in 2019.

In 2011, she received an honorary doctorate of business from Plymouth University.

== Personal life ==
Jill married Rick Stein in 1975. They have three sons, who are all involved in the business. They divorced in 2007, but agreed to continue running the business together.
