= Tresillian House, St Newlyn East =

Country house in Cornwall, England

Tresillian House
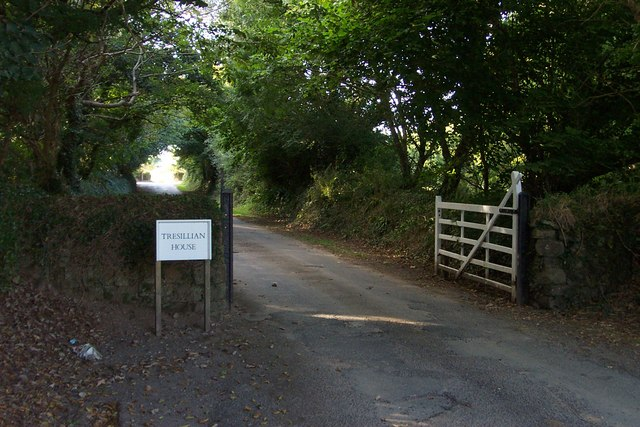
- Entrance drive to Tresillian House

- Location within Cornwall
- 50.385833°N 5.017778°W
- Location: St Newlyn East, Cornwall, England

Listed Building – Grade II
- Official name: Tresillian House
- Designated: 30 May 1967
- Reference no.: 1141420

Tresillian House is a country house near St Newlyn East, off the A3058 road, Cornwall, England. It was registered as a Grade II listed building on 30 May 1967. It is most associated with the Bennet family historically; John Bennet, Curate of Antony was once owner of the house and in 1837 it was occupied by Richard Gully Bennet, who was a Magistrate of Cumberland. Tresillian means "a place of eels" in Cornish.

== Architecture ==
The house is dated to the late 18th century but was extended in the mid-19th century for the Gully-Bennett family. It is a two-storey house, made of gritstone and granite flush quoins, with a dalabole slate roof and twelve paned windows with Georgian glazed panels, five of them at the front. The central entrance hall on the north-east front leads to a large oak staircase, and the library (refurbished in late 19th -early 20th century) and main drawing room are located on the south-east side. The drawing room has a central floral rose and a Carrara marble chimneypiece. It was recently restored by Robert Rowett Architectural Services.

== Descent ==
=== Gully ===
- Samuel I Gully of Leigh, Devon, purchased Tresillian in 1699.
- Enodor Gully (d. 1748), whose will dated 1708 named his nephew Samuel Gully (d.pre–1748) (son of his late brother Ezekiel Gully) as his sole executor and residuary legatee.
- Samuel II Gully (heir), who left progeny one son Richard Gully (d. 1791) and one daughter Phillippa Gully, wife of Reverend John Bennet (d. 1785).
- Richard Gully (d. 1791), son, who died without progeny.

=== Bennet ===
- Rev. John Bennet (d. January 1805), nephew, Curate of Antony, Cornwall. He was the son of Reverend John Bennet (d. 1785), Vicar of Gwinear, Cornwall (son of Reverend Thomas Bennet (d. 1767), Vicar of St Enoder, Cornwall), by his wife Phillippa Gully, daughter of Samuel II Gully of Tresillian and sister of Richard Gully (d. 1791) of Tresillian. In about 1792 he married Elizabeth Wallis (d. August 1805), a daughter and co-heiress of Reverend Mydhope Wallis of Trethill.
- Richard I Gully Bennet (1793 – 1836), son, who in 1820 married Loveday Basset (1798 – 1821), daughter of William Basset of Pencorse, Cornwall.
- Richard II Gully Bennet (1820 – 1910), son, JP, DL, who in 1846 married Mary Jean Hosken, daughter of Richard Hosken of Carines House, Cubert.
- Lt Col Edward Gully Bennet (1849 – 1927), eldest son and heir, JP, Lt.Col. Northamptonshire Regiment, who died unmarried without progeny.
- Lt Col Ferdinando Wallis Bennet (1850 – 1929), younger brother, a JP for Devon and Lt.Col. and Brevet Col. of the Royal Engineers. He was Vice-Consul of Anatolia 1880–82. He married Evelyn Mary Palmer, daughter of Major-General Palmer, Royal Engineers.
- Capt. Leonard Wallis Bennet (1897 – post 1937), son, a captain in the Royal Artillery who served in World War I and was twice mentioned in despatches. In 1928 he married Armenell Betty Wynter, only daughter of Gerald Merritt Wynter, by whom he had four daughters, living in 1937.

=== Robinson ===
In 2000 Tresillian was purchased by George Edward Silvanus Robinson (born 1956), who was a founding partner of the City of London hedge fund Sloane Robinson, founded in 1993, which in 2008 was the sixth biggest European hedge fund with assets under management of $15.1 billion, but in 2012 ranked 32nd with $3 billion in assets. His wealth was estimated in 2009 by The Sunday Times Rich List at £100 million. He is a prominent donor to the Conservative Party and in 2004 was appointed a trustee of the right-wing think-tank Policy Exchange. Tresillian had been purchased from the Bennet family after World War II by his maternal grandfather, a noted gardener and specialist breeder of daffodils, who created the Summercourt daffodil, a variety of narcissus. George's mother spent her childhood at Tresillian. He kept on the head gardener since 1985, John Harris, now a well-known gardening expert and broadcaster who follows the principles of Moon gardening, plant management in accord with the phases of the moon.

== Sources ==
- Burke's Genealogical and Heraldic History of the Landed Gentry, 15th edition, ed. by H. Pirie-Gordon. London, 1937, p. 136, Bennet of Tresillian
