= Rick Stein =

English chef (born 1947)

Rick Stein CBE
- Stein in 2015
- Born: Christopher Richard Stein; 4 January 1947 (age 79); Churchill, Oxfordshire, England
- Education: Uppingham School; New College, Oxford
- Years active: 1975–present
- Spouses: Jill Stein (m. 1975; div. 2007) Sarah Burns (m. 2011)
- Children: 3
- Culinary career
- Cooking style: Asian, Australian, European
- Website: rickstein.com

Christopher Richard Stein (born 4 January 1947) is an English celebrity chef, restaurateur, writer and television presenter. Along with business partner and first wife Jill Stein, he runs the Stein hotel and restaurant business in the UK. The business has a number of renowned restaurants, shops and hotels in Padstow along with other restaurants in Winchester and Barnes. He is the head chef and a co-owner of the Rick Stein at Bannisters restaurants in Mollymook and Port Stephens in Australia, with his second wife, Sarah. He writes cookery books and has presented numerous cookery series for the BBC.

== Early years ==
Of German descent, Christopher Richard Stein was born on 4 January 1947 in Churchill, Oxfordshire, to Eric Stein (1908–1965) and Dorothy Gertrude née Jackson (1909–1999). He was born and brought up on a farm.

Stein was educated at Wells Court, a preparatory school just outside Tewkesbury, then Wells House, the Court's bigger sister-school at Malvern Wells, and then Uppingham School. He took A-levels in English, history and geography, but failed all of them. He moved to a cram school in Brighton, gaining E grades in English and history.

Stein partially completed a hotel management traineeship with British Transport Hotels at its Great Western Royal Hotel in Paddington. He worked there as a chef for six months. Distraught by his father's suicide, at age 19 he went to Australia, where he worked as a labourer in an abattoir and as a clerk in a naval dockyard. To "take some time out" he travelled to New Zealand, where he picked asparagus, and Mexico. His 21st birthday was spent in Kaikōura, New Zealand, where he ate a rock lobster and slept under a bridge.

Being on his own, he read widely, reflected on his attitude to education, and applied successfully to New College, Oxford, where he earned an English degree in 1971. Shortly after that, he moved to Padstow.

== Career ==
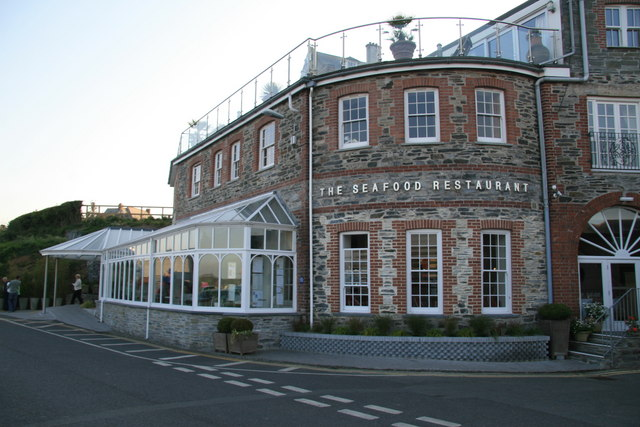
Rick Stein's Seafood Restaurant, Padstow

After graduating, Stein converted a mobile disco in Padstow, which he had run as a student, into a quayside nightclub with his friend, Johnny. It became known for its freeze-dried curries. However, the nightclub lost its licence and was closed down by the police, mainly due to frequent brawls with local fishermen. The pair still had a licence for a restaurant in another part of the building, so they continued with that to avoid bankruptcy.

Stein ran the kitchen using the experience he had gained as a commis chef. Eventually he converted it into a small harbour-side bistro, The Seafood Restaurant, with his first wife Jill in 1975. As of 2015, his business operates four restaurants, a bistro, a café, a seafood delicatessen, a pâtisserie shop, a gift shop and a cookery school.

In 2007, threats against Stein's businesses were made by Cornish nationalists. His impact on the economy of Padstow is such that it has been nicknamed "Padstein". In 2009, Stein made his first acquisition in the nearby village of St Merryn, 3 1/2 miles (6 km) from Padstow, taking over the Cornish Arms public house on the village's outskirts, intending to keep it as a traditional Cornish pub.

In October 2009, Stein and his future second wife (fiancée at the time), the publicist Sarah Burns, opened Rick Stein at Bannisters in Mollymook, Australia. Stein said at the time of opening, "Ever since a memorable weekend eating Pambula oysters and flathead in Merimbula in the sixties, I've had the image of the clean blue sea and sweet seafood of the South Coast fixed in my head so when I was introduced to Mollymook about six years ago I knew that one day I would open up a restaurant celebrating local fish and shellfish but keeping it really simple."

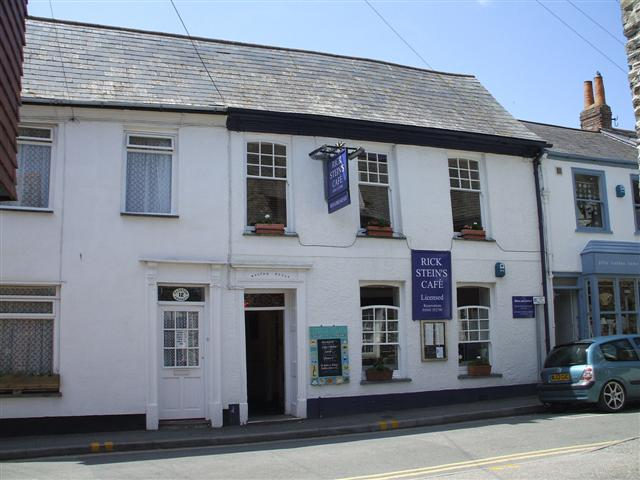
Rick Stein's Café in Padstow

In 2018, Stein opened a second Rick Stein at Bannisters in Salamander Bay in Port Stephens, with his second wife, Sarah. Stein has become a popular television presenter on food programmes. After appearing once as a guest chef in Keith Floyd's 1985 series Floyd on Fish and in his 1986 series Floyd on Food, he was offered the chance to present his own series – like the "travelogue" style of cookery show pioneered by Floyd – on BBC television, using Floyd's producer and director David Pritchard.

His shows have included Rick Stein's Taste of the Sea, Fruits of the Sea, Seafood Odyssey, Fresh Food, Seafood Lovers' Guide, Food Heroes, French Odyssey, Mediterranean Escapes, Far Eastern Odyssey, Rick Stein's Spain and Rick Stein's India. In the last five series, he set out in search of the best in the region's foods.

Stein was often accompanied by his Jack Russell Terrier, Chalky, until his death in 2007. So popular was Chalky that Sharp's Brewery named two speciality beers after him.

A book has accompanied each series, and Stein's book English Seafood Cookery won the Glenfiddich Award for Food Book of the Year in 1989. Stein was awarded the OBE in the 2003 New Year Honours for services to tourism in Cornwall and the CBE in the 2018 New Year Honours for services to the economy.

On 22 June 2020, it was confirmed that Stein's restaurant in Porthleven, Cornwall, would close permanently due to the COVID-19 pandemic. The restaurant had been closed since March 2020. In July 2020, it was announced that chef Michael Caines would take over the restaurant.

== Personal life ==
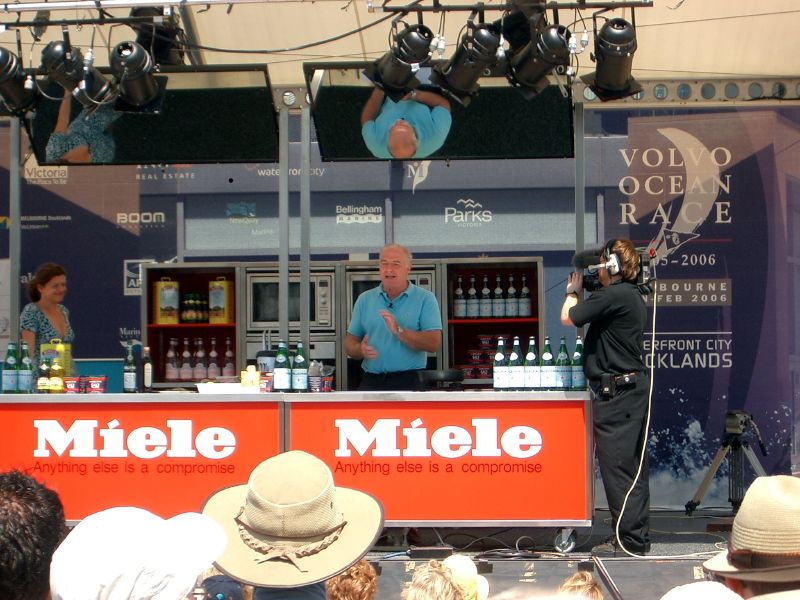
Stein at a 2006 cookery demonstration in Melbourne, Australia

In 1965, when Stein was 18, his father, a retired managing director of The Distillers Company, who suffered from bipolar disorder, killed himself by jumping from a cliff near the family's holiday home at Trevose Head.

Stein met his first wife Jill Newstead in Padstow. They married in 1975, both aged 28, and set up their restaurant and hotel business. Stein has three sons with Jill: Edward, Jack, and Charles, who are involved in the family business.

Stein met Sarah Burns, 20 years his junior, in Australia in 1997, when he was 50. She was also married, and working as a publicity manager for Australia Gourmet Traveller magazine. Stein and Burns had a secret five-year affair before Jill found out in 2002. She and Stein separated in 2002 and divorced in 2007, but agreed to continue to run the business together. Burns divorced in 2003, and she and Stein married on 7 October 2011.

Stein has a brother, John, and a sister, Henrietta. He also has a half-brother, Jeremy, his mother's son from her first marriage. He is the uncle of DJ and music producer Judge Jules, and the artist Lucy Stein.

In 2022, Stein underwent open heart surgery at the Royal Brompton Hospital to repair a defective heart valve. Appearing live on BBC's The One Show in October 2023, promoting his book, Simple Suppers, he shared that his heart surgery experience had inspired his back to basics recipes but he inadvertently used a swear word and the show's host and Stein had to apologise for the error.

== Restaurants owned or operated by Rick Stein ==
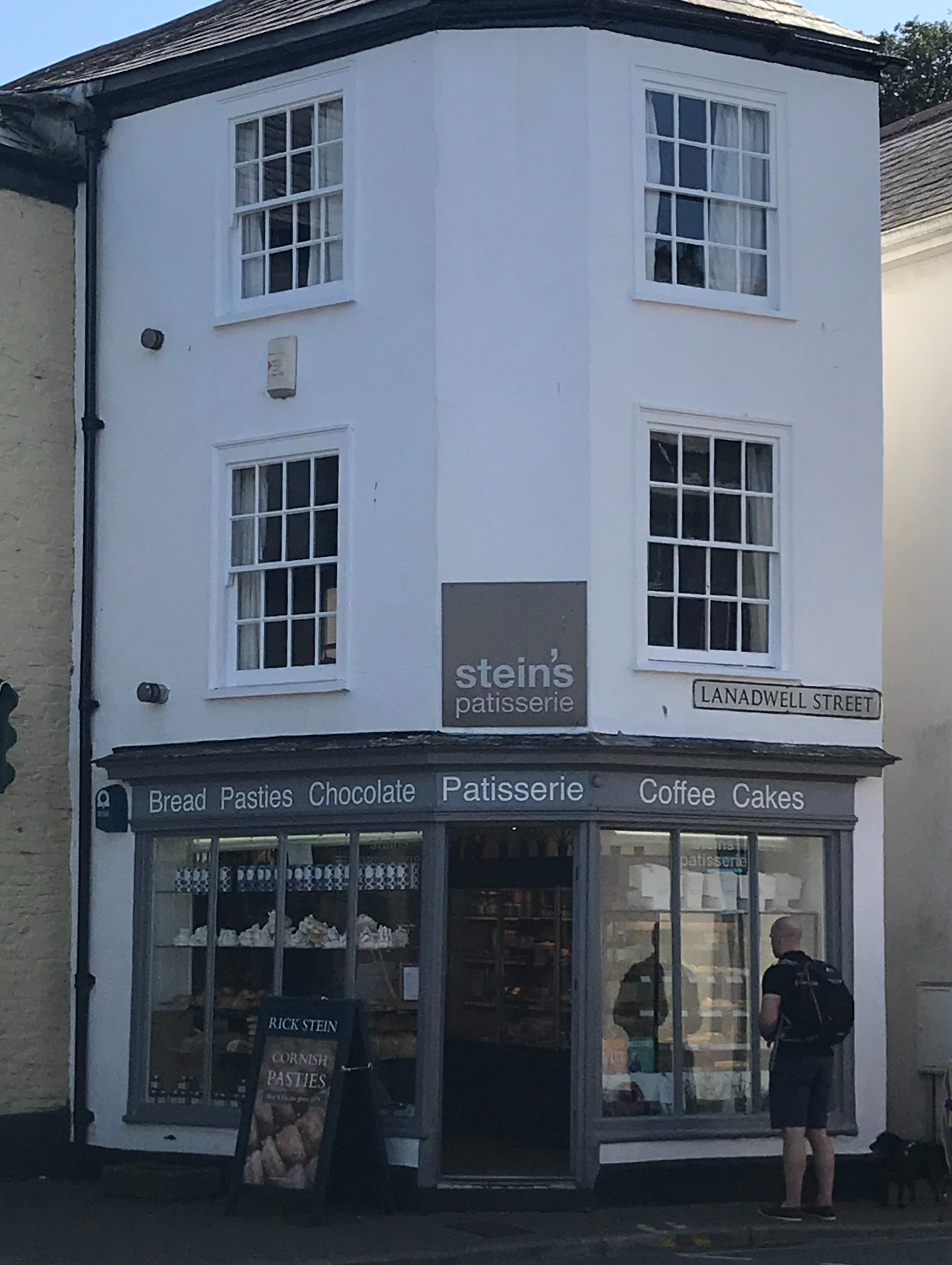
Stein's Patisserie in Padstow

=== England ===
Restaurant	Location	Date opened	Date closed	Ref
The Seafood Restaurant	Padstow, Cornwall	1975	-	
St. Petroc's Bistro	Padstow, Cornwall	1997	-	
Stein's Fish & Chips	Padstow, Cornwall	2004	-	
The Cornish Arms	St Merryn, Cornwall	16 February 2009	-	
Rick Stein, Falmouth	Falmouth, Cornwall	19 March 2010	October 2020	
Rick Stein, Winchester	Winchester, Hampshire	4 November 2014	-	
Rick Stein, Porthleven	Porthleven, Cornwall	8 November 2014	March 2020	
Rick Stein, Fistral	Newquay, Cornwall	3 April 2015	-	
Rick Stein, Sandbanks	Sandbanks, Dorset	November 2015	-	
Rick Stein, Marlborough	Marlborough, Wiltshire	8 October 2016	5 October 2025	
Rick Stein, Barnes	Barnes, London	23 March 2017	-	
Stein’s on the Quay	Padstow, Cornwall	Early Summer 2020	Late Summer 2020	

=== Australia ===
Restaurant	Location	Date opened	Date closed	Ref
Rick Stein at Bannisters Mollymook	Mollymook, New South Wales	October 2009	-	
Rick Stein at Bannisters Port Stephens	Port Stephens, New South Wales	September 2018	-	
Rick Stein at Coogee Beach	Coogee Beach, New South Wales	December 2025	-	

== Publications ==
- English Seafood Cookery, 1988 – Glenfiddich Cook Book of the Year 1989
- A Beginner's Guide to Seafood, 1992 (Chapter 4 Marine Cuisine Guides)
- Beach to Belly, 1994 (foreword)
- Taste of the Sea, 1995 – André Simon Cook Book of the Year 1996
- Good Food Award Best Cookery Book, 1995/1996
- Rick Stein Fish, 10 Recipes, 1996
- Fruits of the Sea (ISBN 0-563-38457-3), 1997
- Rick Stein's Seafood Odyssey (ISBN 978-0-563-38440-3), 1999
- Rick Stein's Seafood Lovers' Guide (ISBN 0-563-48871-9), 2000
- Rick Stein's Seafood, 2001 - Gourmand World Cookbook Awards, 2001 – winner of category: Best Seafood and Fish in English; Best in the World Fish and Seafood (German translation – Gold medal – Gastronomische Akademie Deutschland 2003)
- My Favourite Seafood Recipes, 2002 (Marks and Spencer cookery book)
- Rick Stein's Food Heroes, 2002 – Gourmand World Cookbook Awards 2002 – winner of category: Best Local Cookery Book; Best Cookery Book of the Year in Great Britain / Jacob's Creek World Food Media Awards 2003: Silver for best hardcover recipe book
- Rick Stein's Guide to the Food Heroes of Britain (ISBN 0-563-52175-9), 2003 – Gourmand World Cookbook Awards 2003 – winner of category: Best Guide
- Rick Stein's Food Heroes, Another Helping (ISBN 0-56348-752-6), 2004
- Rick Stein's Complete Seafood (ISBN 1-58008-568-7) – winner of the James Beard Foundation Award 2005 for Cook Book of the Year
- Rick Stein's French Odyssey (ISBN 0-56352-213-5), 2005
- Rick Stein's Mediterranean Escapes (ISBN 0-563-49366-6), 2007
- Rick Stein Coast to Coast (ISBN 9781846076145), 2008
- Rick Stein's Far Eastern Odyssey (ISBN 1-84607-716-8), 2009
- My Kitchen Table: Rick Stein's 100 Fish and Seafood Recipes (ISBN 9781849901581), 2011
- Rick Stein's Spain (ISBN 9781849901352), 2011
- Rick Stein's India (ISBN 978-1849905787), 2013
- Under a Mackerel Sky: A Memoir (ISBN 0-09194-991-2), 2013
- Rick Stein's Long Weekends (ISBN 978-1785940927), 2016
- Rick Stein: The Road to Mexico (ISBN 978-1785942006), 2017
- Rick Stein's Secret France (ISBN 978-1785943881), 2019
- Rick Stein at Home (ISBN 978-1785947087), 2021
- Rick Stein's Simple Suppers (ISBN 978-1785948145), 2023
- Rick Stein’s Food Stories (ISBN 978-1785948602), 2024
- Rick Stein’s Christmas Book (ISBN 978-1785949401), 2025
- Rick Stein's Cookery Course (ISBN 978-1785949913), 2026

== TV ==
- Floyd on Fish, BBC TV, 1985
- Floyd on Food, BBC TV, 1986
- Farmhouse Kitchen, Yorkshire Television, two episodes, 1989 and 1990
- Taste of the Sea, BBC TV, 1995. 6 episodes – Glenfiddich TV Programme of the Year Award, Good Food Award Television Cookery Programme of the Year
- Fruits of the Sea, BBC TV, 1997. 8 episodes – Silver Medal World Food Media Awards Adelaide 1997
- Great Railway Journeys, BBC TV, 1999 (Los Mochis to Veracruz)
- Rick Stein's Seafood Odyssey, BBC TV, 1999. 8 episodes – Bronze Medal World Food Media Awards Adelaide 1999
- Fresh Food, BBC TV, 1999. 6 episodes
- Personal Passions, BBC TV, 1999
- Food and Drink, BBC TV, 1999 – Gold Award for Best Television Food Segment Within a Show: World Food Media Awards Adelaide 1999
- Rick Stein's Seafood Lovers' Guide, BBC TV, 2000. 8 episodes – Glenfiddich TV Programme of the Year Award 2001
- Jacob's Creek World Food Media Awards: Silver for best Television Food Show
- Friends for Dinner, BBC TV, 2000
- Rick Stein on Fishing, ITV, 2001
- Rick Stein's Food Heroes, BBC TV, 2002. 10 episodes – Jacob's Creek World Food Media Awards 2003: Gold for Best Television Food Show
- Rick Stein's Food Heroes, Another Helping, Series 1, BBC TV, October 2003. 6 episodes
- Rick Stein's Food Heroes, Another Helping, Series 2, BBC TV, February 2004. 8 episodes
- Rick Stein's Fish Love, UKTV Fish, August 2004
- Rick Stein's French Odyssey, BBC TV, May 2005. 10 episodes
- Cabin Fever (Behind the scenes and the making of Rick Stein's French Odyssey), BBC TV, Autumn 2005. single 1-hour programme.
- Rick Stein's Food Heroes Christmas Special, BBC TV, December 2005. 2 half-hour episodes, also aired as a 1-hour programme.
- Betjeman and Me: Rick Stein's Story, August 2006
- Rick Stein and the Japanese Ambassador, BBC Two, 2006
- Rick Stein in Du Maurier Country, BBC Two, May 2007
- Fishy Treats and Simple Eats, Japanese Food Network, Autumn 2007
- Rick Stein's Mediterranean Escape, BBC Two, 8 August 2007. 6 episodes
- Rick Stein's Memoirs of a Seafood Chef, BBC Two, 7 January 2009
- Who Do You Think You Are?, BBC TV, 16 February 2009
- Rick Stein's Far Eastern Odyssey, BBC Two, July 2009. 6 episodes
- Rick Stein's Christmas Odyssey, BBC Two, December 2009
- Rick Stein's Food of the Italian Opera, BBC HD, June 2010
- Rick Stein's Cornish Christmas, BBC Two, December 2010
- Rick Stein's Spain, BBC Two, July 2011. 4 episodes
- Rick Stein Tastes The Blues, BBC Four, November 2011
- Rick Stein's Spanish Christmas, BBC Two, December 2011
- Rick Stein's India, BBC Two, June 2013. 6 episodes
- Rick Stein's German Bite, BBC Two, August 2013 (Also referred to as The German Odyssey)
- Rick Stein: From Venice to Istanbul, BBC Two, August 2015. 7 episodes
- A Cook Abroad, BBC Two, 2 March 2015 (episode 5: Rick Stein's Australia)
- Rick Stein's Taste of Shanghai, BBC Two, February 2016
- Rick Stein's Long Weekends, BBC Two, May 2016. 10 episodes
- Rick Stein's Road to Mexico, BBC Two, November 2017. 7 episodes
- Talking Books, BBC 2018
- Rick Stein's Secret France, BBC Two, Autumn 2019. 6 episodes
- Pointless Celebrities, BBC One, 28 November 2020
- Rick Stein's Cornwall, BBC Two, January 2021. 15 episodes
- Rick Stein's Cornwall, Series 2, BBC Two, 2022. 15 episodes
- Rick Stein's Cornwall, Series 3, BBC Two, 2023. 10 episodes
- Rick Stein’s Food Stories, BBC Two, February 2024. 15 episodes
- Rick Stein’s Australia, BBC Two, January 2026. 6 episodes

== DVD / VHS ==
- Rick Stein Cooks Fish (1997 VHS, re-issued as a bonus on Seafood Odyssey DVD)
- Rick Stein's Taste of the Sea (1999 VHS release of 1995 broadcast)
- Rick Stein's Seafood Odyssey (1999 VHS and 2005 DVD)
- Rick Stein's Seafood Lovers Guide (2001 VHS)
- Rick Stein's Food Heroes (2003 VHS and 2005 DVD. DVD release also includes the six episodes of Rick Stein's Food Heroes, Another Helping, Series 1.)
- Rick Stein's French Odyssey (2007 DVD)
- Rick Stein's Mediterranean Escapes (2009 DVD)
- Rick Stein's Far Eastern Odyssey (2010 DVD)
- Rick Stein's Spain (2011 DVD)
- Rick Stein's India (2013 DVD)
- Rick Stein's Venice To Istanbul (2015 DVD)
- Rick Stein's Tastes of the World: From Cornwall to Shanghai (2016 DVD - a compilation of six individual broadcasts: Rick Stein's Taste of Shanghai, Rick Stein's German Odyssey, Rick Stein & The Japanese Ambassador Rick Stein Tastes the Blues, Rick Stein's Taste of the Italian Opera, Rick Stein's Cornish Christmas)
- Rick Stein's Long Weekends (2017 DVD)
- Rick Stein's Road to Mexico (2018 DVD)
- Rick Stein's Secret France (2019 DVD)

== Other awards ==
For the restaurant:

- RAC/The Sunday Times Taste of Britain Best Restaurant Award 1984
- Decanter Magazine Restaurant of the Year 1989
- The Good Hotel Guide Cesar Award 1995
- Egon Ronay's Guide Restaurant of the Year 1996
- Hotel & Restaurant Magazine Seafood Restaurant of the Year 1998, 1999, 2000, 2001 and 2003
- The AA Award – English Seafood Restaurant of the Year Award 2002

For the man:

- The Good Food Award Television and Radio Personality – 1995/1996
- The England for Excellence Awards – Outstanding Contribution to Tourism Award – 1988–1998
- Caterer and Hotelkeeper 1999 Chef Award – Chef of the Year The Catey Awards
- AA Guide Chefs' Chef of the Year 1999–2000
- Waterford Wedgwood Hospitality Award – 1999
- The Glenfiddich Trophy – 2001
- The Cornwall Tourist Award – A special award for outstanding services to Cornwall 2002
- OBE – 2003 New Year Honours: For services to tourism in Cornwall
- CatererSearch 100 – 14th most influential chef in UK in 2005
- In 2012, Stein was among the British cultural icons selected by pop artist Sir Peter Blake to appear in a new version of his most famous artwork – the Beatles' Sgt. Pepper's Lonely Hearts Club Band album cover – to celebrate the British cultural figures of the last six decades.
- 5 July 2016, Rick and Jill Stein received the Special Award at the prestigious Catey Awards, for their more than 41 years of outstanding contribution to the hospitality industry.
- CBE – 2018 New Year Honours: For services to the economy
