= St Newlyn East =

Coordinates: 50.367°N 5.055°W

St Newlyn East: Cornish: Eglosnywlin
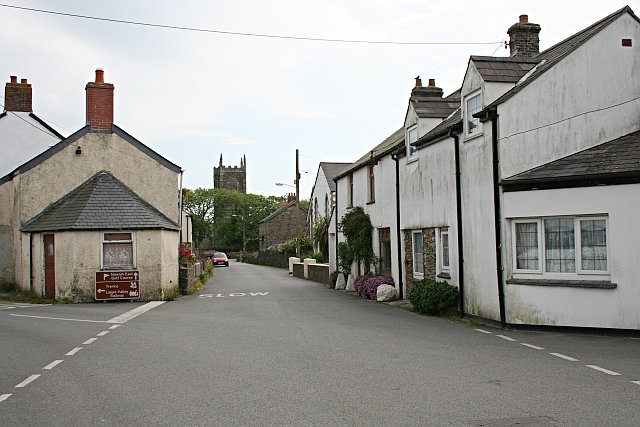
- Shire county: Cornwall
- Region: South West
- Country: England
- Sovereign state: United Kingdom
- Post town: Newquay
- Postcode district: TR8
- Dialling code: 01872
- Police: Devon and Cornwall
- Fire: Cornwall
- Ambulance: South Western

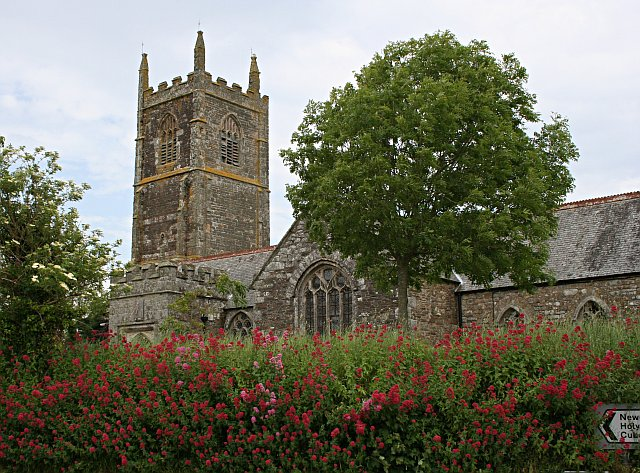
St Newlyn East church

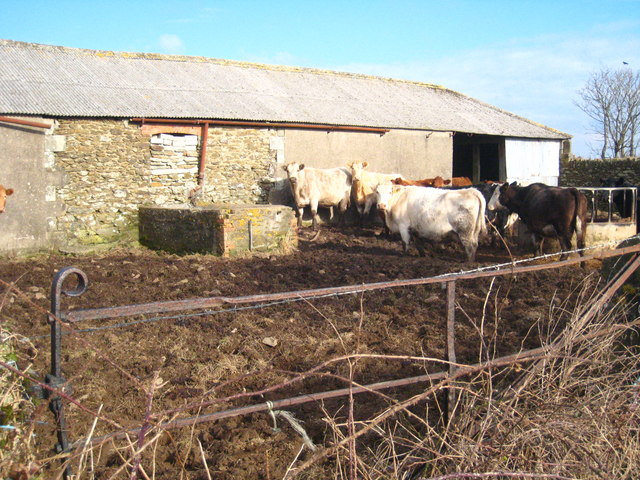
Cargoll Farm

St Newlyn East (Cornish: Eglosnywlin) is a civil parish and village in Cornwall, England, United Kingdom. The village is approximately three miles (5 km) south of Newquay. The name St Newlyn East is locally abbreviated to Newlyn East and according to an anonymous historian writing in The Cornishman in 1880 it was only in recent years that Saint had been added to the parish name.

The parish is named after the patron saint of the church, St Newlina, and the population was 1,390 in the 2001 census, which had increased to 1,635 at the 2011 census. There is also an electoral ward named Newlyn and Goonhavern which following the 2011 census had a population of 4,933.

The Lappa Valley Steam Railway tourist attraction operates near Newlyn East. At Trerice is the Tudor mansion of the Arundells now in the care of the National Trust. To the northeast is Tresillian House.

The village has a primary school.

== Church of St Newlina and the Manor of Cargoll ==
The church was founded in Norman times and rededicated in 1259. Most of the present building is of the 14th and 15th centuries. There is a fine Norman font. The mutilated head of a medieval lantern cross was found buried in the churchyard in 1959. William Borlase left a description of a lantern cross he had seen at Treledra (Treluddra) Farm; it is probable that these two crosses are the same.

Cargoll Farm Barn is a listed 15th century barn which belonged to the manor of Cargoll. The manor was recorded in the Domesday Book (1086); it was then held by Robert, Count of Mortain, from Bodmin Monastery. There were two hides of land and land for 15 ploughs. The lord held land for 3 ploughs with 16 serfs, and 16 villeins and 22 smallholders had land for 6 ploughs. There was also a mill which paid 2/6, 4 acres of woodland and 2 square leagues of pasture. The livestock was 12 mares, 7 cattle, 7 pigs, 60 sheep and 12 goats. The value of the manor was £3 sterling though it had formerly been worth £10.

This manor and the advowson of the church were purchased by Walter Branscombe (Bishop of Exeter) in 1269 from the Valletorts. The lands of the manor were extensive and it is likely that the bishop's palace within the manor was at Lanner in the parish of St Allen, rather than at Cargoll itself. In 1283, the manor was appropriated by Bishop Peter Quivel to the chancellorship of the cathedral and thereafter several generous gifts were made to the church by the chancellors.

At Cargoll, a fair and annual market were held from the year 1311 onwards.

== East Wheal Rose disaster ==
On 9 July 1846, a disaster at the East Wheal Rose mine was caused by an unusually heavy thunderstorm which flooded the mine. Thirty-nine of the miners (mainly inhabitants of the village and its immediate vicinity) were drowned. The mine eventually closed in 1886.

The St Newlyn East Pit was already in existence at the time of the mining disaster and was used by a local preacher to preach sermons, as it provided shelter when the weather was inclement. It was originally an abandoned quarry and was also used for Cornish wrestling. After the mining disaster, the pit was graded into tiers and dedicated to the memory of those who died in the disaster. It was restored with the aid of lottery funds in about 2003. More recently, the lease was taken over by the Parish Council and a new Management Committee formed to manage and promote the use of the Pit.

== St Newlyn East Wartime Weekend ==
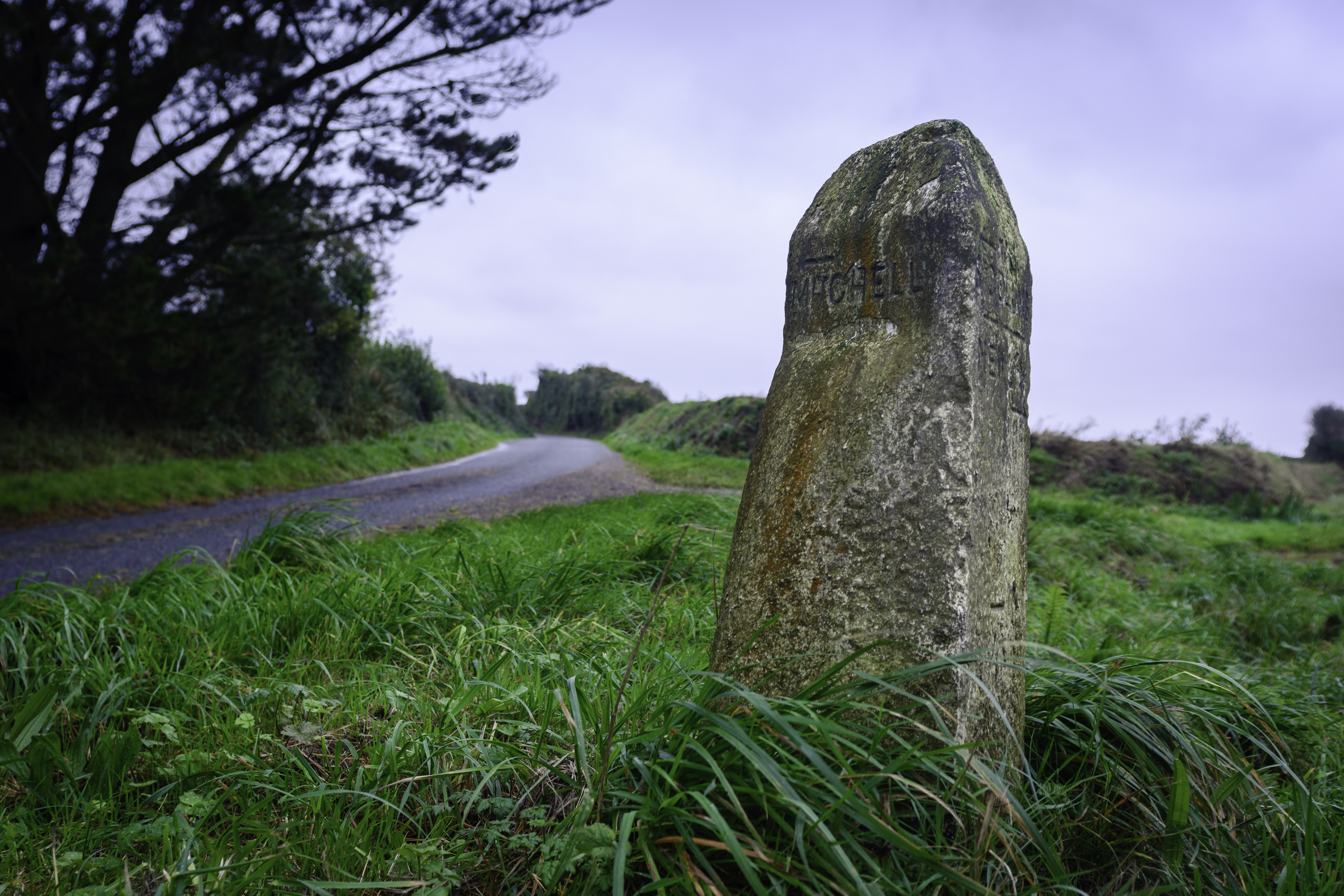
A waymarking stone by the roadside

St Newlyn East is known for the annual St Newlyn East Wartime Weekend which takes place at the village recreational field and village hall.

== Cornish wrestling ==
Cornish wrestling tournaments, for prizes, have been held in Newlyn East for centuries. Tournaments were held at Newlyn Pit, the Royal Standard Hotel, Fiddler's Green and New Inn.

== Notable people ==
- Mary Watson, born at Fiddlers' Green, near St Newlyn East, emigrated to Australia. She was 21 years old and had been married less than eighteen months when she died of thirst on No. 5 Island in the Howick Group off Cape Flattery in the north of Queensland, Australia, in 1881.
