= Rainsbrook Valley Railway =

Miniature railway in Warwickshire, England

Coordinates: 52.350856°N 1.248422°W

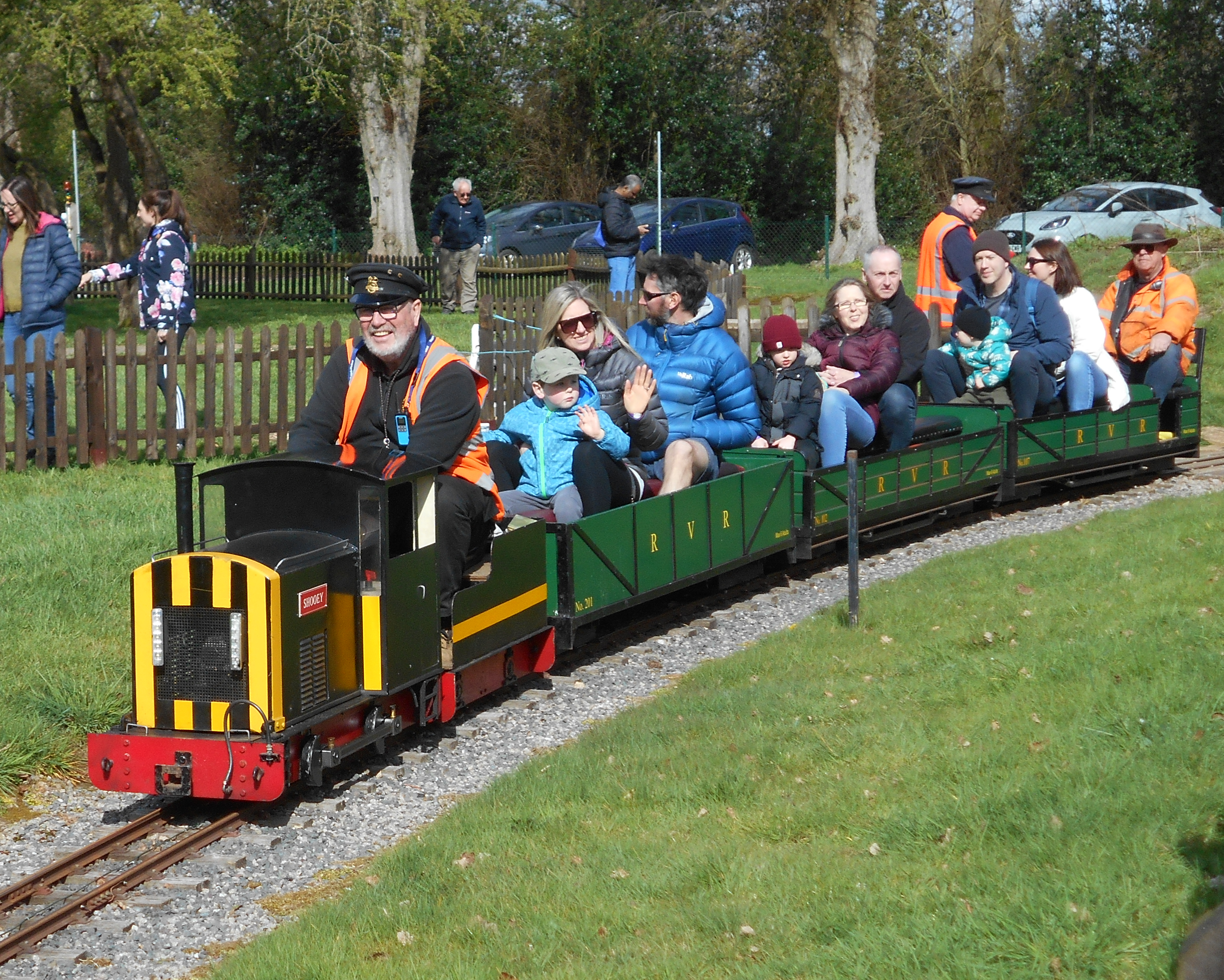
A train on the 7.25 Inch track on the railway

The Rainsbrook Valley Railway is a ridable miniature railway just south of Rugby, Warwickshire.

== Features ==
The railway runs on an 11 acres (4.5 ha) site, and features two tracks, one is a ground level track around 1 mile (1.6 km) long which has a track gauge of 7 1/4 in (184 mm), the second is a raised track around 800 yards (730 m) long, which has a mixed track gauge of 5 in (127 mm), 3 1/2 in (89 mm) and 2 1/2 in (64 mm).

There is a clubhouse which contains a cafeteria, a ticket office and toilets.

The railway is open to the public for various open days and children's parties, between April and October.

== History ==
The railway is run by the non-profit Rugby Model Engineering Society, which was founded in 1949. It previously ran short miniature railways at various locations in Rugby, most notably at Hillmorton Community Centre, before moving to its current site off Onley Lane in 1982.

== Gallery ==
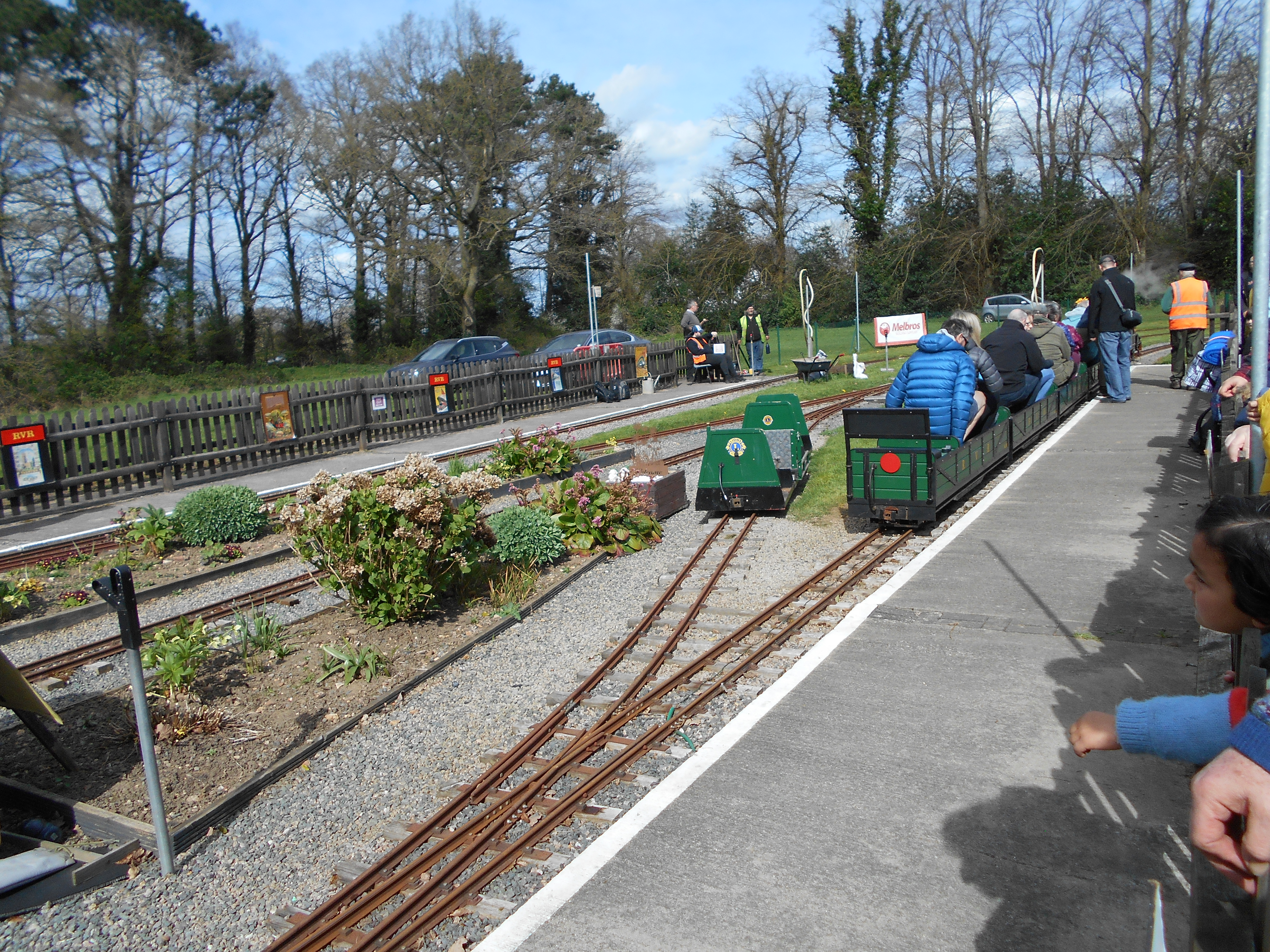
Station at the railway

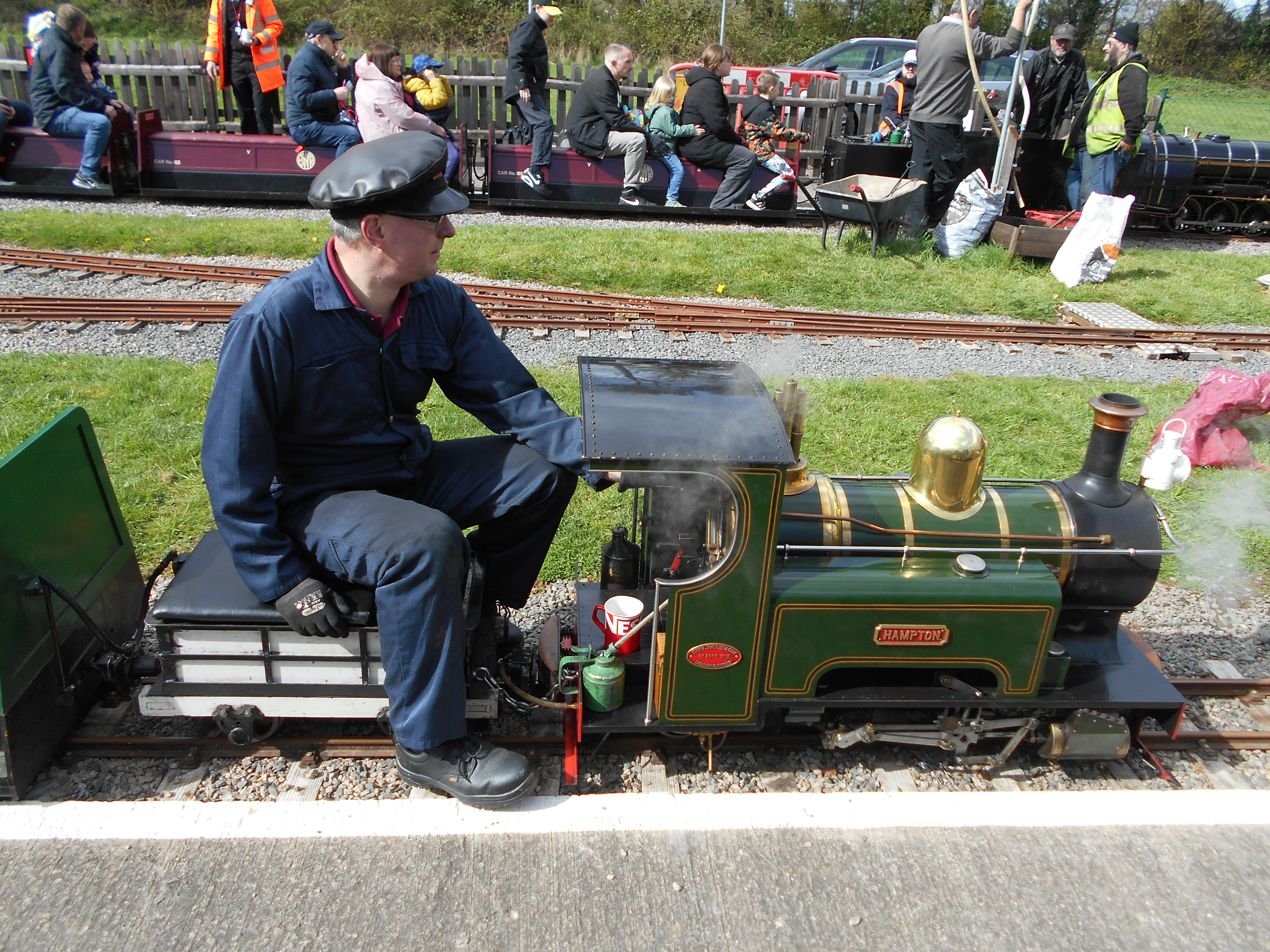
7.25 Inch gauge steam locomotive

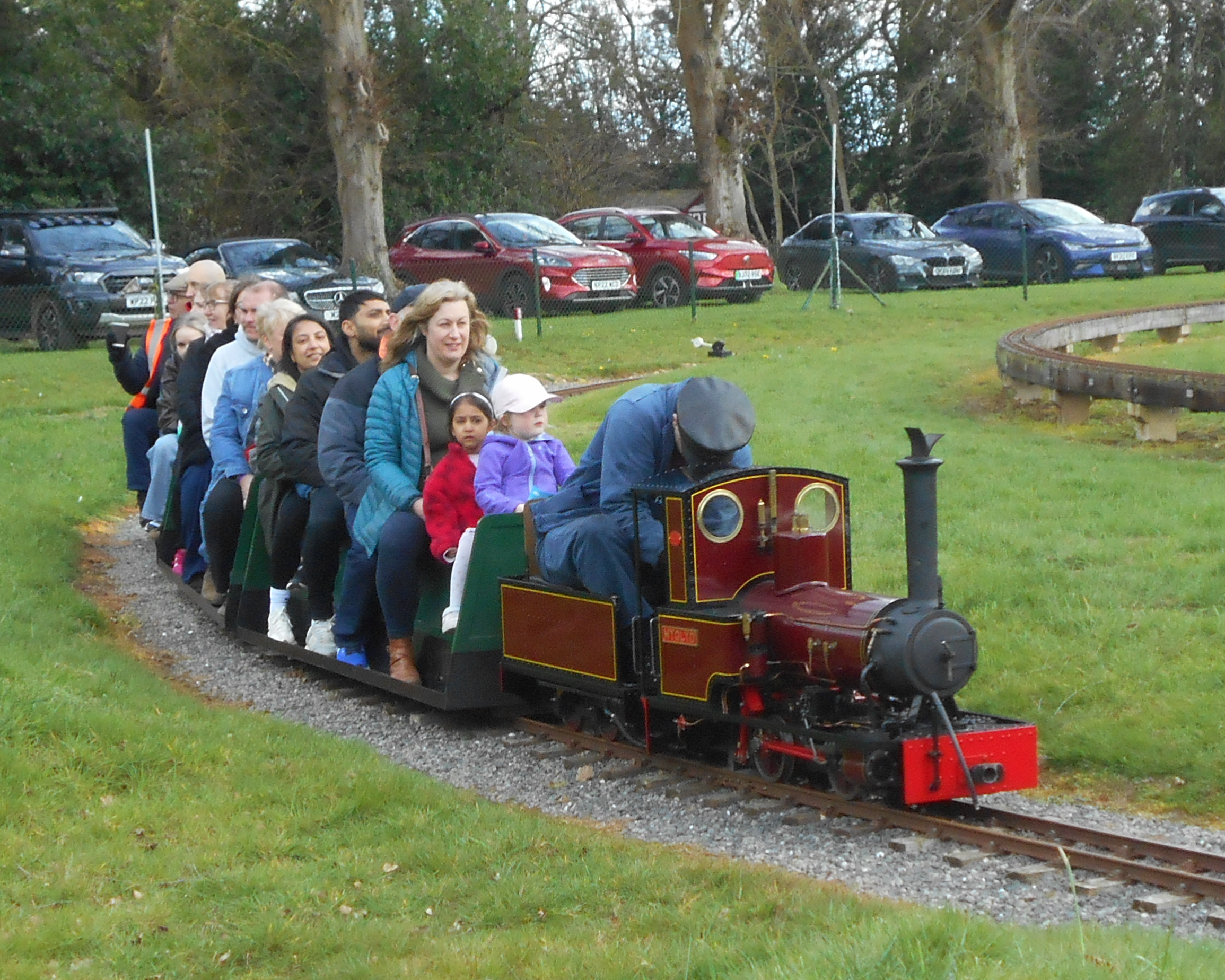
7.25 Inch gauge steam locomotive pulling train

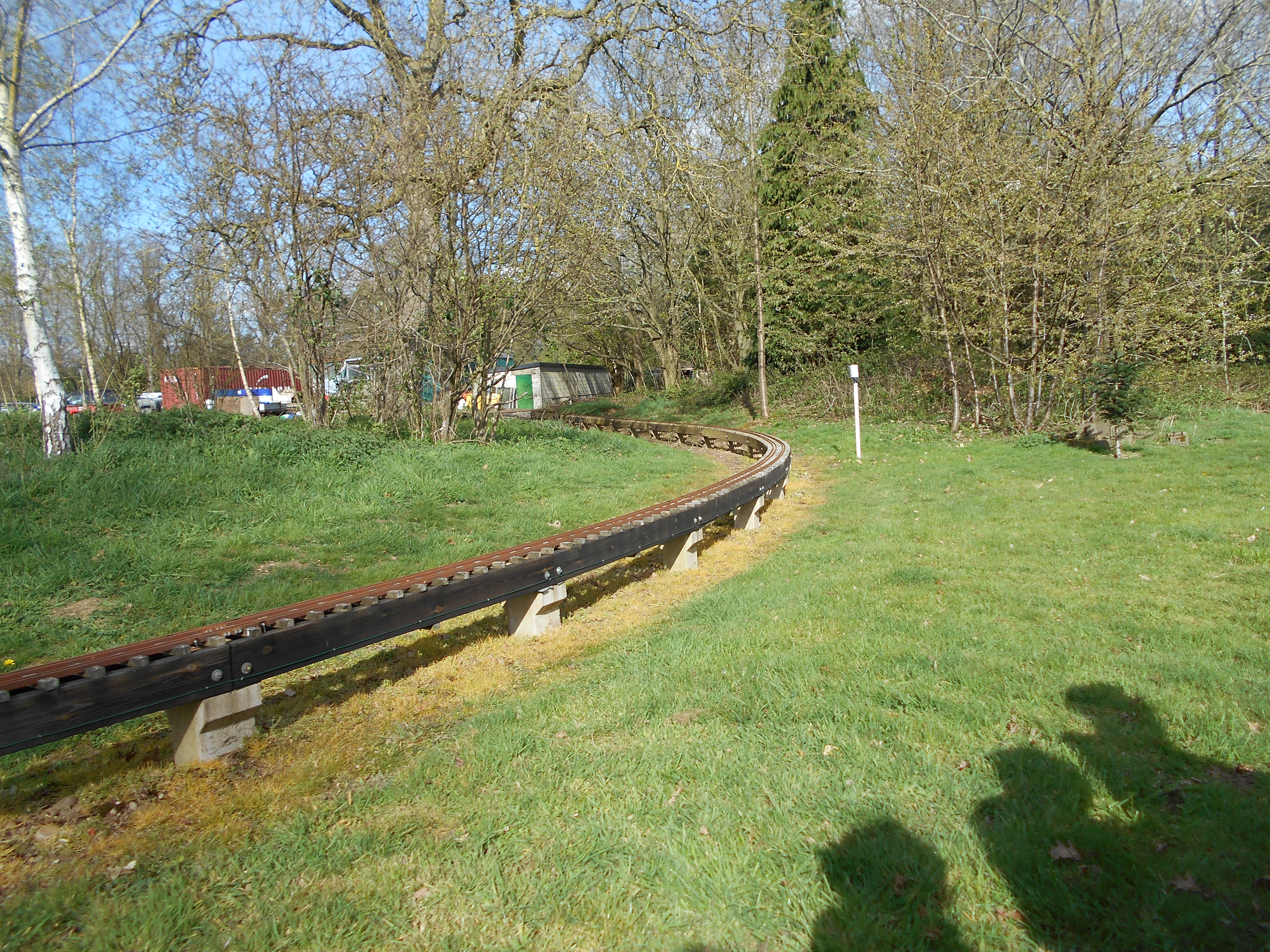
Raised mixed gauge track

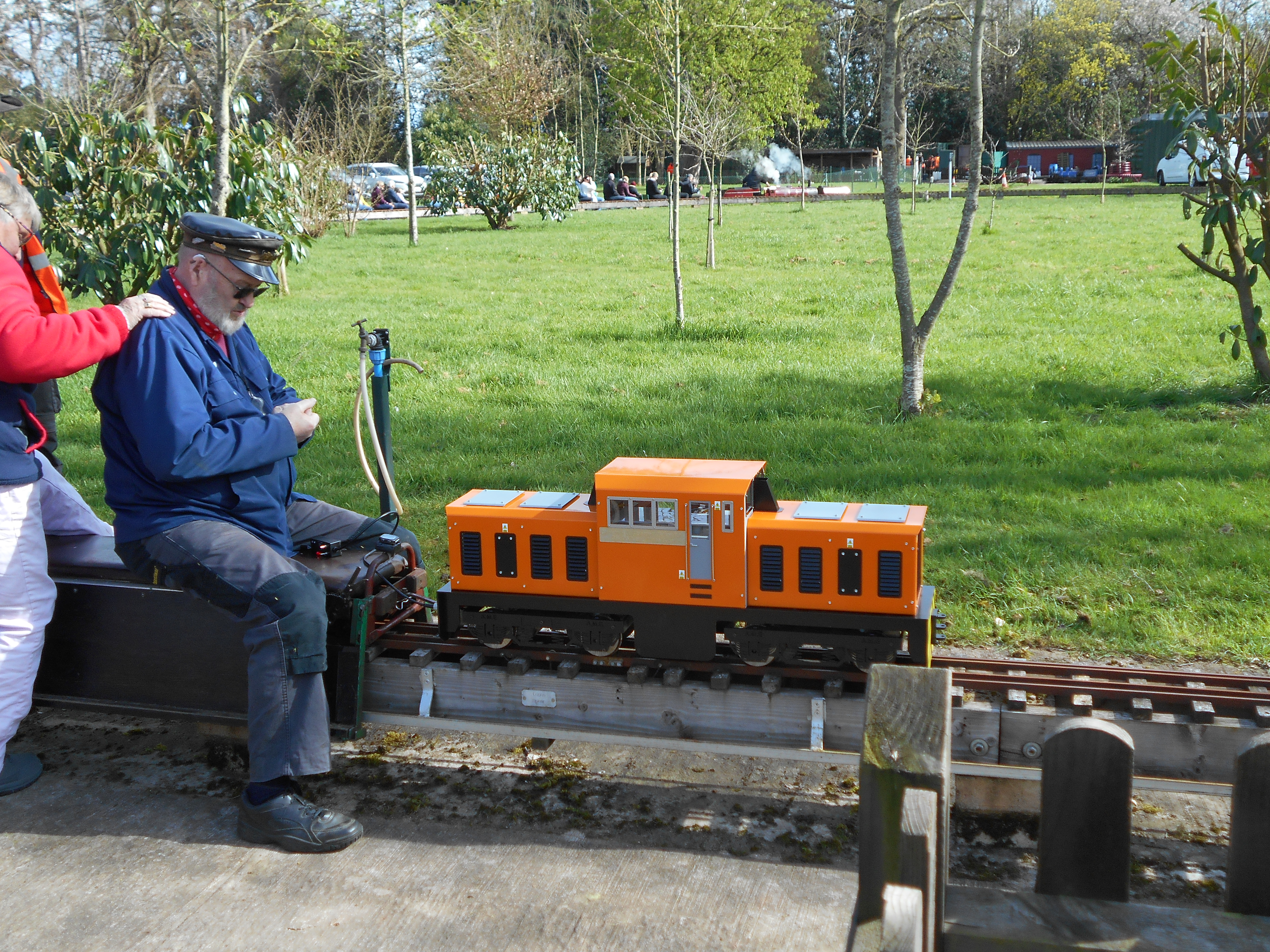
Battery locomotive on the raised track
