= Baguley valve gear =

Steam locomotive motion mechanism

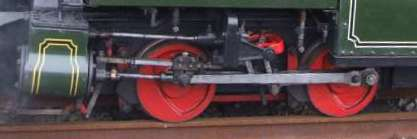
Modified Baguley valve gear on Rishra locomotive

The Baguley valve gear is a type of steam engine valve gear invented by Ernest E. Baguley, the Chief Draughtsman of the W.G. Bagnall company of locomotive manufacturers and patented in 1893. It was used by Bagnall during Baguley's time there, then by his own company of Baguley Cars Ltd.

== History ==
The valve gear was invented by Ernest E. Baguley, the Chief Draughtsman of the W.G. Bagnall company of locomotive manufacturers and patented in 1893. A modified version was introduced in 1895 which eliminated a curved link.

Following Baguley's departure from Bagnall's in 1901 that company developed the Bagnall–Price valve gear which was primarily based on Walschaerts valve gear. Baker identifies one common feature retained from Baguley in Bagnall–Price: "the application of the lap and lead motion by oscillating the expansion link (or sector) bodily, and thus superimposing this motion on the. normal die block travel, the lead remaining constant in all positions of the gear."

Baguley formed his own company, Baguley Cars Ltd, in 1911, which constructed internal combustion engine vehicles. In 1920 a petrol-hydraulic engine, works No. 621, which had been started in 1914 but delayed by World War One, was completed as an 0-4-0ST steam locomotive works No. 2001 with original Baguley valve gear, the only standard gauge locomotive to ever be so fitted. The Company went on to complete 30 more steam locomotives through to 1928 all of which were fitted with Baugley value gear, mostly the modified variant.

== Operation ==
The valve gear is used to operate the inlet and outlet valves of reciprocating steam locomotives. It uses a rocking sector whose motion is driven via a link from a crankpin between the coupling and connecting rods. The ends of this link are circular and offset from the pivots. On these circular bosses the sector is oscillated by a second link from the rod to an extension to the rear of the sector.

== Locomotives with Baguley valve gear ==
Only a few locomotives with Baguley valve gear remain, the list is known to include:

- Isabel at Amerton Railway, an 0-4-0ST built in 1897 by W. G. Bagnall.
- Ledo Coal Mines 885 at the National Rail Museum, New Delhi, a 0-4-0ST built in 1897 by W. G. Bagnall.
- Rishra at the Leighton Buzzard Light Railway, an 0-4-0T built in 1921 by Baguley.
- Sea Lion at the Groudle Glen Railway, a 2-4-0T built in 1896 by W. G. Bagnall.
