= Rishra (locomotive) =

Small heritage 0-4-0T industrial steam locomotive

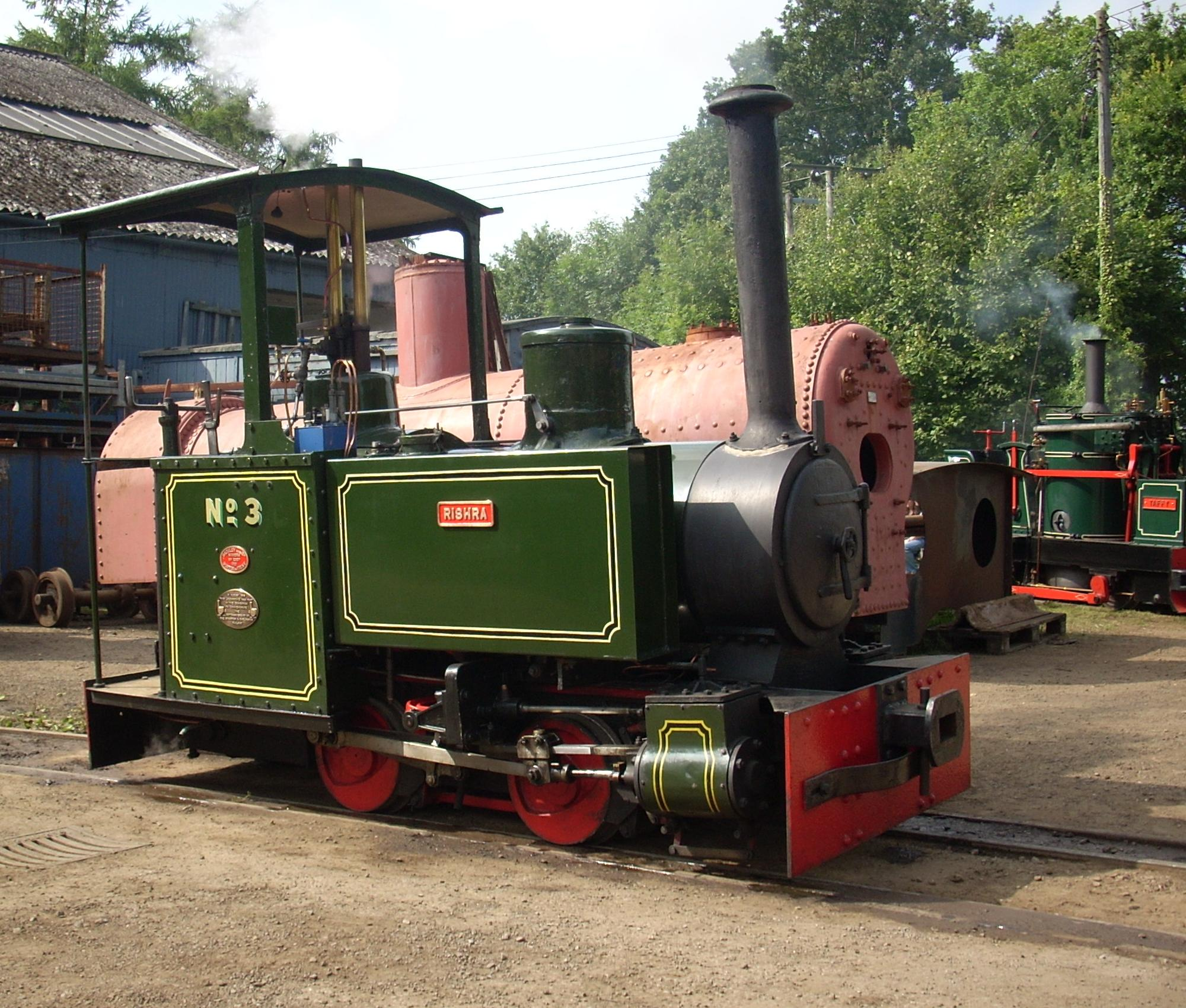
- Rishra at the Alan Keef open day in 2008
Type and origin
- Power type: Steam
- Builder: Baguley Cars Ltd
- Serial number: 2007
- Build date: 1921
Specifications
- Configuration
  - Whyte: 0-4-0T
- Gauge: 2 ft (610 mm)
- Fuel type: coal
- Valve gear: Baguley valve gear

Rishra (works number 2007) was built in 1921 by Baguley Cars Ltd. Following a working life in India it is now preserved at the Leighton Buzzard Light Railway, Bedfordshire, England.

It is the one of only 31 Baguley steam locomotives built.

== History ==
Baguley Cars Ltd took the order on 7 July 1919 for their works number 2007 2 ft (610 mm) 0-4-0T locomotive and delivered in on 28 November 1921 to Light Railways Ltd.

The locomotive was used by the Calcutta Corporation for shunting coal wagons at a water pumping station in Barrackpore, India.

Left abandoned in undergrowth, it was rescued in 1963 by Michael Satow (Note: Satow founded the Indian National Rail Museum in New Delhi.), a senior executive of Imperial Chemical Industries (ICI), who had the locomotive restored at the Hooghly Docking and Engineering Company, Rishra, Kolkata (Calcutta). (Note: It seems likely this is the origin of naming of the locative as Rishra.)

It was repatriated to the Leighton Buzzard Light Railway in England by Satow in 1971.

It is one of only four preserved locomotives fitted with Baguley valve gear, similar to the Bagnall-Price gear which was adopted by Bagnall after Ernest E. Baguley left that firm.
