= Ryknield Motor Company =

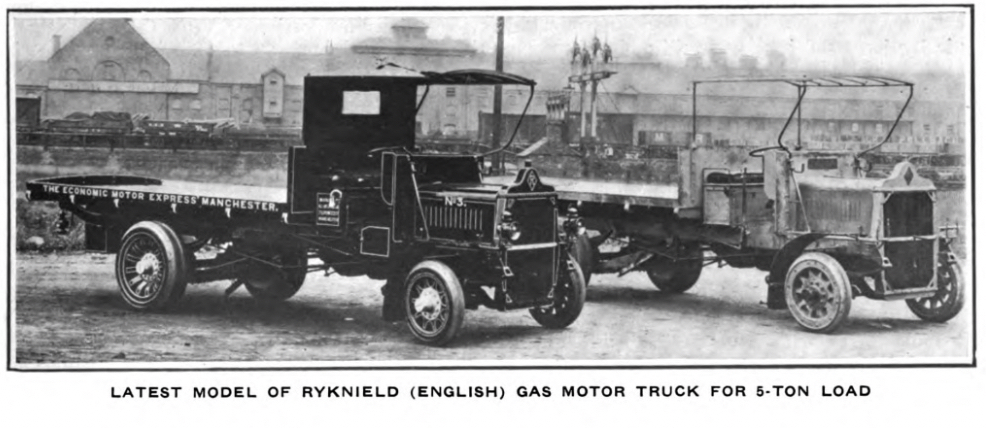
Ryknield Truck (1909) 45 hp

The Ryknield Motor Company, originally established as the Ryknield Engine Company was a short-lived motor car manufacturer of the early twentieth century. Based in Burton-upon-Trent in England, the company was formed by a number of prominent business men in February 1902. Ernest E. Baguley, who had apprenticed in the rail industry with Hawthorn Leslie and Company, and then W. G. Bagnall, saw the potential of the motor car, and in 1901, Baguley designed a steam-engine for a motor car. His employer at the time, Bagnalls, were not interested in the concept, so he left the company and joined the Ryknield Engine Company as manager in November 1902.

The company established a factory on Shobnall Road in Burton, and they started producing cars in 1903, offering both petrol and steam engines as options. The company primarily targeted the cheaper end of the market, and produced a 10-horsepower car, with options either as a four-seater, or a light delivery van. This was later supplemented with 15 and 20 horsepower models, and in 1905 one of the 15 horsepower cars was entered into the 1905 International Tourist Trophy by Arthur Clay, and was one of only eighteen cars to complete the endurance race. In late 1905, the company endured financial difficulties, and was eventually sold to Wilfred Clay, who had set up the Ryknield Motor Company in early 1906. In contrast to the cars that had previously been produced, the new company targeted the commercial market. The connections of the Clay family, along with the booming brewery business in Burton-upon-Trent, gave the company a good market for their trucks. They were able to adapt the chassis of the 10 horsepower car to produce a small, one ton, truck, while a larger, 8 litre, 35 horsepower model was manufactured for longer distance journeys. They manufactured an even bigger truck, with a 9.8 litre engine, and trialled a motor bus. However, the company was not particularly successful, and in mid-1910, the company was placed in receivership, and was sold to Baguley Cars, which had both Wilfred Clay and Ernest Baguley on its board, the latter as managing director.
