= Baguley Cars Ltd =

British automotive and locomotive manufacturer

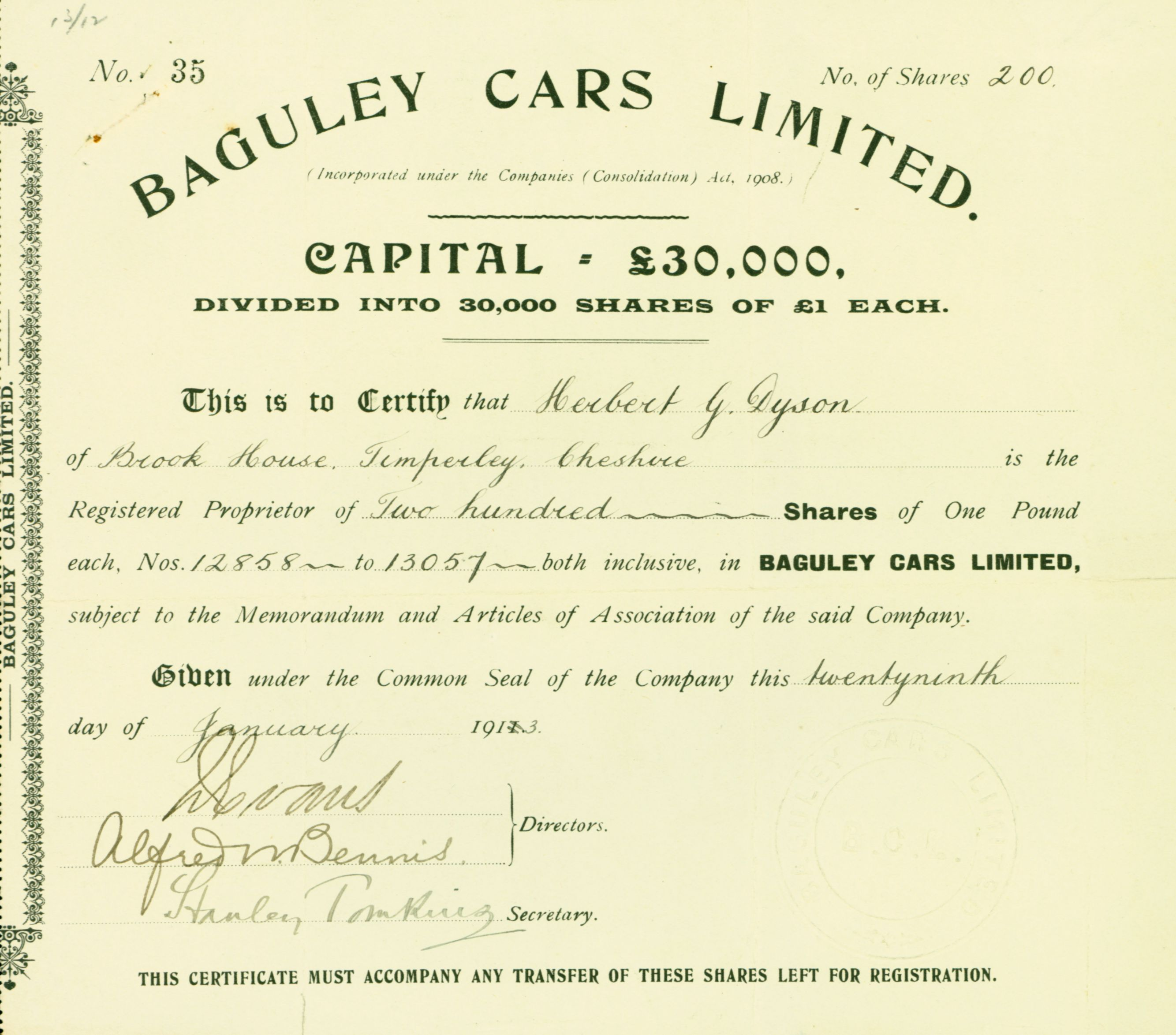
Share of the Baguley Cars Ltd, issued 29 January 1913

Baguley Cars Ltd (later Baguley (Engineers) Ltd, then E. E. Baguley Ltd) was a British engineering company, specialising in railway locomotives. it was founded in 1911 by Ernest E. Baguley and subsequently acquired by Drewry Car Co to form Baguley-Drewry in 1964.

== Baguley Cars Ltd. ==
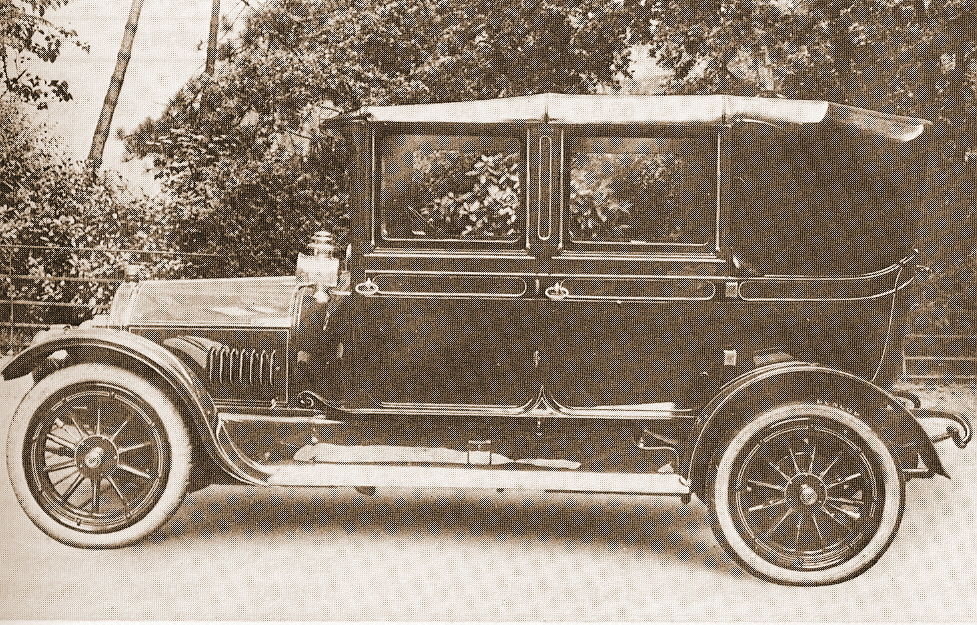
Baguley Cars 1914 4-cylinder car

In 1911, engineer Ernest E. Baguley set up Baguley Cars Ltd, taking over the assets of the (then defunct) Ryknield Motor Company at Shobnall Road Works, Burton-on-Trent. The company produced a range of motor vehicles.

In 1912, Baguely entered into an agreement with the Drewry Car Co. to manufacture railcars for Drewry from 1912. The same year, Baguley acquired the stock, order books, designs and patents of McEwan Pratt, which was in liquidation. Baguley formed a new subsidiary - McEwan Pratt (1912) Ltd - to fulfill existing orders. Leonard Bentall, the McEwan Pratt draughtsman, became the chief draughtsman of Baguley and led the design of future Baguley and McEwan Pratt locomotives, which shared many common features. Robert McEwan also joined Baguley, where he worked until 1921.

The company did not follow the 'normal' practice of building steam first and then diesel or petrol, but started in the opposite fashion, not building their first steam rail engine until 1919. But even this was almost an 'accident', as the locomotive was intended to be a petrol hydraulic machine but the transmission components were held up because of the 1914 - 18 war, so it was converted to a steam engine. Altogether the company built some 31 steam locos.

=== Baguley (Engineers) Ltd ===
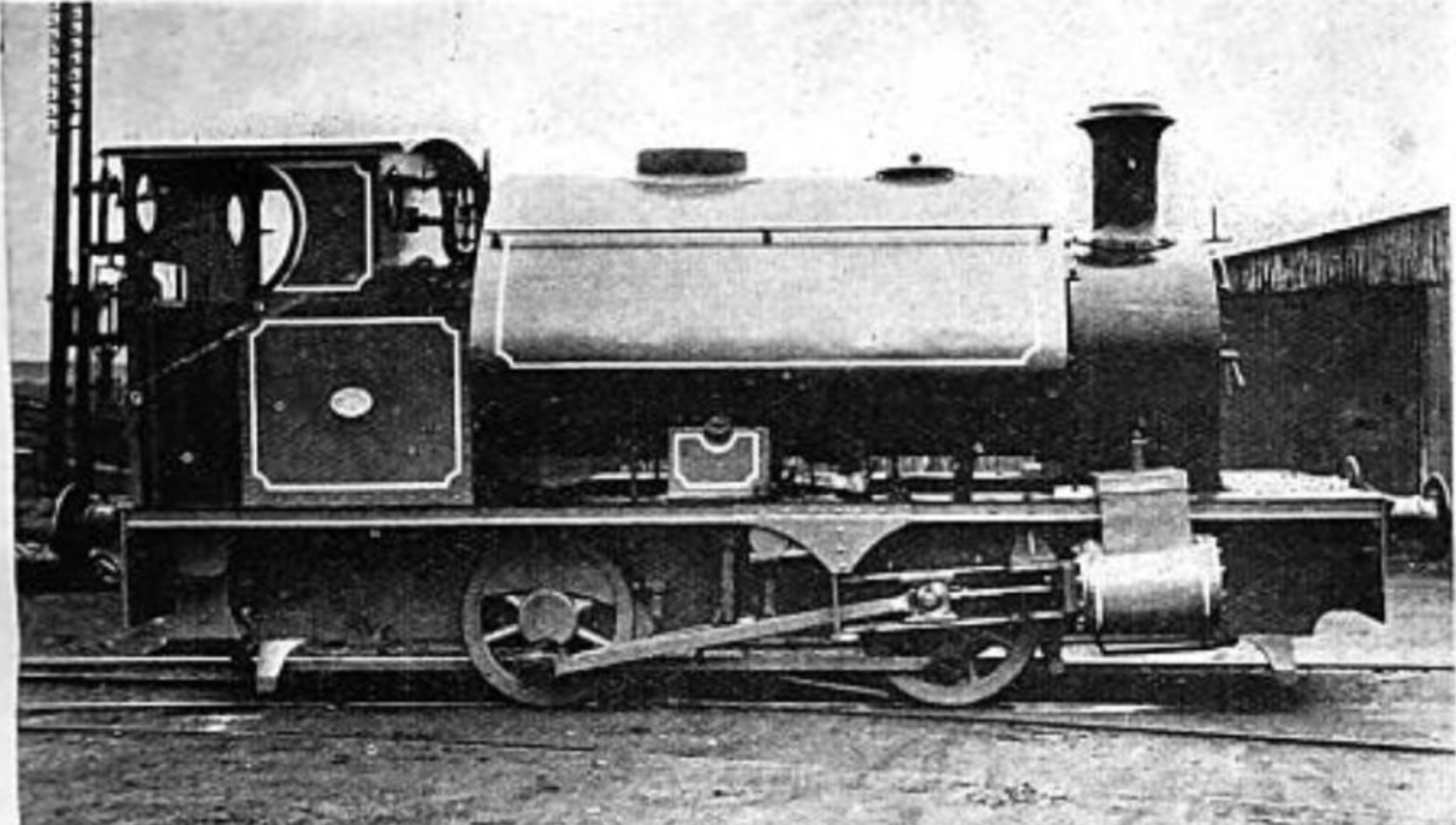
0-4-0ST built in 1927. Started as a petrol locomotive and converted to steam during construction

After the War there was a decline in the production of road vehicles (probably due to competition from other manufacturers) and an increase in the production of railway equipment. Because of this, the name of the company was changed from Baguley Cars Ltd to Baguley (Engineers) Ltd on 10 April 1923. Despite the formal name change, the company continued to use the Baguley Cars Ltd. name for several more years. W.E.C. Souster took over as managing director of the company, having worked his way up from office boy.

During the 1920s there was some friction because Drewry complained that Baguley was failing to produce more modern designs of engine and chassis. Drewry began to move their business to the English Electric Company. Baguley (Engineers) Ltd went into decline and entered liquidation in 1931. Most of the plant and effects were sold at auction on 10 November 1931.

=== E. E. Baguley Ltd ===
W.E.C Souster and his brother Frederick C. Souster, revived the company shortly after its liquidation with W.E.C serving as chairman and the brothers as co-managing directors. The new company was called E. E. Baguley Ltd. and was located at Clarence Street, Burton-on-Trent; it was registered on 30 April 1932. Initially the company was a repair business for Baguley products, but it soon expanded into locomotive production. In 1934 E. E. Baguley Ltd. moved to larger premises at Uxbridge Street, Burton-on-Trent. This company survived until January 1964, when it was acquired by Drewry Cars Ltd to form Baguley-Drewry Ltd.

== Preserved locomotives ==
The following Baguley locomotives are known to have been preserved:

Name	Gauge	Type	Date	Works number	Image	Notes	Location
		0-4-0PM	1920	800			Tyseley Locomotive Works
	4 ft 8 1/2 in (1,435 mm)	0-4-0PM	1916	680		Spent most its working life at Jacobs factory, withdrawn in 1968. Originally had 60/55 hp petrol/paraffin White & Poppe engine, replaced by 40 hp Baguley in 1927	Statfold Barn Railway
TIP No.1	750 mm (2 ft 5 1/2 in)	0-4-2T	1920/21				Ko Kha District, Thailand
TIP No.8	750 mm (2 ft 5 1/2 in)	0-4-2T	1921	2009			Wang Kaphi sugar refinery, Thailand
		0-6-0D	1938	3018		Steam outline	East Links family park, Dunbar
Marston, Thompson and Evershed No. 4	4 ft 8 1/2 in (1,435 mm)	0-4-0DM	1955	3140			Chasewater Railway
Rishra	2 ft (610 mm)	0-4-0T	1921	2007			Leighton Buzzard Light Railway
Altonia	2 ft (610 mm)	0-4-0PM	1929	1769		Built for the Lilleshall Hall railway. Transferred to Alton Towers Park Railway.	Old Kiln Light Railway
Golspie	2 ft (610 mm)	0-4-0PM	1934	3024		Steam outline	Amerton Railway
Dreadnought	2 ft (610 mm)	0-4-0PM	1939	2085		Steam outline	Amerton Railway
Chattenden	2 ft 6 in (762 mm)	0-6-0DM	1947	2263		ex-Chattenden and Upnor Railway	Welshpool and Llanfair Light Railway
No. 760	2 ft (610 mm)	0-4-0PM	1918	760		10 hp McEwan Pratt design built for the Timber Supply Department. Purchased by Rich Morris in 1965. Displayed at Gloddfa Ganol until 1998, when sold to the Abbey Light Railway	Welsh Highland Heritage Railway
Oakeley	2 ft (610 mm)	0-4-0PM	1919	774		Built for the Pennal timber tramway. Purchased by Oakeley quarry in 1927. Bought by Rich Morris in 1970, and displayed at Gloddfa Ganol until 1998	Narrow Gauge Railway Museum.
No. 646	600 mm (1 ft 11 5/8 in)	0-4-0PM	1918	646		10 hp McEwan Pratt design built for the Timber Supply Department. At Gloddfa Ganol until 1998	Moseley Railway Trust
No. 736	600 mm (1 ft 11 5/8 in)	0-4-0PM	1918	736		10 hp McEwan Pratt design built for the Timber Supply Department. At Gloddfa Ganol until 1998, sold to the Abbey Light Railway	Welsh Highland Heritage Railway
Draisine D7 RFR	4 ft 8 1/2 in (1,435 mm)	0-4-0	1917			Montabon roundhouse	

== Sources ==
- "The Drewry Car Company:1906-1970". Industrial Railway Record (40). Industrial Railway Society. 1972.
- Marsden, Colin J. (2003). The Diesel Shunter. Oxford Publishing. ISBN 0-86093-579-5.
