= Double Arches Pit =

Disused sand quarry in Bedfordshire, England

Coordinates: 51.953°N 0.641°W

- Site of Special Scientific Interest
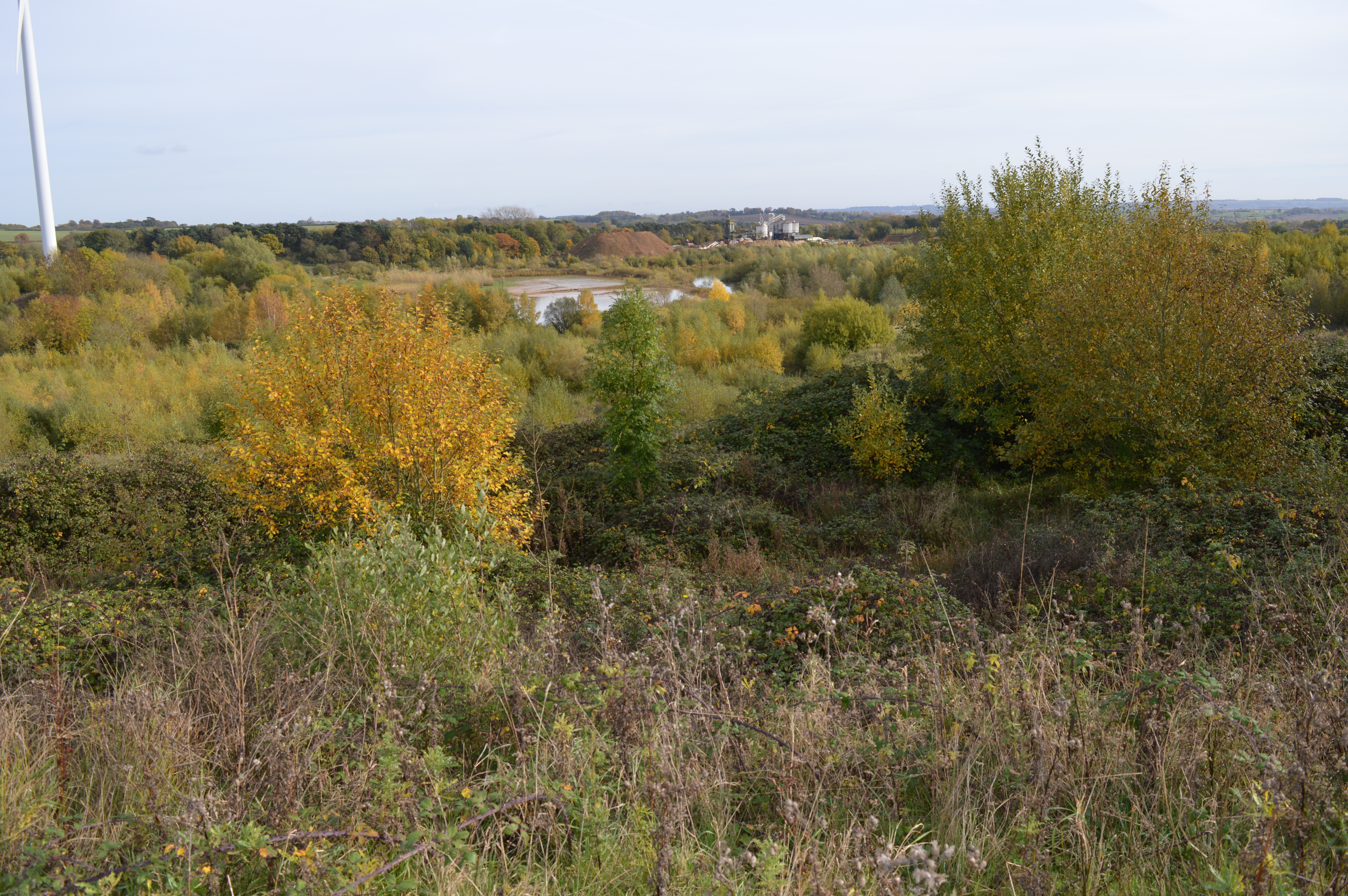
- Location of Double Arches Pit.
- Area of search: Bedfordshire
- Grid reference: SP936292
- Interest: Geological
- Area: 1.6 ha (4.0 acres)
- Notification date: 1988
- Location map: Magic Map

Double Arches Pit (formerly known as New Trees Pit) was a sand quarry near the village and civil parish of Heath and Reach, Bedfordshire, England. It is now a Site of Special Scientific Interest and a Geological Conservation Review site.

== History ==
Archaeological excavations have concluded that a good-sized Roman settlement existed there, with multiple pieces of pottery and a Roman well being discovered.

The pit was opened by J. Arnold & Sons Limited in 1916. In 1927, the site was subject to a valuation in accordance with the Rating and Valuation Act 1925 (15 & 16 Geo. 5. c. 90). The valuer who visited the site recorded its size as 19.149 acres (7.749 ha). The following is an extract from his notes:

Saw foreman 22/8/27. Pit started during war. Plenty of sand, but has run out on east side near brook. Untopping now about 12 feet, increasing. About fifteen men working. Does not know output. Sand taken in trucks pulled by engine and horses to road. Light Railway from there. Excellent sand. Sifted for special contracts before it leaves the pit.

The pit was mentioned in an article in the Cement, Lime & Gravel magazine, describing the site as "largest and most important of the Firm's workings", and described the site as having a system of 'locos' used to transport materials around the site. The site used to be the furthest point along the Leighton Buzzard Light Railway that was constructed to provide a means of transporting sand from a series of quarries in the area. The site closed in 1985.

== Site of Special Scientific Interest ==
An application was made to designate the pit a Site of Special Scientific Interest in 1988. The application was made on the basis that it was the best accessible exposure to Lower Greensand and Gault in the Leighton Buzzard area. This helps geologists study fossil and environmental changes in the area's history, particularly for the interval covering the Leymeriella tardefurcata and Douvilleiceras mammillatum ammonite zones. The application also mentions a "unique example of channelling in the junction beds" and "clear development of the Cirripede bed.". A site assessment on 12 February 2008 identified the site to be in a "Favourable" condition, and gave the size as 4.22 acres (1.71 ha).

== Access ==
There is no access to the site but it can be viewed from the Leighton Buzzard Light Railway's Stonehenge Works on Mile Tree Road.
