= Doll (locomotive) =

British steam locomotive

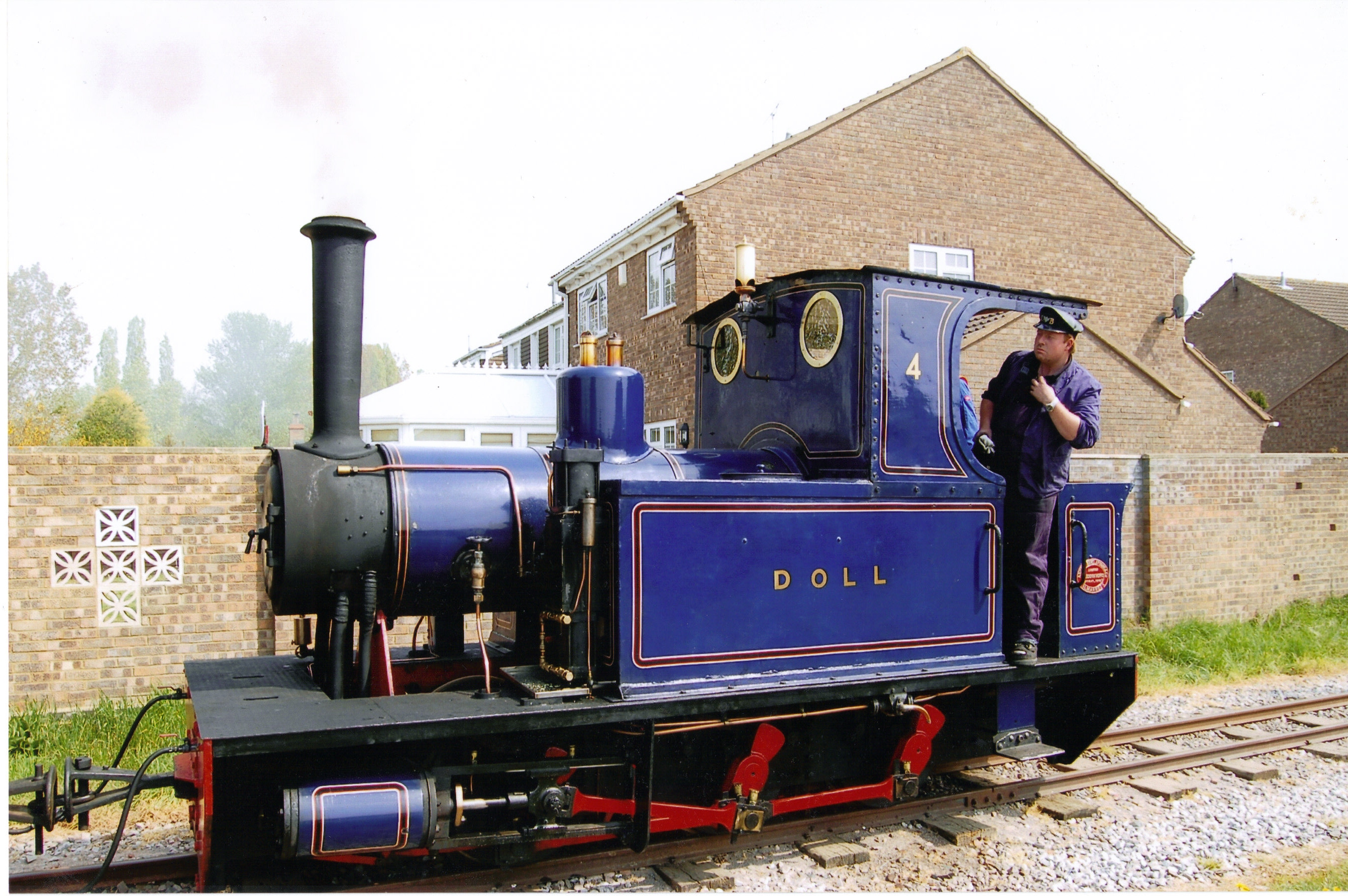
Locomotive No.4 Doll on the Leighton Buzzard Narrow Gauge Railway.

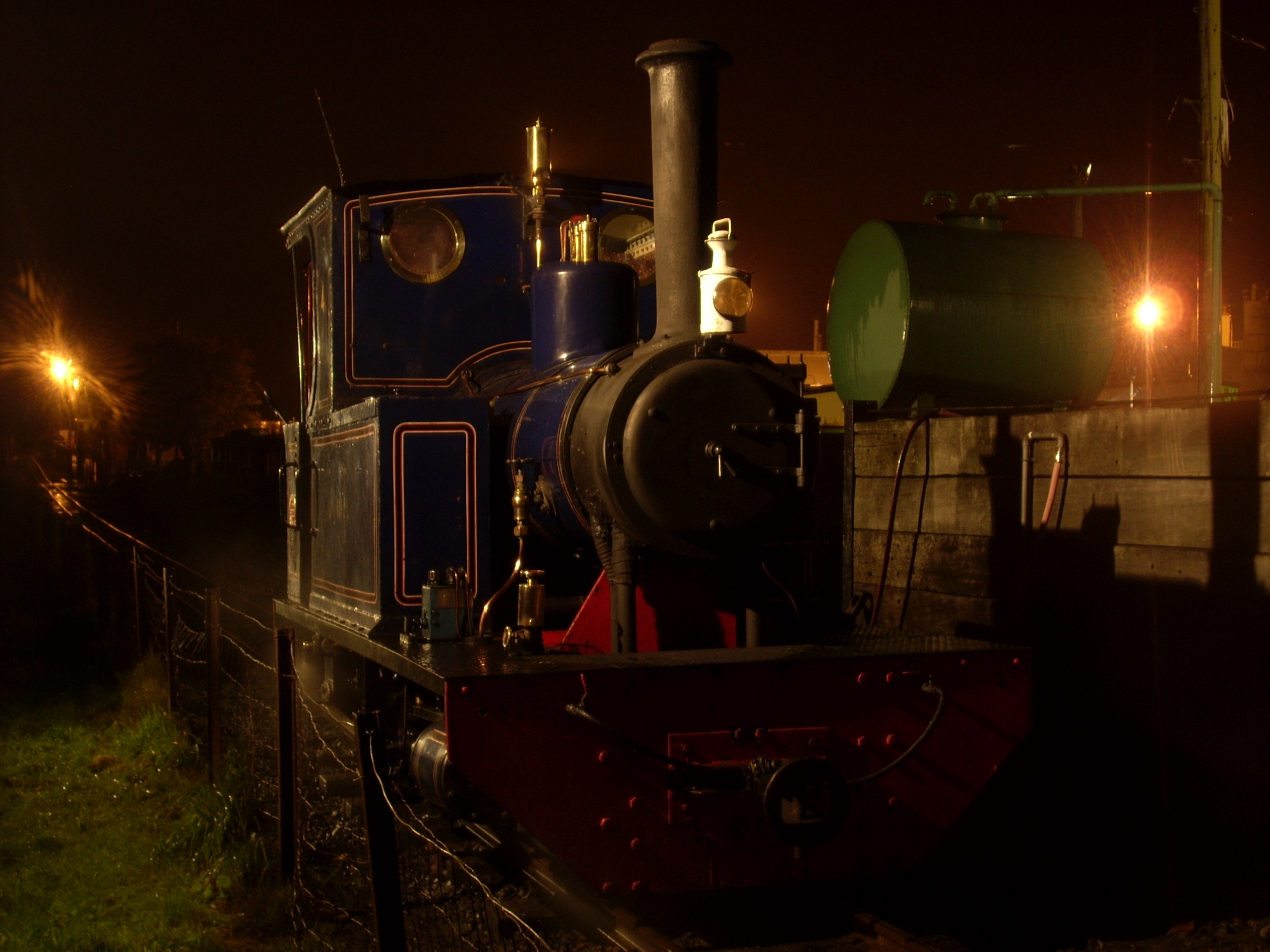
Doll on the Leighton Buzzard Narrow Gauge Railway at the Steam Glow event 2008

Doll is a 2 ft (610 mm) gauge 0-6-0T steam locomotive based at the Leighton Buzzard Narrow Gauge Railway in Bedfordshire.

== History ==
=== Industry ===
Doll was built by Andrew Barclay Sons & Co. in 1919 (works number 1641), and was one of three identical engines built for Hickmanas at Sydenham ironstone quarries, near Banbury in Oxfordshire. The quarries were closed in 1925 following the takeover by Stewarts & Lloyds Minerals in April 1925, and the three engines (named after Hickmans daughters) were transferred to Bilston steelworks, near Wolverhampton. The other two engines were Winifred (AB1424/1915) and Gertrude (AB1578/1918). Gertrude and Doll worked at Bilston until they were withdrawn from service in 1959, but Winifred seems to have been scrapped before 1939.

=== Preservation ===
In 1960, after some negotiations through the avid steam preservationist, Max Sinclair, Doll was moved to the Burton Green & District Light Railway near Kenilworth in Warwickshire, where she was returned to steam in 1962. By 1965, the site at Burton Green was for sale, and the railway was closed. In 1966, Doll was sold to Alan Bloom and she was moved to run at Bressingham Steam and Gardens museum. However, the Nursery Railway at Bressingham was laid to the Penrhyn Quarry Railway gauge of 1 ft 10 3/4 in (578 mm) and Doll is 2 ft (610 mm) gauge with a long fixed wheelbase and she was thus unsuitable for the line. The locomotive was sold to Henry Williams, who in turn sold her to the Leighton Buzzard Light Railway in 1969.

At some point, Doll was temporarily withdrawn from service at the Leighton Buzzard Narrow Gauge Railway, at which point she received a new all-welded boiler from Bennett Boiler and a full bottom end overhaul at Alan Keef Ltd. The valve gear was fitted with new eccentrics and repinned and bushed. It appears that at some point in the locomotive's past the wear had been compensated for by sawing part of the lap from the slide valves and filling in notches in the reversing quadrant near mid-gear. After repair the engine returned to LBNGR and was in regular use from 2004 until the boiler tubes wore out. Doll returned to service in Summer 2017 after another overhaul. In 2019 it was joined at Leighton Buzzard by its sister locomotive, Gertrude.

== Design ==
Doll has Stephenson valve gear and outside frames. The design originated from a requirement for the War Department for a series of similar 0-6-0 locomotives, of which a total of only 16 were built.
