= McEwan Pratt =

Defunct locomotive manufacturer

McEwan, Pratt & Co Ltd
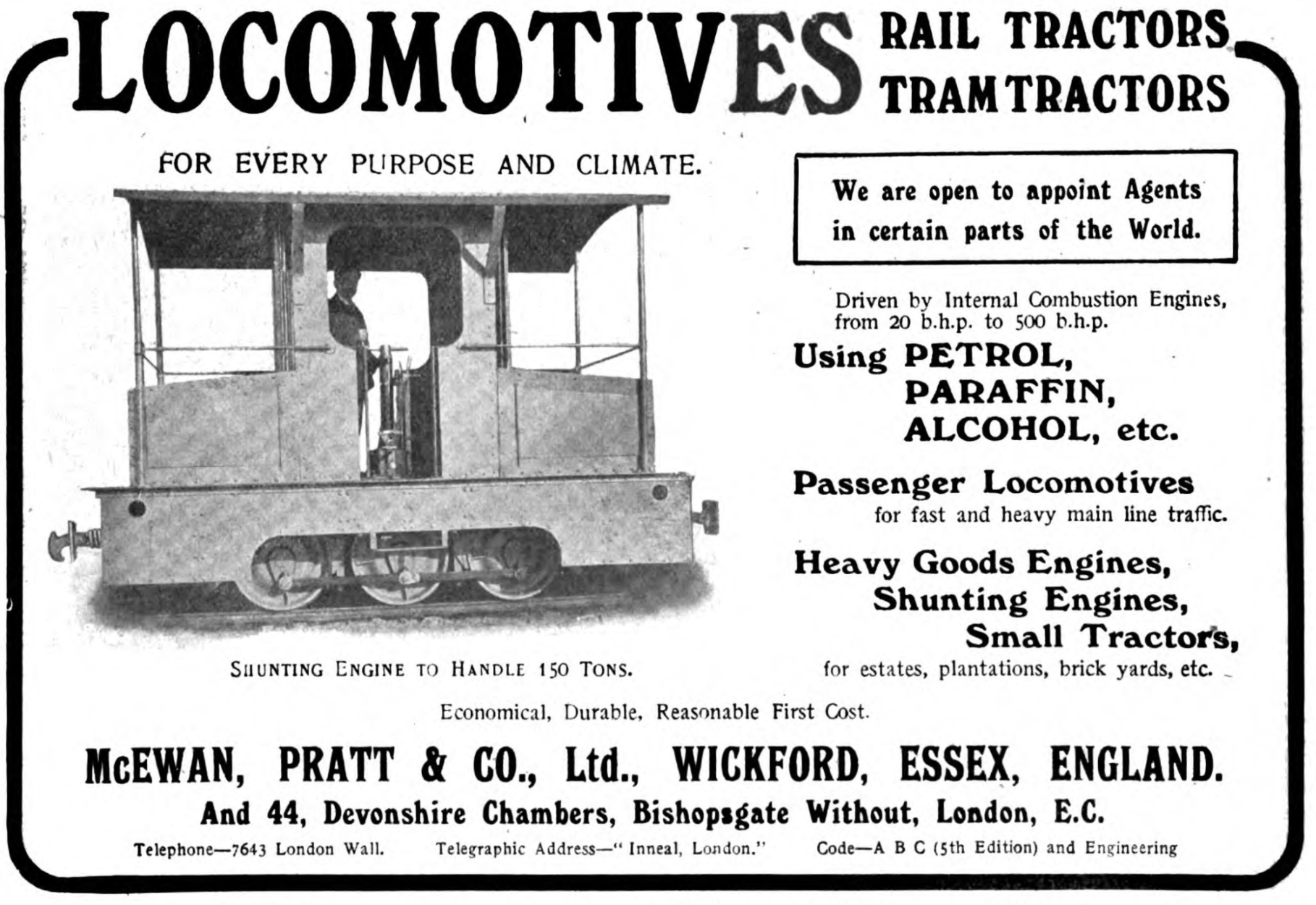
- 1910 ad showing the locomotive for the Assam Oil Company
- Industry: Engineering
- Founded: c1905
- Defunct: 1912
- Successor: Baguley Cars Ltd
- Headquarters: Wickford, United Kingdom
- Products: Shunting locomotives

McEwan Pratt (full name: McEwan, Pratt & Co Ltd) was a manufacturer of narrow-gauge internal combustion locomotives, founded around 1905 in Wickford, Essex. It produced a wide variety of locomotives and railcars, but failed as a business and became a subsidiary of Baguley Cars Ltd in 1912.

== History ==
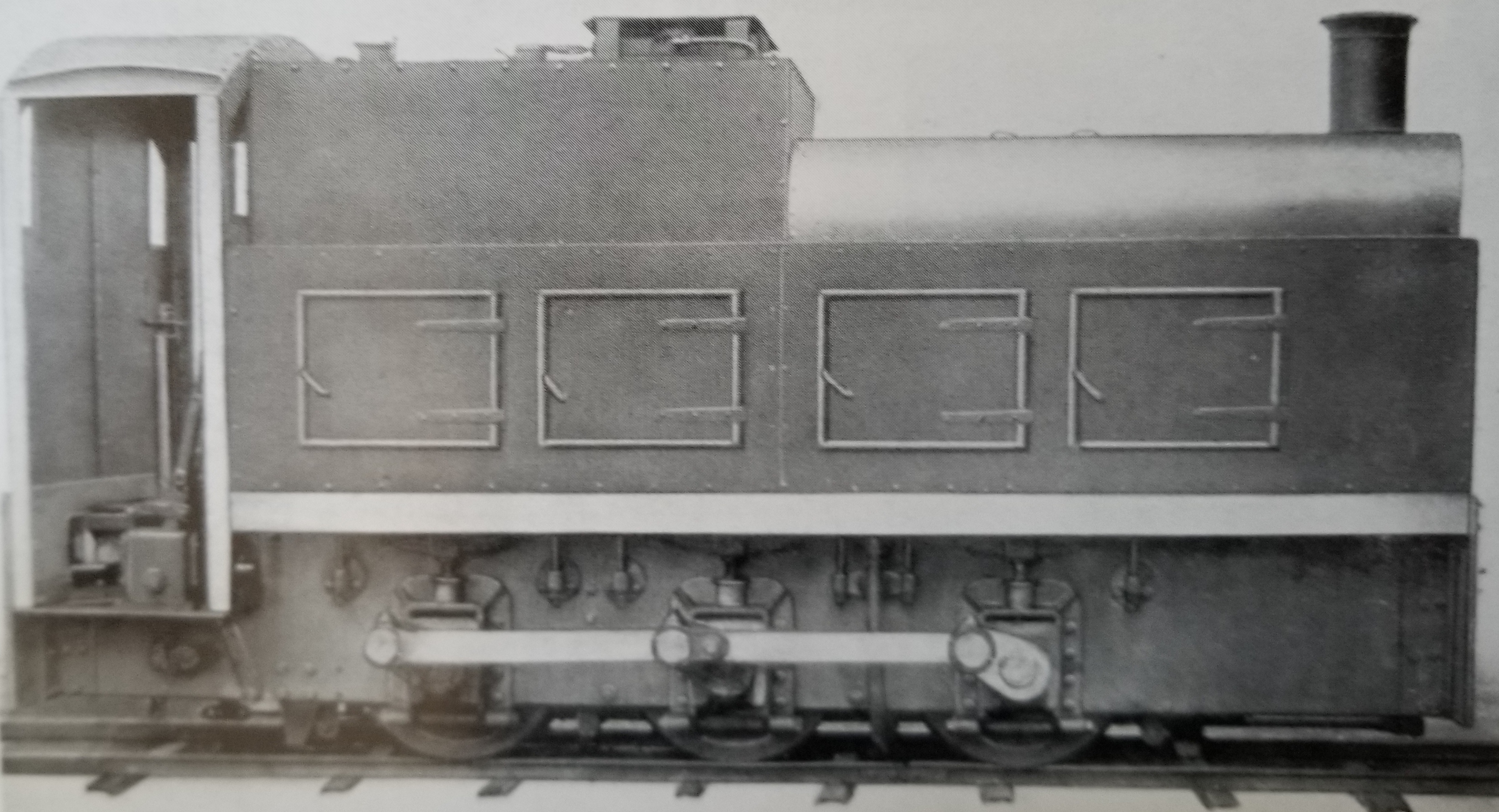
Type P locomotive, supplied to the Chattenden and Upnor Railway in 1909

=== Founding ===
McEwan Pratt was founded in 1905, or shortly afterwards, as a private engineering company, by engineer Robert Henry McEwan, draughtsman Arthur Wellesley Pratt and Robert Davison - who provided financial backing. The company's headquarters was at Wick Lane in Wickford, Essex, and they maintained a London office at 13 South Place, London EC2.

=== Wickford ===
In May 1907, they purchased the 6 acre former Darby Digger factory in Wickford. and started production of small locomotives. The first known product was a 4wPM for a rubber plantation in Java. By December they were exporting vehicles to South Africa, and South America.

McEwan Pratt was noted for its production of railcars, and by 1913 were supplying both finished cars and powered chassis to various government railways. In 1908, McEwan Pratt were producing the "Dando-Murray" paraffin locomotive, which was sold by London agents Duke & Ockenden. This arrangement was short-lived, though McEwan Pratt continued to use the "Murray" name for their products.

=== Financial struggles ===
The company produced a wide range of locomotives but struggled financially. In 1909, they were forced to mortgage their works at Wickford. Matters deteriorated in the next few years, and the company went into liquidation in March 1912.

=== McEwan Pratt (1912) ===
McEwan Pratt Ltd were wound up in March 1912, Baguley Cars Ltd approached the liquidator and purchased the Wickford works, stock, order book and patents. Baguley set up a new subsidiary called McEwan Pratt (1912) Ltd. which resumed production at the Wickford works to fulfil the remaining orders. Leonard Bentall, the McEwan Pratt draughtsman, became the chief draughtsman of Baguley and led the design of future Baguley and McEwan Pratt designs, which shared many common features. Robert McEwan also joined Baguley where he worked until 1921. He then left to form Light Railways Ltd which operated until 1929, and was an agent for Baguley locomotives.

=== First World War ===
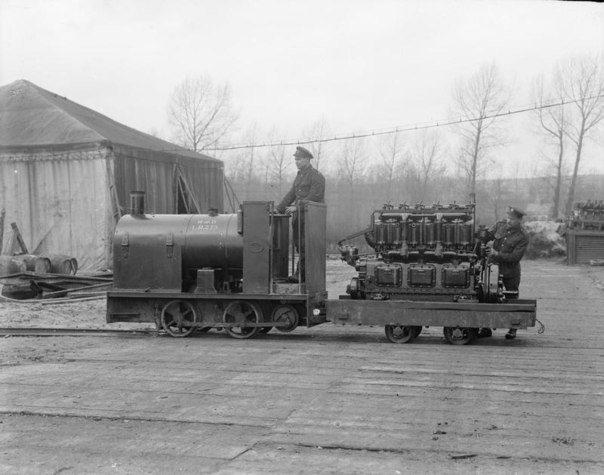
10hp Baguley "rail tractor"

During the First World War, the War Department (WD) was responsible for transport services to support the British troops. They made extensive use of railways to supply the trenches and used 2 ft (610 mm) gauge railways to move munitions, food and other goods from supply depots to the front lines. In 1915, the WD put out a tender for the supply of lightweight "rail tractors" to operate these lines. Leonard Benhall designed a 10hp 0-4-0PM locomotive based on a 1914 design supplied to a mine in Japan. The new locomotive was water-cooled and had a large tank to carry the water. More than 50 locomotives of this new design were supplied to military railways during the conflict, though they were only a limited success, being too light for many duties. These locomotives were sold under the Baguley name.

=== 1920s ===
Baguley continued to use the McEwan Pratt name into the 1920s.

== Production ==
No locomotives built by McEwan Pratt at their Wickford works are known to have survived, though several early Baguley locomotives built to McEwan Pratt designs do. The following classes were produced at Wickford:

Class	Power	Gauge	Type	Produced	Notes
Type C	10-20hp	2 ft (610 mm) - 2 ft 6 in (762 mm)	4wPM	1907-1909	Advertised as "Dando-Murray tractors"
Unknown	50hp	1,000 mm (3 ft 3 3/8 in)	0-6-0PM	August 1909	Supplied to the Assam Oil Company
Type E	40hp	2 ft 6 in (762 mm)	0-6-0PM	1911-1912	May also have been produced in a 60hp version, the Type N
Type G	24hp	2 ft 6 in (762 mm)	0-4-0PM	1910-1911	Supplied to the Ferrocarril Barrancas-y-Resbalon in Chile
Type J	40hp	20 in (508 mm)	4wPM	1911	Supplied to the Royal Arsenal Railway, Woolwich
Type K	24hp	2 ft 6 in (762 mm)	4-2w-4PM	1910	One-off, self-contained hunting coach made for the Rao of Cutch.
Type P	80/100hp	2 ft 6 in (762 mm)	0-6-0PM	1911	One supplied to the Chattenden and Upnor Railway
Type T	60hp	3 ft (914 mm)-3 ft 6 in (1,067 mm)	2w-2PM	1911-1912	Railcar
Unknown	10hp	Unknown	0-4-0PM	1912	
Type U	10hp	3 ft 6 in (1,067 mm)	4wPM	1912	Railvan supplied to the BKR, Nigeria
