= Page's Park railway station =

Railway station in Leighton Buzzard, England

Coordinates: 51°54′31″N 0°39′02″W

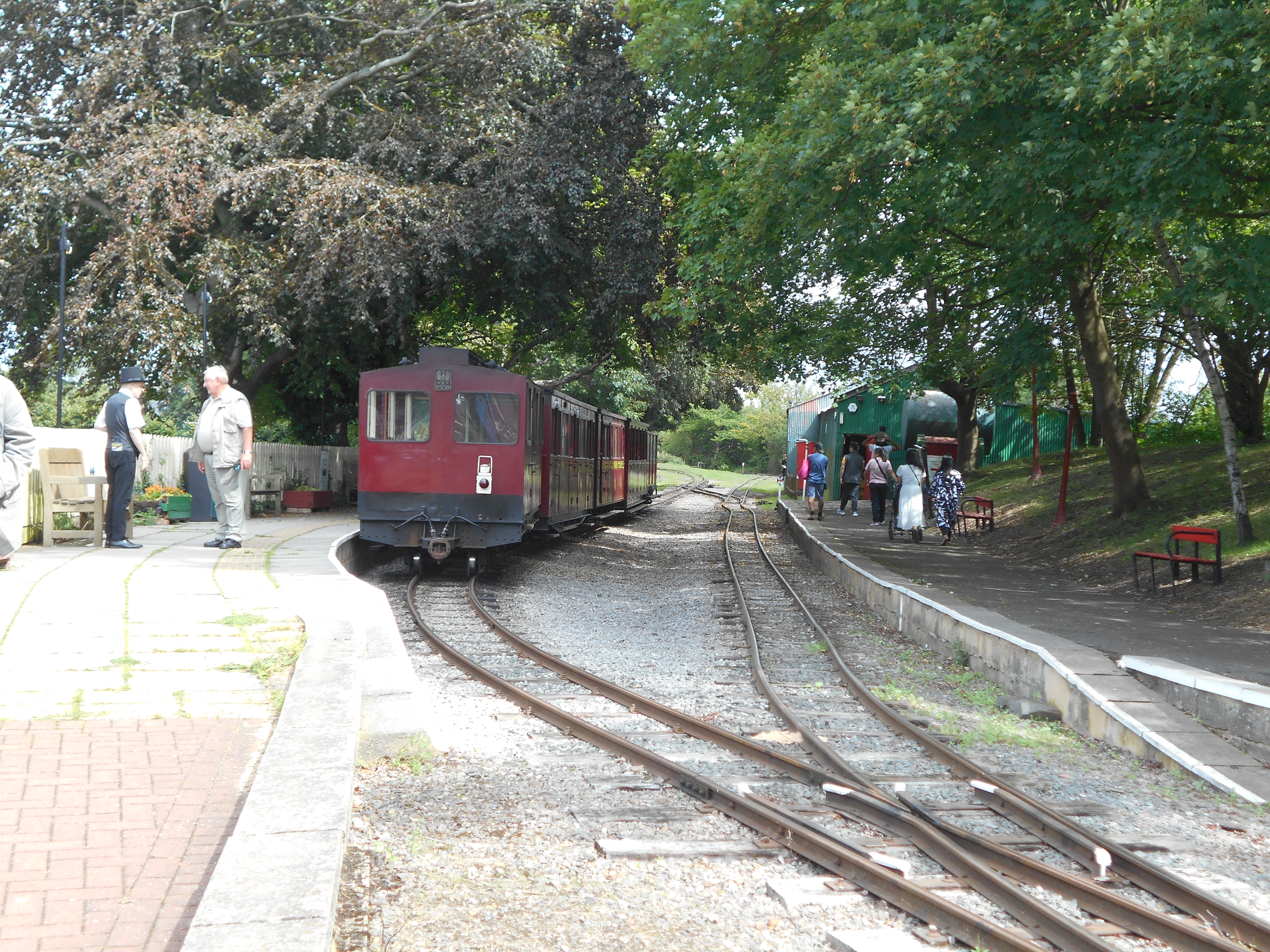
Page's Park station platforms

Page's Park railway station is a railway station serving the southern area of Leighton Buzzard. Page's Park is the terminus of the heritage Leighton Buzzard Narrow Gauge Railway. At present the station consists of two platforms, an engine shed and a station building housing the booking office, shop and community room.

The locomotive shed can be viewed by the public on certain days and a footpath leads from the platform to the yard so the public can view locos being prepared.

Preceding station	Heritage railways	Following station
Terminus	Leighton Buzzard Railway	Stonehenge Works
