= Chaloner (locomotive) =

Preserved narrow-gauge steam locomotive

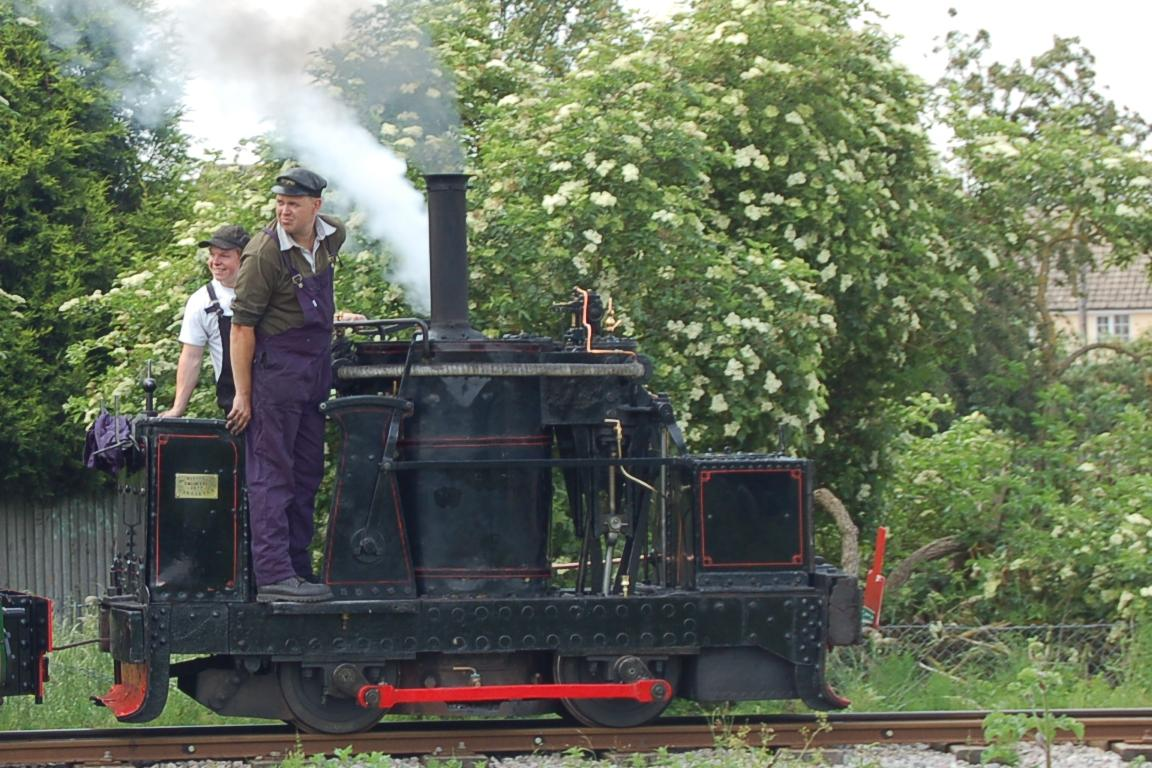
Chaloner at the LBNGR

Chaloner is a preserved narrow-gauge steam locomotive. It was built in 1877 at De Winton's Union Works in Caernarfon and is an example of their distinctive vertical-boilered design, used in the North Wales slate industry.

== Industrial use ==
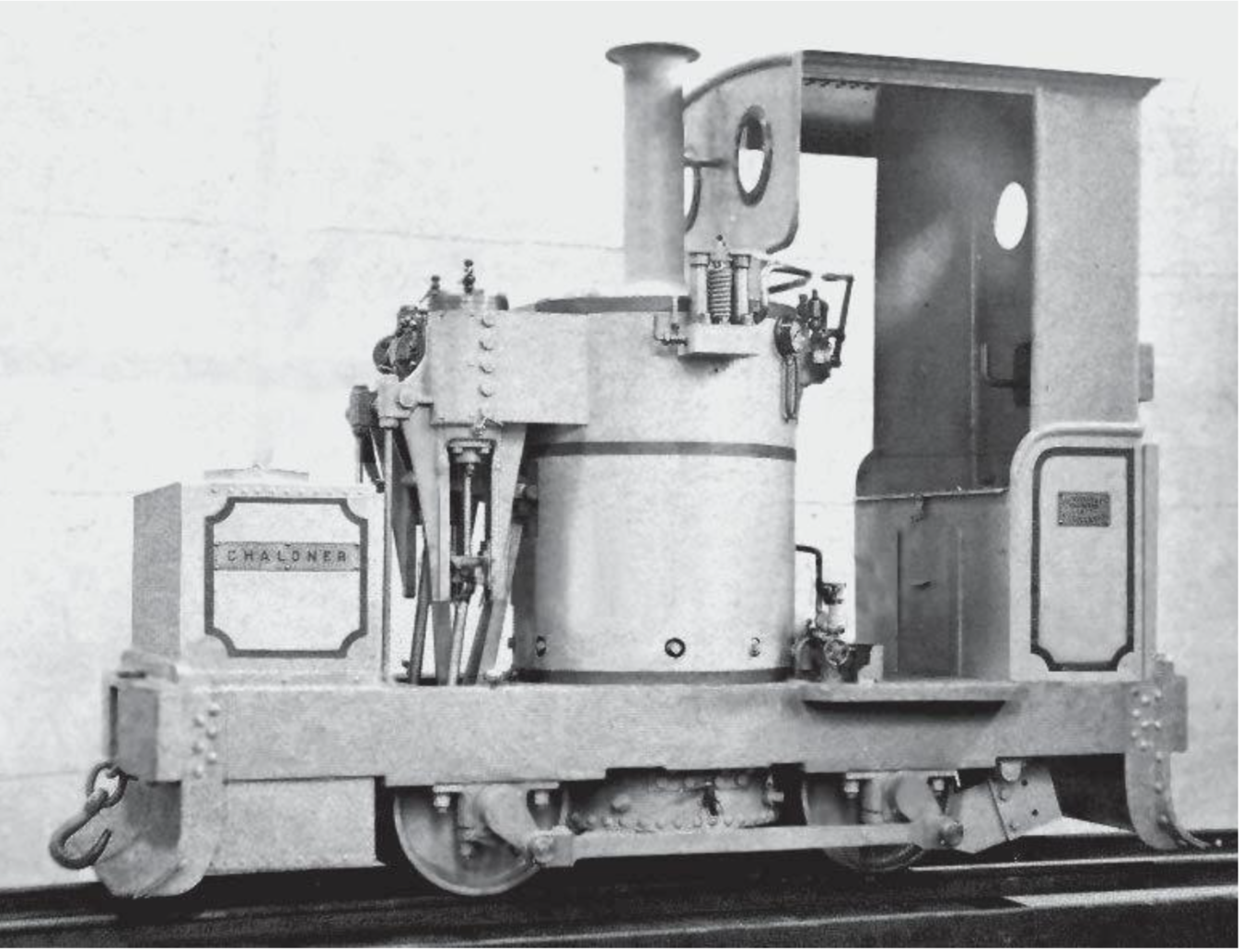
Works photograph of Chaloner, as supplied with cab to Pen-y-Bryn slate quarry, Nantlle

Chaloner was supplied new to the Pen-y-Bryn slate quarry, Nantlle. Unusually for a de Winton locomotive, it was supplied with an overall cab.

In 1888, it was sold to the nearby Pen-yr-Orsedd Quarry. Pen-yr-orsedd leased the Penybryn tipping tramway in 1890, so for a while Chaloner may have continued to run on its original line. It was withdrawn from service at Pen-yr-orsedd around 1950, and stored in a locomotive shed at the quarry with Kerr Stuart locomotive Diana.

== Preservation ==
In 1960, Chaloner was purchased by Alfred Fisher, who restored it to working order.

=== Leighton Buzzard Light Railway ===
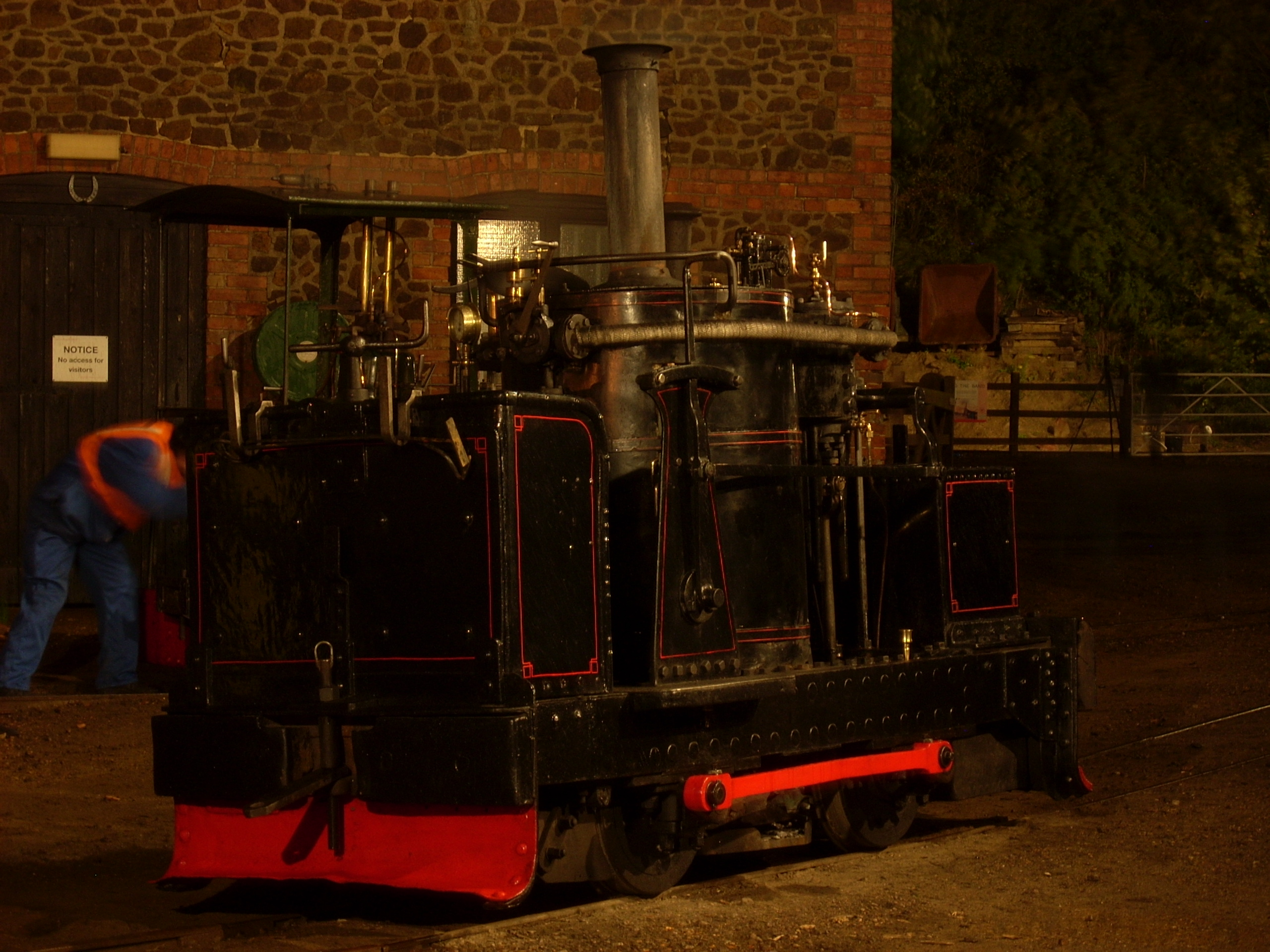
Chaloner at the Leighton Buzzard "steam glow" event in 2008

The locomotive was used to haul the opening train of the 'Iron Horse Railroad' at Leighton Buzzard in 1968. The railway later became the Leighton Buzzard Light Railway. Though in poor condition it hauled trains there for several years, until replaced by more powerful locomotives needed for longer trains. It was housed at the National Railway Museum in York from 1977 until 1983.

Chaloner has received a new boiler fitted at Boston Lodge Works but apart from that is composed of entirely original material, making it unique among mid-Victorian locomotives. The newest part is the water tank which originated on a locomotive called 'Victoria' and dates from 1897. It has been successively improved since preservation. In 2011 it worked a train of two slate wagons and members from Caernarfon (opposite the works where it was built) to Porthmadog on the Welsh Highland Railway a distance of twenty five miles achieving speeds over well over 20 mph on the flat. A week later it worked to Blaenau Ffestiniog and back with slate wagons. Correcting the valves' size and other adjustments since then have seen further improvements to performance affecting economy.

During its display in the old de Winton works in Caernarfon a works photograph was discovered showing the engine as-built with its cab. A replica cab was built and fitted, but it made operating conditions difficult and it was removed and placed in store after two years.

Chaloner remains based at Leighton Buzzard.

=== Visiting other railways ===
Chaloner was a visitor to the Ffestiniog Railway for the 150th Anniversary Celebrations in 1986. It returned in October 1986 for an overhaul at Boston Lodge, including fitting of a new boiler. Another of a number of visits was the Festival of Steam Gala, May 1997.

It visited the Welsh Highland Heritage Railway around 1989 and 1998, and in 2006 visited the Welsh Highland Railway (Caernarfon). Other visits were made in 2011 and 2019. It visited the Bala Lake Railway for its 2025 Steam Gala. It has visited 24 other railways, including some in France, Germany and Belgium.
