= Leighton Buzzard Light Railway =

Preserved narrow gauge railway in Bedfordshire

Coordinates: 51°54′31″N 0°39′6.32″W

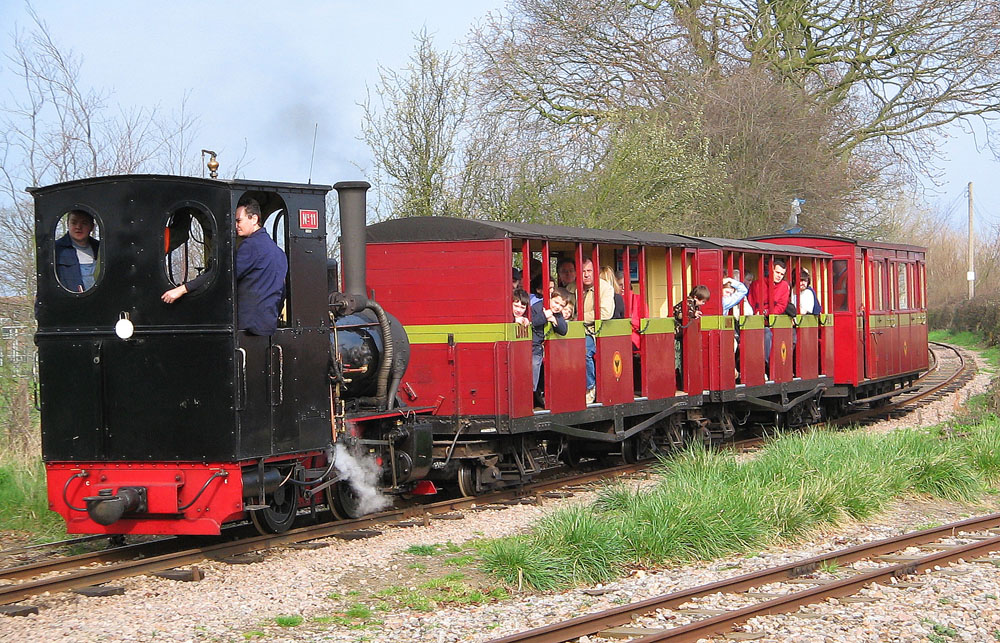
- A train on the LBLR being pulled by No. 11 PC Allen
- Locale: England
- Terminus: Page's Park, Leighton Buzzard

Commercial operations
- Name: Leighton Buzzard Light Railway
- Built by: A.J. Arnold and G. Garside
- Original gauge: 2 ft (610 mm)

Preserved operations
- Operated by: Leighton Buzzard Narrow Gauge Railway Society
- Stations: 2
- Length: 3 miles (4.8 km)
- Preserved gauge: 2 ft (610 mm)

Commercial history
- Opened: 1919
- Closed: 1969

Preservation history
- 1968: First passenger trains run by preservation society

The Leighton Buzzard Light Railway (LBLR) is a light railway in Leighton Buzzard in Bedfordshire, England. It operates on 2 ft (610 mm) narrow-gauge track and is just over 3 miles (4.8 km) long. The line was built after the First World War to serve sand quarries north of the town. In the late 1960s the quarries switched to road transport and the railway was taken over by volunteers, who now run the line as a heritage railway.

== History ==
=== Sand extraction ===
A bed of Lower Cretaceous sand across Bedfordshire has been quarried on a small scale for centuries. The most significant deposits occur around Leighton Buzzard. In the 19th century sand was carried by horse carts from quarries south of the town to be shipped on the Dunstable-Leighton Buzzard railway. The carts damaged roads and resulted in claims for compensation against the quarry owners from Bedfordshire County Council. At the end of the century steam wagons were introduced which increased the damage to roads.

The outbreak of the First World War cut off supplies of foundry sand from Belgium. Sand was needed for ammunition factories and new sources were sought. Leighton Buzzard sands proved well suited and production increased. After 1919 the quarry companies were told they could no longer transport sand by roads, so a private industrial railway was proposed to take the traffic.

=== Original railway ===
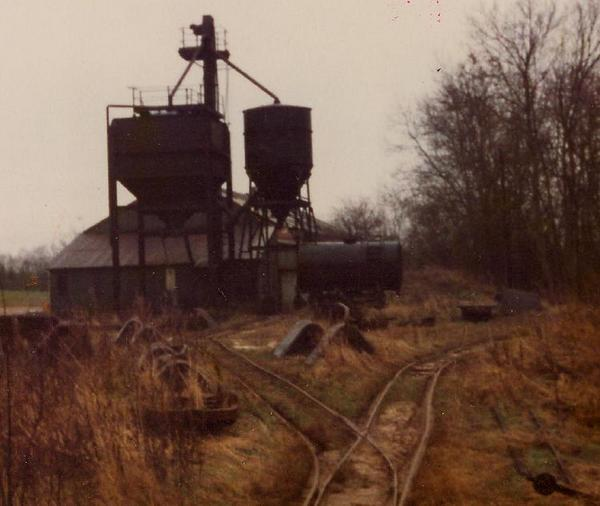
George Garside's quarry in 1980, just before industrial rail operations ended

Leighton Buzzard Light Railway opened on Thursday 20 November 1919, linking the sand quarries (Double Arches at the far end of the line) with the mainline railway south of the town at Grovebury sidings. The line was built using surplus equipment from the War Department Light Railways. The railway was built to a gauge of 2 ft (610 mm) and laid using mostly 30 lb/yd (14.9 kg/m) rail. The line opened using steam traction by two Hudswell Clarke 0-6-0 side tank steam locomotives. These proved inappropriate for the tightly-curved line and the steam locomotives were sold in 1921. From that point the railway was run using internal combustion, almost exclusively the products of the Motor Rail company made in nearby Bedford. It was one of the first railways in Britain entirely operated by internal combustion.

After the Second World War sand traffic returned to the roads. In 1953 a strike on mainline railways pushed more traffic onto the roads. By the mid-1960s only one sand quarry, Arnold's, still used the light railway. The BR line to Dunstable was closed in 1965, apart from a short stretch from Leighton Buzzard to Grovebury interchange sidings, which survived until 1969.

=== Preservation ===
In November 1966 "The Iron Horse Railway Preservation Society" was formed with the objective of running passenger services on the line. They ran their first excursion on 3 March 1966, using two Simplex locomotives at each end of a train of three bogie wagons borrowed from the railway. By 1968 the line was more lightly used and the Iron Horse Society began regular passenger services on the line. Part of the agreement between the railway and the volunteers was that volunteers would repair the permanent way. This was undertaken, the group having purchased secondhand rolling stock and four Simplex diesels from the St Albans Sand and Gravel company, which were dismantled and formed into one machine. The last sand train ran on the main line in 1969, although several quarries continued to use the lines within their quarries. These were eventually replaced by roads and conveyor belts and the last internal quarry line was abandoned in 1981. Today the line is run purely as a heritage railway.

A large collection of steam and internal combustion locomotives run on the line. Visitors can ride the train and can be issued with an Edmondson ticket. There is a collection of industrial railway locomotives at Stonehenge Works towards the northern end of the line.

The railway is promoted by the Campaign to Protect Rural England. On 22 June 2013, John Travolta visited the railway with his son Benjamin.

== Route ==
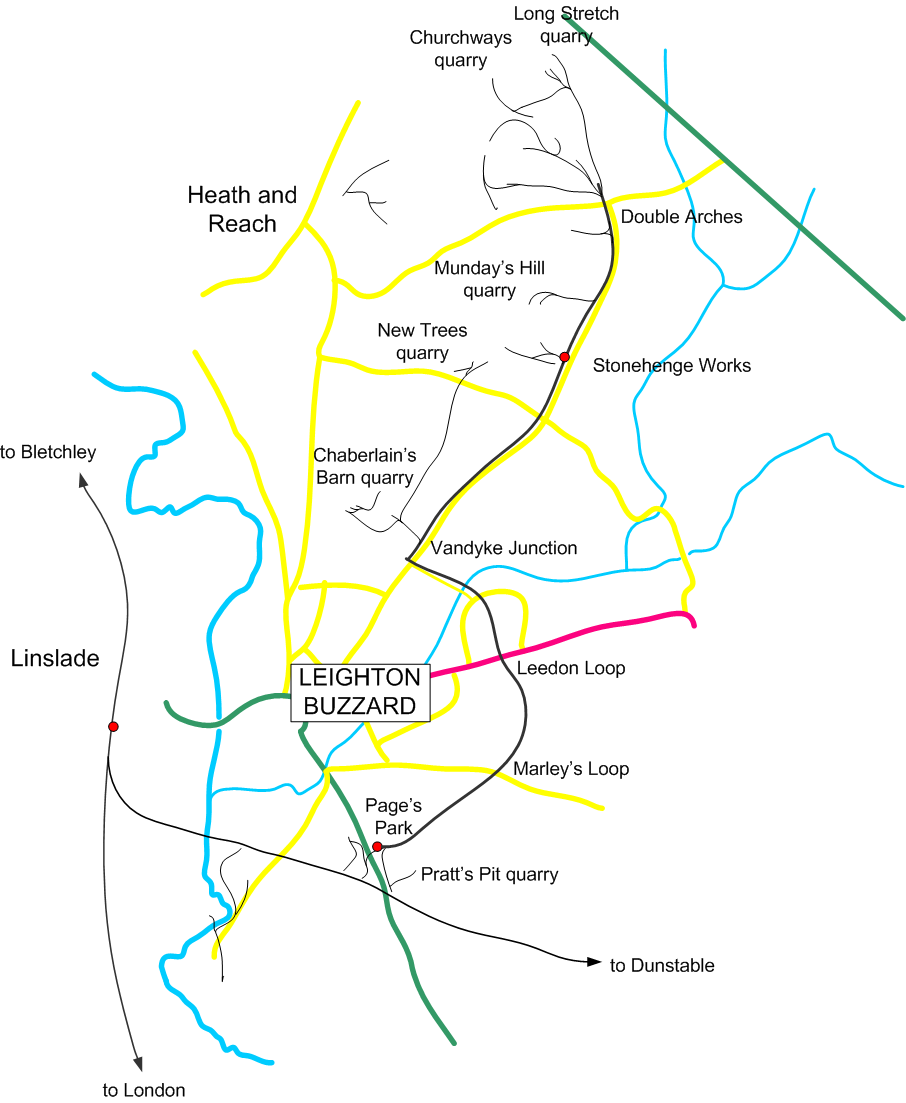
Map of the Leighton Buzzard Light Railway

The line is unusual as it runs mostly through modern housing built since the 1970s, although the last half mile runs through countryside. There are open level crossings for which trains stop.

The railway began at Grovebury Sidings, where sand trains unloaded into washers and the sand was shipped to standard-gauge trains on the Dunstable branch or to road. The sidings and industrial plant at Grovebury were replaced with an industrial estate in the early 1970s.

Trains from Grovebury crossed Billington Road by a level crossing and worked up a steep grade to Page's Park. Here a branch line south connected to the line's main engineering workshop and the Pratt's Pit quarry. In preservation, Page's Park forms the southern terminus of the heritage railway.

From Page's Park the line curves north towards a summit at The Vyne (known locally as 'Red Barn' - the site formerly having a red barn upon it). From there it descends at 1 in 60 (1.7%) before climbing again to cross Stanbridge Road very near the former site of RAF Stanbridge. On the left is the site of Marley's Tile Works, now a housing estate, which was connected to the railway for most of its existence. The line descends Marley's Bank at a maximum of 1 in 25 (4%). Loaded sand trains to Grovebury Sidings often needed a banking locomotive.

At the bottom of Marley's Bank the line turns sharply north and runs along the level to Leedon Loop where trains can pass, utilising the Absolute Block system. The line here passes through housing. After Leedon, the railway crosses Hockliffe Road, through the Planets estate, crosses the Clipstone Brook and begins to climb again on a 1 in 50 (2%) gradient to cross Vandyke Road.

Immediately after crossing Vandyke Road the line curves 90 degrees to Vandyke Junction where there was a passing loop. Here the branch line from Chamberlain's Barn and New Trees quarries joined the main line. A very short section of this branch remains intact, albeit disconnected from the line, so heritage trains do not use it. The railway then runs parallel to Vandyke Road, climbing steadily towards the former site of Bryan's Loop before descending under a newly-built (2023) road bridge providing access to the Chamberlain's Bridge housing estate, climbing away from that to rejoin the original track bed, then descending again to cross the Shenley Hill Road. The line levels and continues to Stonehenge Works, now one of the engineering workshops of the preserved railway. This is also the northern terminus of modern operations.

From Stonehenge the line continues northwards with approximately .75 miles (1.21 km) of double track, climbing towards the two Double Arches sand quarries, owned by Joseph Arnold and George Garside. The heritage railway currently terminates at Munday's Hill, where a run round loop has been laid and, during normal service operations, the train returns to the Stonehenge Works terminus for a layover before travelling back to Page's Park. Future plans include relaying the track as far as Eastern Way, preserving the line as closely as possible to its original formation, as is the principal aim of the charitable society.

The extension to Munday's Hill opened in 2023, having had its track relaid with help from apprentices from the Crossrail project. Some of the timber from the trees felled on the extension was repurposed by the railway to build the interior of their then-new coach, number 14.

== Preserved locomotives ==
These are the locomotives on the preserved railway. All are 2 ft (610 mm) gauge nominally, except where noted.

=== Steam ===
No.	Name	Wheel Type	Builder	Works No.	Year built	Origin	Livery	Notes	Image
1	Chaloner	0-4-0VBT	De Winton	n/a	1877	Penyrorsedd slate quarry, north Wales	Lined black	Worked at the Penybryn quarry until 1881, then Penyrorsedd until 1960. Purchased by Alfred Fisher and transferred to Leighton Buzzard in 1968. Too small for regular use but used on gala days. Major overhaul including a new boiler completed and operational as of 2024.	
2	Pixie	0-4-0ST	Kerr Stuart	4260	1922	Devon County Council, Wilminstone Quarry	Lined green	One of 27 of the Wren class ordered for a sewer contract in Essex, sold to Devon County Council in 1929. Purchased by the Industrial Locomotive Society in 1957; entered service at Leighton Buzzard in 1969. Has previously been on loan at the Devon Railway Centre and has now returned to LBNGR. Can be seen running on gala days but as of 2017 is currently undergoing overhaul.	
3	Rishra	0-4-0T	Baguley cars Ltd.	2007	1921	Hoogly Docking & Engineering Co., Rishra, India	Lined green	The only remaining locomotive of this type. Spent all of its working life in Calcutta, where it shunted coal wagons at a water pumping station. Purchased by Mike Satow in 1963 and repatriated to Leighton Buzzard. Entered service in 1971. Too small for regular use and only used on gala days. Awaiting overhaul as of 2019.	
4	Doll	0-6-0T	Andrew Barclay	1641	1919	Sydenham Ironstone Quarry, King's Sutton, Oxfordshire	Lined blue	Transferred in 1926 to Bilston Furnaces, where it ran until 1960. Purchased by the Bressingham Steam Museum in 1966; sold to Henry Williams in 1969; purchased by Leighton Buzzard Light Railway in 1972. A major overhaul involving the construction of a new boiler was completed in 2004 and the locomotive was used regularly on passenger trains. Returned to service in 2017 after a ten-yearly overhaul.	
5	Elf	0-6-0WT	Orenstein & Koppel	12740	1936	Likomba Development Company, Cameroon, Africa	Lined umber	Purchased in 1973 after serving on plantation railways in Cameroon until 1971. Wood-burning with a spark arrestor. Now converted to coal. Off site for overhaul as of 2025, expected to return to traffic late 2026.	
11	PC Allen	0-4-0WT	Orenstein & Koppel	5834	1913	Solvay Alkali Works, Torrelavega, Spain	Unlined green and black	Was originally built for the internal railway system at the chemical works of Solvay & Cie, Torrelavega, Spain. Purchased by Sir Peter Allen in 1963, transferred to Leighton Buzzard in 1970. Returned to service in 2014 following a major overhaul but now withdrawn requiring boiler repairs.	
9	Peter Pan	0-4-0ST	Kerr Stuart	4256	1922	Devon County Council, Willminstone Quarry, Devon	Unlined green	Wren class locomotive that worked with Pixie in Devon. Purchased in 1972 by Graham Hall who found the locomotive in a garden in Bromsgrove. Now owned by Graham Morris. Operational.	
778		4-6-0PT	Baldwin Locomotive Works	44656	1917	War Department Light Railways	Unlined black	Baldwin Class 10-12-D. One of 495 locomotives built by Baldwin in 1917, for the UK War Department Light Railways. They operated on the thousands of miles of narrow-gauge tracks that supplied the front line trenches in the First World War. It then worked in India until the 1980s, finishing at the Upper India Sugar Mills in Uttar Pradesh. Entered service in August 2007 and is regularly used on passenger trains. The completion of the restoration made 778 the first locomotive of this type to operate in Britain since 1950.	
4	Sezela	0-4-0T	Avonside Engine Company	1738	1915	Sezela sugar-cane plantation, Natal, South Africa	Unlined green	Built for the 125 mile line that served the Sezela sugar-cane plantation in Natal, South Africa. Returned to service after overhaul in 2019. Awaiting remedial boiler work as of 2025.	
	Gertrude	0-6-0T	Andrew Barclay	1578	1918	Sydenham Ironstone Quarry, King's Sutton, Oxfordshire	Lined red	Transferred in 1926 to Bilston Furnaces where it ran until 1960 with classmate Doll. It steamed for the first time in preservation at the Welsh Highland Heritage Railway in 2010. She remained there until 2019 where she moved to the Leighton Buzzard Railway. Operational as of 2024.	
2023		0-8-0T	Krauss	7455	1918	First World War service in the German Army	Unlined grey	One of 2500 of this design to be built to serve the German Army in World War I. Following the war it was used on the sugar-beet railway at Maizy in northern France. Finally, it moved to a sand quarry in Variscourt in 1964 before being acquired for preservation in 1970. Acquired by the Leighton Buzzard Railway in 2014 and is awaiting restoration to full working order.	
	Pedemoura	0-6-0WT	Orenstein & Koppel	10808	1922	Douro Valley coal mines, northern Portugal	Lined green	Is one size larger than Elf and is a powerful locomotive. After operating for the Douro Valley coal mines in northern Portugal, it was shipped over to the UK in the 1970s for preservation. Following an extensive restoration, the locomotive re-entered service for the first time in over 50 years in July 2016. Off site for overhaul as of 2025.	
	Nutty	4wVBT	Sentinel Waggon Works	7701	1929	Fletton Brickworks	Yellow	2 ft 6 in (762 mm). Previously on static display. Returned to Welshpool & Llanfair Light Railway in 2023.	
	Penlee	0-4-0WT	Freudenstein	73	1901		Red	Rebuilt by ARC c1983. Static display and made accessible for children to climb on the footplate.	
	Elidir	0-4-0T	Avonside	2071	1933				
		0-4-0WT	Orenstein & Koppel	2544	1907				

=== Internal combustion ===
No.	Name	Type	Builder	Works No.	Year built	Origin	Livery	Notes	Image
(1)		4wDM	Motor Rail	5612	1931	St Albans Sand and Gravel Co. Ltd. Nazeing, Essex		Dismantled by 1988. Restored and returned to service to celebrate the 100th anniversary in 2019.	
(2)		4wDM	Motor Rail	5608	1931	St Albans Sand and Gravel Co. Ltd. Smallford, Hertfordshire		Converted to a brakevan, c. 1970	
(3)		4wDM	Motor Rail	5613	1931	St Albans Sand and Gravel Co. Ltd. Smallford, Hertfordshire		Converted to a crane, c. 1970	
7	Falcon (Pam until c. 1978)	4wDM	Orenstein & Koppel	8986	unknown	Woodham Brick Co. Ltd., Wotton, Buckinghamshire	Blue	Only surviving member of the MD2 class in Britain. Rescued from a Newport Pagnell scrapyard in 1970 by Peter Hodges.	
8	Gollum	4wDM	Ruston Hornsby	217999	1942	Featherby's Brickworks, Rochford, Essex			
9	Madge	4wDM	Orenstein & Koppel	7600	1935	Oxstead Grestone Lime Co. Ltd., Oxstead, Surrey		Single cylinder RL1C class	
10	Haydn Taylor	4wDM	Motor Rail	7956	1945	British Industrial Sand Ltd. Middelton Towers, Norfolk		Originally loaned by its owners in 1971. Nicknamed "Breadbin" due to its unusual cab shape. Rebuilt in 1973 with a conventional cab. "Breadbin"-style cab reapplied in preservation.	
12	Carbon	4wPM	Motor Rail	6012	1930	Standard Bottle Co., New Southgate, Middlesex		Arrived in 1972 via M.E. Engineering, Cricklewood.	
13	Arkle	4wDM	Motor Rail	7108	1937	George Garside, Leighton Buzzard, Bedfordshire		Original Leighton Buzzard sand quarry loco, operated until 1981	
(14)		4wDM	Hunslet	3646	1946	Crumbles Gravel Pits, Eastbourne, Sussex		Arrived 1972	
15	Tom Bombadil (after 1990)	4wDM	F.C. Hibberd	2415	1941	Butterley & Blaby Brick Companies Ltd., Ripley, Derbyshire			
16	Thorin Oakenshield	4wPM	Lister	11221	1939	Guard Bridge Paper Co. Ltd., Leuchars, Fife			
17	Damredub	4wPM	Motor Rail	7036	1936	George Garside, Leighton Buzzard, Bedfordshire		Original Leighton Buzzard sand quarry loco, operated until 1981	
18	Fëanor	4wDM	Motor Rail	11003	1956	British Industrial Sands Ltd., Middleton Towers, Norfolk	Dark Maroon		
19		4wDM	Motor Rail	11298	1965	British Industrial Sands Ltd., Middleton Towers, Norfolk			
20		4wDM	Motor Rail	60S317	1966	British Industrial Sands Ltd., Middleton Towers, Norfolk			
21	Festoon	4wPM	Motor Rail	4570	1929	George Garside, Leighton Buzzard, Bedfordshire		Original Leighton Buzzard sand quarry loco, preserved 1981	
22	Fingolfin	4wDM	LBLR	1	1989	Constructed from parts of Ruston Hornsby 425798 and 444207			
23		4wDM	Ruston Hornsby	164346	1932	West Kent Main Sewage Board, Littlebrook, Kent		Second oldest Ruston Hornsby locomotive in existence	
24		4wDM	Motor Rail	11297	1965	British Industrial Sands Ltd., Middleton Towers, Norfolk			
30		4wDM	Motor Rail			Green			
34	RED RUM	4wDM	Motor Rail	7105	1936		Green (new photo required)		
36	Caravan	4wDM	Motor Rail	7129	1938	Redland Flettons Brick Company	Yellow	An unusual variant of the Motor Rail Simplex class with an overall cab.	
(40)	TRENT	4wDM	Ruston & Hornsby	283507	1949		Blue		
43		4wDM	Motor Rail	10409	1954	Leighton Buzzard Light Railway Company, Leighton Buzzard, Bedfordshire		Original LBLR mainline locomotive; purchased by John Cohring in 1972, formally transferred to the railway's ownership by J Cohring in 2025. Unique in having never left the LBLR rails in its entire life except for two road transfers from one end to the other (and back) in the 1970s when the line was closed for maintenance.	
44		4wDM	Motor Rail					Sister engine to 43	
NG46		4wDH	Baguley-Drewry	3698	1973				
NG51 "River Sark"		4wDH	Barclay	720	1987	Eastriggs Munitions Factory, Dumfries-Shire, Scotland.		Arrived 2022. visited the FR for the 1995 Gala. Nameplates currently removed. Privately owned.	
80	Beaudesert	4wDH	Alan Keef	59R	1999 (current build)			Built to LBR specifications for passenger train and standby duties, “Beaudesert” used many parts from an earlier 900mm-gauge T-Series Simplex locomotive, supplied to the National Coal Board in 1979, and later used as a shunter on the Channel Tunnel construction project. It is powered by a 112 hp Dorman diesel engine. Named after a school in the old part of Leighton Buzzard, and the school which replaced it, near the railway, in the Planets Estate.	
81	PETER WOOD	4wDH	Hunslet	9347	1994			Former Jubilee Line extension locomotive.	

=== Electric ===
No.	Name	Type	Builder	Works No.	Year built	Origin	Livery	Notes	Image
NG23		4wBE	Baguley-Drewry	3702	1973			Rebuilt by Andrew Barclay 1987	

=== Previous running stock ===
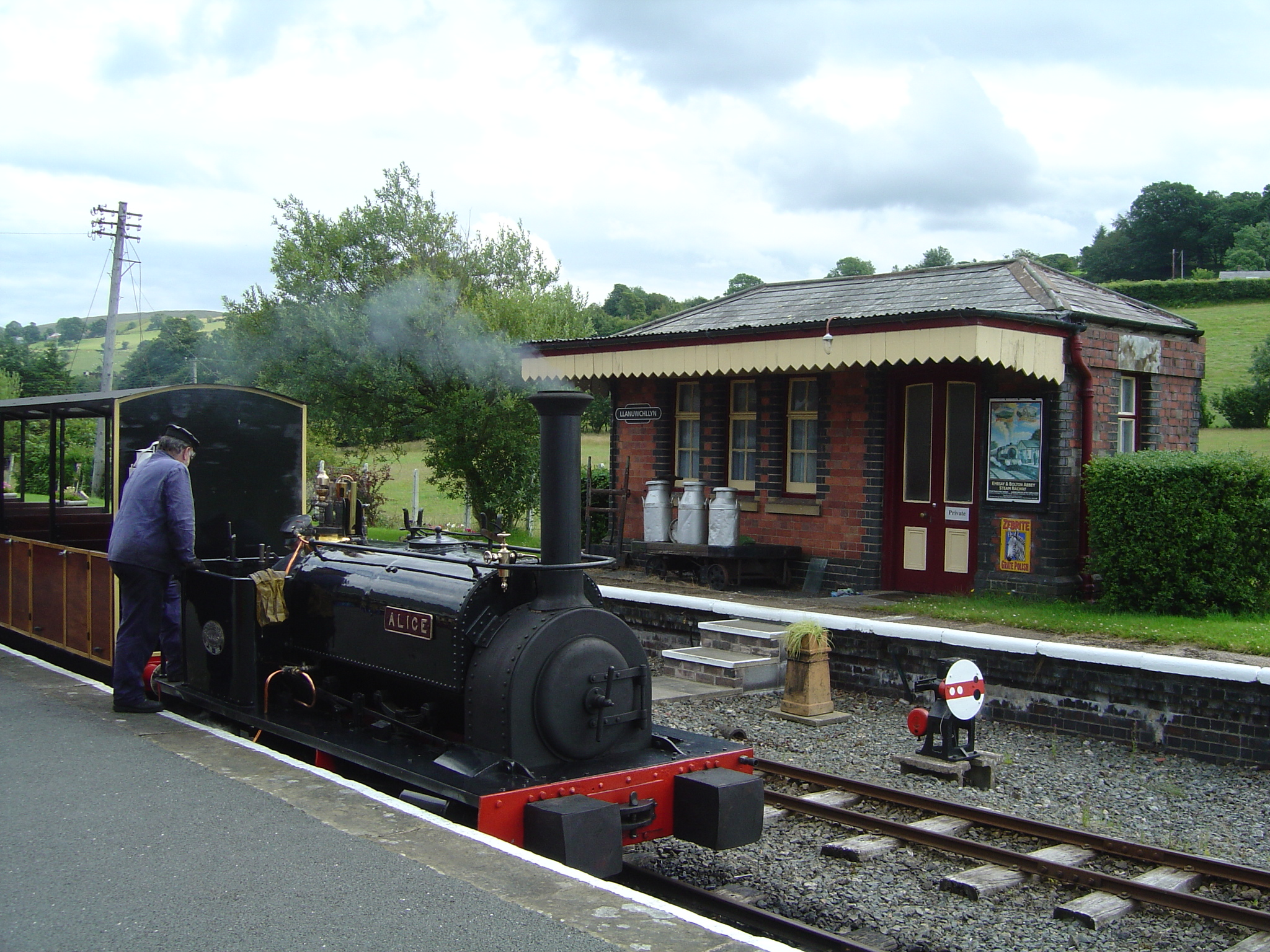
Alice at the Bala Lake Railway

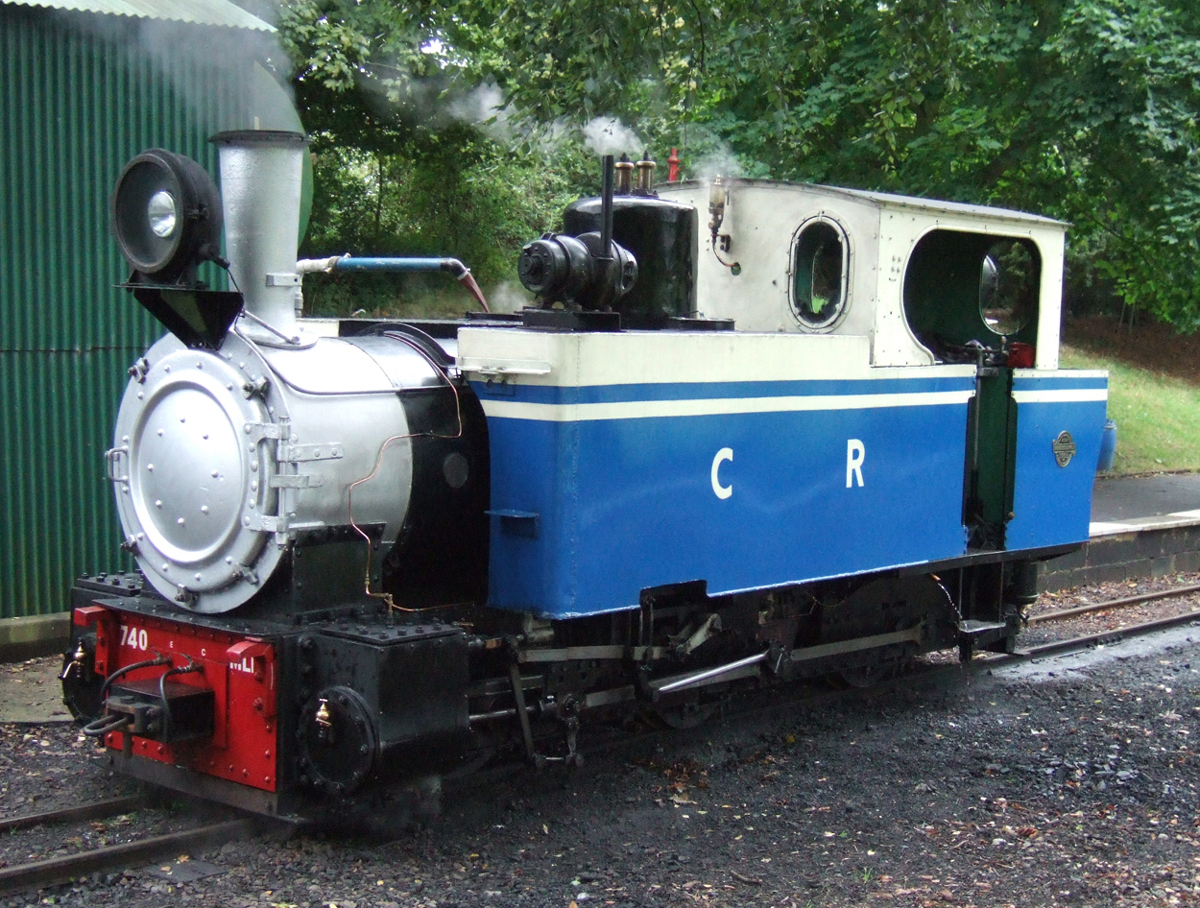
Locomotive No. 740 on shed at Pages Park

No.	Name	Wheel Type	Builder	Works No.	Year built	Origin	Notes
6	Alice	0-4-0ST	Hunslet	780	1902	Dinorwic slate quarry	Now running at the Bala Lake Railway
(24)		4wPM	Motor Rail	4805	1934	J. Arnold & Sons Ltd., Leighton Buzzard, Bedfordshire	Original Leighton Buzzard sand quarry loco, dismantled by 1980
740		0-6-0PT	Orenstein & Koppel	2343	1907	Matheran Light Railway, Maharashtra, India	Restored to working order, has rare Klein-Linder radial axles. She first worked at Leighton Buzzard on 7 September 2002.

=== Visiting locomotives ===
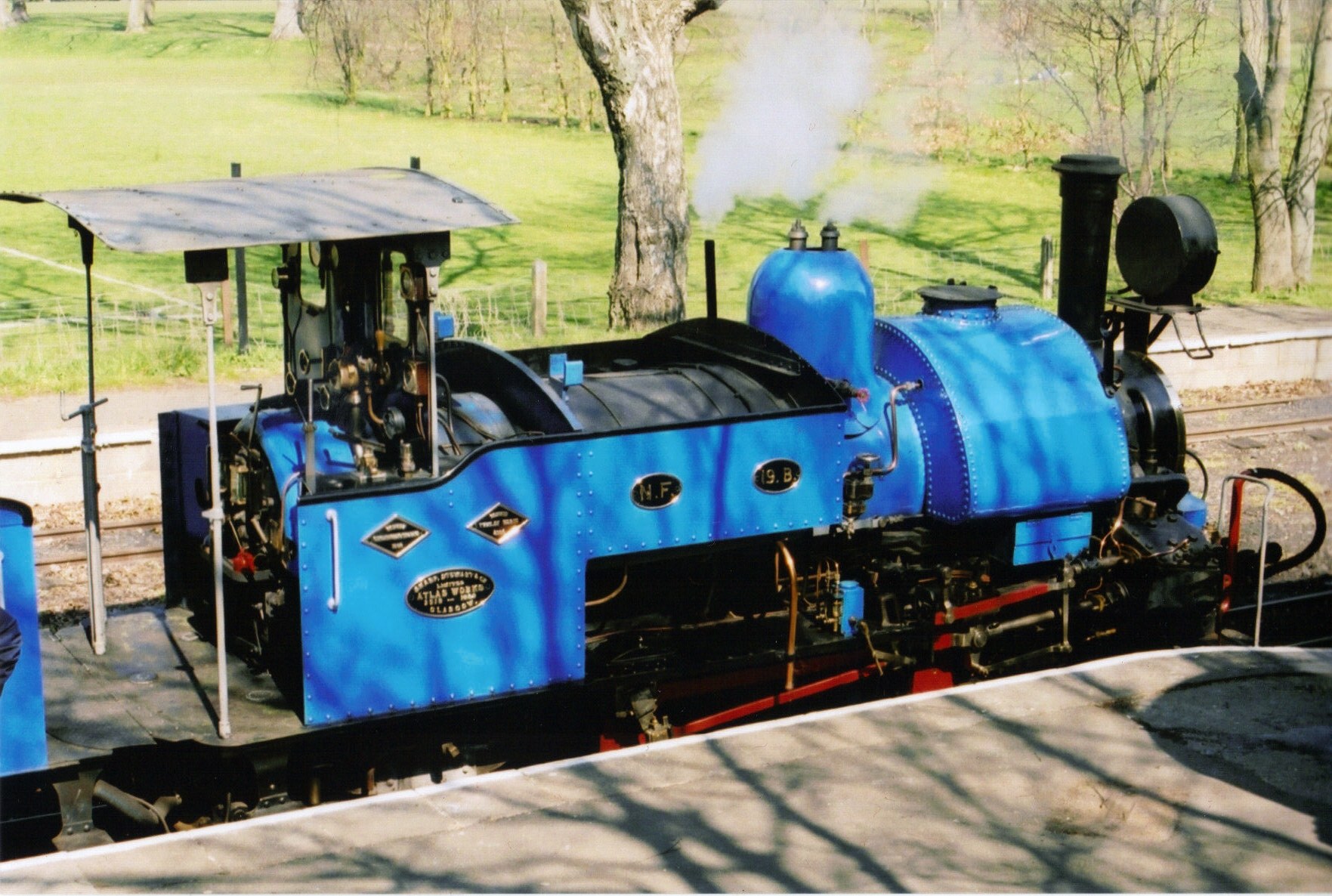
DHR19 in the station at Leighton Buzzard

Number	Name	Builder	Year Visited	Location	Notes
DHR19		Sharp Stewart		Beeches Light Railway	Works No. 3518, built for the Darjeeling Himalayan Railway, B Class No. 19 (778 under the all-India number scheme)
22	Montalban	Orenstein & Koppel		West Lancashire Light Railway	
	Woto	WG Bagnall		Alan Keef Ltd	
	Elidir	Hunslet	September 1991	Llanberis Lake Railway	
	Britomart	Hunslet		Ffestiniog Railway	
	Jack			West Lancashire Light Railway	
	Irish Mail	Hunslet		West Lancashire Light Railway	
	Barbouilleur	Decauville		Amberley Museum Railway	
1	Bronhilde	Berliner Maschinenbau (Schwartzkopff)		Bredgar and Wormshill Light Railway	Built in 1927
2	Katie	Arn Jung		Bredgar and Wormshill Light Railway	Built in 1931
10	Naklo	Fablok (Chrzanow)		South Tynedale Railway	Built 1957
	Triassic	Peckett		Bala Lake Railway	
	Alan George	Hunslet		Teifi Valley Railway	Works No. 606, built in 1894
4	Stanhope	Kerr Stuart	2001	West Lancashire Light Railway	Owned by the Moseley Railway Trust, Tattoo class 2395 built in 1917
939	Justine	Arn Jung	1986	North Gloucestershire Narrow Gauge Railway	
1091		Henschel	2009	North Gloucestershire Narrow Gauge Railway	
1652	Type 17	Decauville	2009	Froissy Dompierre Light Railway	

== See also ==
- British narrow-gauge railways
