= Bagnall–Price valve gear =

Type of valve gear

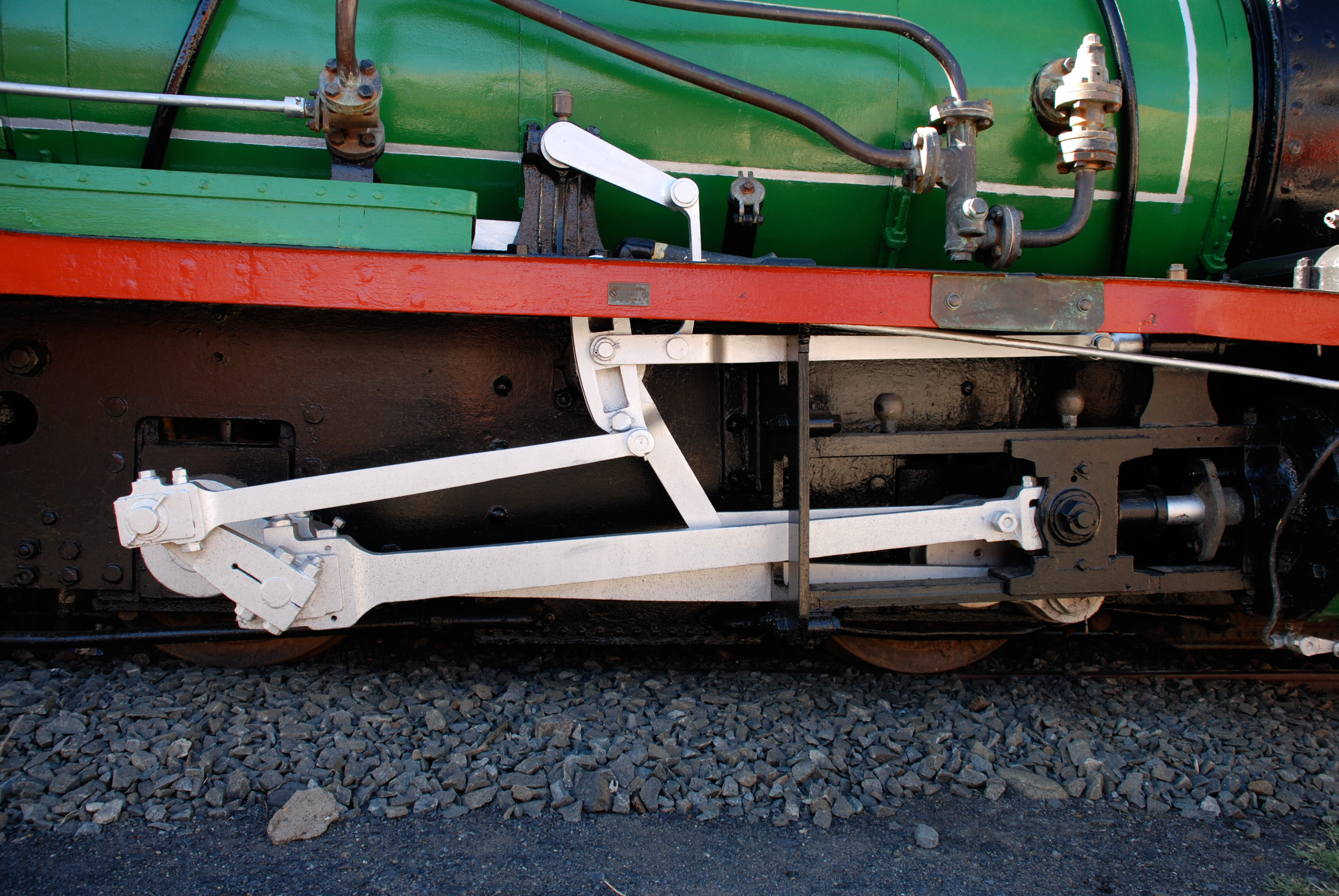
Bagnall–Price valve gear on an 18 in gauge Bagnall product at the Kimberley diamond mine museum, South Africa

Bagnall–Price valve gear is a type of steam engine valve gear developed at locomotive manufacturer W.G. Bagnall as an alternative to the more common Walschaerts valve gear and also to supersede the Baguley valve gear their designs had previously utilised. The gear was patented in 1903 by W.G. Bagnall and T. S. Price, the manager of the works.

== Layout ==
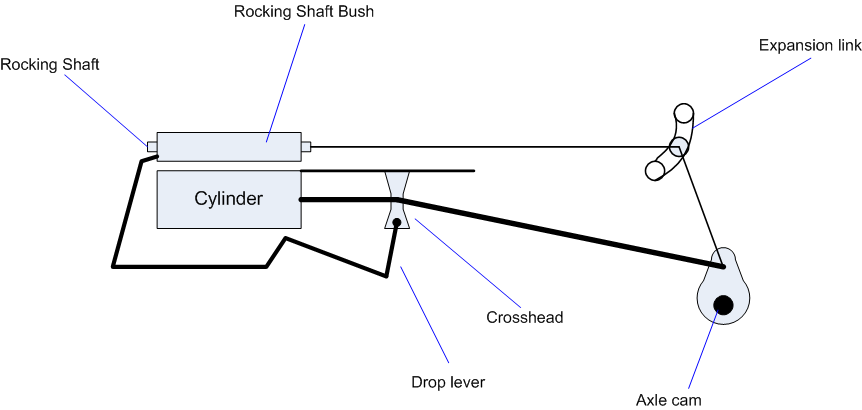
Schematic diagram showing the major components of the Bagnall–Price valve gear

The valves are driven from an eccentric cam mounted on one of the driving axles and linkage from the crosshead. The driving axle cam drives a rocking shaft that is mounted inside a cylindrical sleeve (known as the rocking shaft bush) above the cylinder. A drop lever and connecting link from the crosshead oscillates the sleeve to control the lap and lead of the cylinder.

=== Comparisons ===
Walschaerts

W.G. Bagnall claimed that Bagnall–Price valve gear eliminated some of the complexity of the Walschaerts gear, specifically the combination lever and return gear; this in turn meant the externally mounted gear had greater ground clearance which was an advantage in industrial locations where lineside obstructions could damage the gear of passing locomotives.

Baguley valve gear

According to Baker the Bagnall–Price valve gear had only one common feature with the preceding Baguley valve gear, namely that "the application of the lap and lead motion by oscillating the expansion link (or sector) bodily, and thus superimposing this motion on the. normal die block travel, the lead remaining constant in all positions of the gear."
