= Toddington Narrow Gauge Railway =

Heritage railway line in the UK

Coordinates: 51.989°N 1.929°W

North Gloucestershire Railway
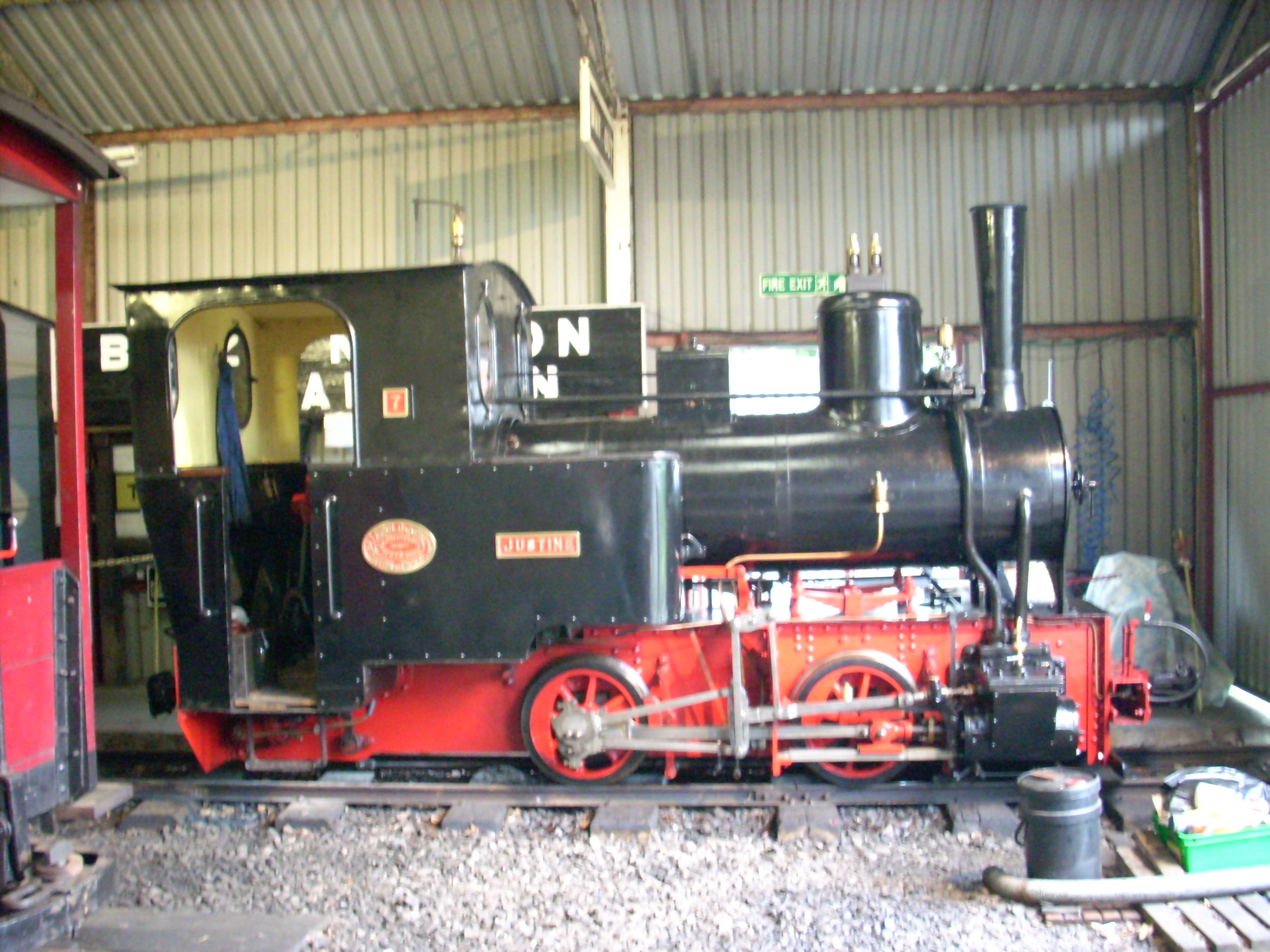
- Jung Locomotive Justine on shed
- Locale: England
- Terminus: Toddington

Commercial operations
- Name: North Gloucestershire Narrow Gauge Railway
- Original gauge: 2 ft (610 mm)

Preserved operations
- Stations: 2
- Length: 1/2 mile (0.80 km)
- Preserved gauge: 2 ft (610 mm)

The Toddington Narrow Gauge Railway (TNGR) is a 2 ft (610 mm) narrow-gauge railway running alongside the Gloucestershire and Warwickshire Railway at Toddington. It was built in 1985 when the Dowty Railway Preservation Society needed a new home for its collection of narrow-gauge rolling stock. The rail used on the railway was purchased from the Southend Pier Railway and Vale of Rheidol Railway.

The railway was originally named the North Gloucestershire Railway, but in 2018 is officially called the Toddington Narrow Gauge Railway.

== Locomotives ==
| Name | Builder | Type | Works number | Date built | Notes | Image |
|---|---|---|---|---|---|---|
| Chaka's Kraal No. 6 | Hunslet | 0-4-2T | 2075 | 1940 | Built to an Avonside design, and supplied new to Chaka's Kraal Sugar Estates, Natal. The locomotive was purchased in 1981 by the North Gloucestershire Railway. Following restoration at Ashchurch and Toddington it was based at the South Tynedale Railway until 1999 when it returned to Toddington. Major overhaul completed in 2015. 10 year boiler certificate has now expired and loco awaiting overhaul (2025) | |
| Justine | Jung | 0-4-0WT | 939 | 1906 | Operational, overhaul completed in 2020. Originally built for a Belgian gravel works. | |
| No. 1091 Brigadelok | Henschel | 0-8-0T | 15968 | 1918 | Overhaul. Boiler returned 31/1/24. Originally used by the German war time light railways supplying the trenches during WW1 | |
| Tourska | Fablok | 0-6-0T | | | Arrived Sept 2015. Overhaul. Boiler returned 31/1/24. | |
| | Hunslet | 4wDH | 6647 | 1967 | Operational. Ex MoD Singapore Naval Dockyard, later at Milford Haven. re-gauged from 2 ft 6in. | |
| | Ruston and Hornsby | 4wDM | 166010 | 1932 | Operational. Possibly oldest working Ruston & Hornsby loco. Re-gauged from 2 ft 6in. | |
| | Ruston and Hornsby | 4wDM | 354028 | 1953 | Operational. Originally Ilford Sewerage Works, then Gascoigne Wood Pumping Station in Barking, Essex | |
| | Lister | 4wDM | 34523 | 1940 | Operational | |
| | Motor Rail | 4wPM | 7053 | 1937 | Operational. Ex Gloucester Corporation | |
| Ivan | F. C. Hibberd & Co. | 4wPM | 3317 | 1948 | Operational. Ex Kempton Park Water Works | |
| Bryn Eglwys | Simplex Mechanical Handling Ltd | 4wDM | 101T023 | 1985 | This was originally a 2 ft 6 in (762 mm) gauge National Coal Board locomotive from Hem Heath colliery near Stoke-on-Trent. It was purchased by the Talyllyn Railway in September 1997 and re-gauged to 2 ft 3in, and was re-painted into standard Talyllyn livery during summer 2005. The locomotive was named after the Bryn Eglwys slate quarries. The loco was sold to the North Gloucestershire Railway, in August 2014 and re-gauged to 2 ft. | |

== See also ==
- British narrow-gauge railways
