= Ernest E. Baguley =

British engineer (1863–1948)

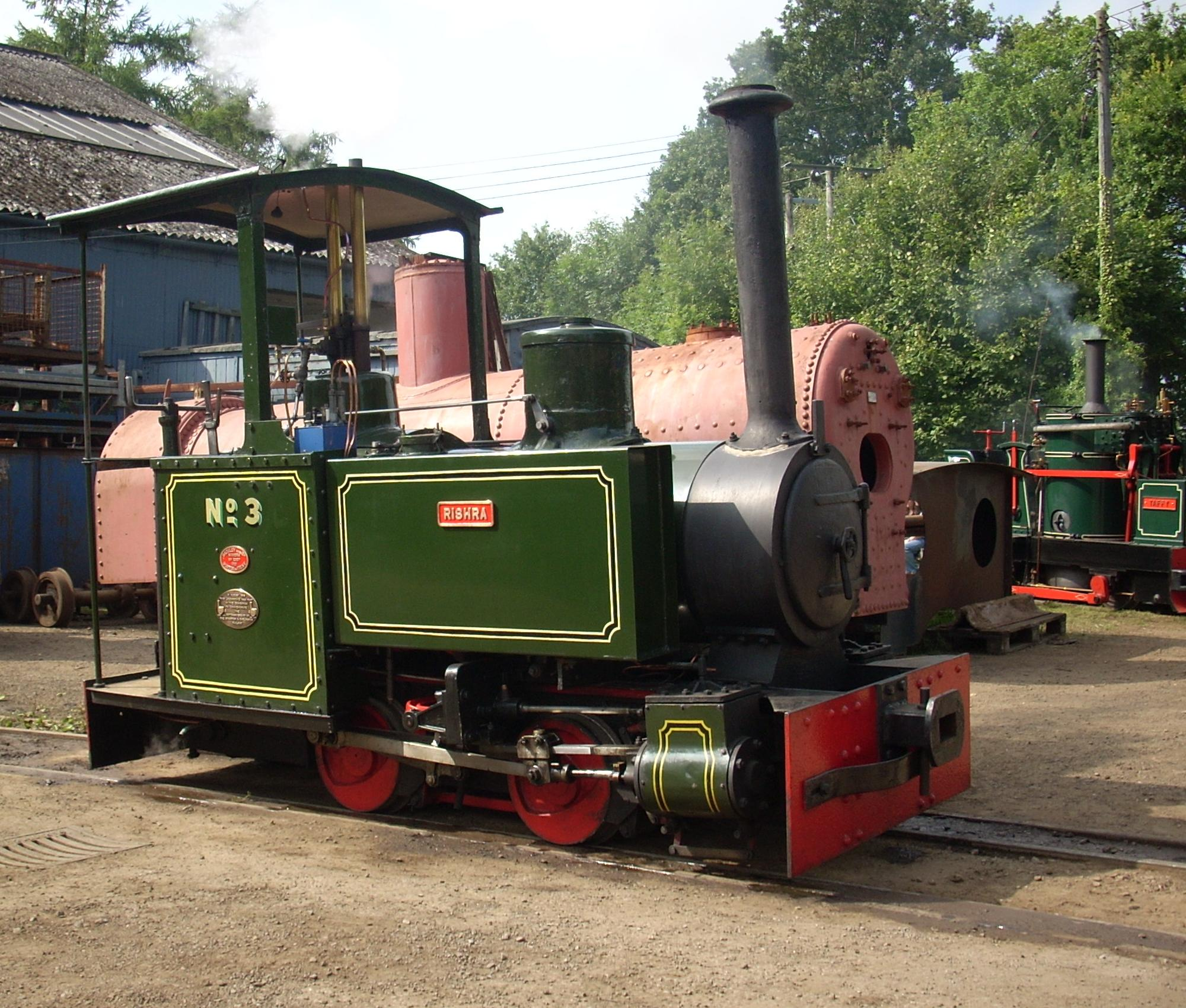
Baguley Cars Locomotive Rishra now resident at the Leighton Buzzard Light Railway.

Ernest E. Baguley (1863–1948) was a British engineer.

== Career ==
=== Employment ===
Baguley served an apprenticeship with R & W Hawthorn Leslie, initially at their Tyneside shipyard and later at their Forth Bank, Newcastle, locomotive works. In 1890 he moved to Stafford and became Chief Draughtsman for W G Bagnall Ltd. While at Bagnalls, he invented the Baguley valve gear for steam locomotives.

Baguley became interested in motor vehicles and, in 1901, he joined the Ryknield Engine Co Ltd of Burton-on-Trent. This company failed in 1905 and Baguley became Manager of its successor, the Ryknield Motor Company.

In 1907 Baguley moved to Birmingham as Manager of the newly formed Motor Division of the Birmingham Small Arms Company.

=== Baguley Cars Ltd ===
In 1911 he set up Baguley Cars Ltd which took over the assets of the (then defunct) Ryknield Motor Company. The new company started out manufacturing road vehicles, but branched out into locomotive manufacturing just before the First World War.

=== War Service ===
In the years leading up to the First World War, Baguley served in the Territorial Army and became Second-in-Command, 6th Battalion, North Staffordshire Regiment, rising to the rank of Major. He served in France from 1914 to 1915.

=== Baguley (Engineers) Ltd ===
After the War there was a decline in the production of road vehicles (probably due to competition from other manufacturers) and an increase in the production of railway equipment. The name of the company was changed from Baguley Cars Ltd to Baguley (Engineers) Ltd on 10 April 1923. Following a dispute with their partners Drewry Cars. Ltd, Baguley (Engineers) Ltd went into decline and entered liquidation in 1931. Most of the plant and effects, including Major Baguley's own Baguley car, were sold at auction on 10 November 1931.

=== E. E. Baguley Ltd ===
Major Baguley was a great survivor and, he set up a small repair business for Baguley products at Clarence Street, Burton-on-Trent. A new company, E. E. Baguley Ltd, was registered on 30 April 1932 and was soon building locomotives again. In 1934 E. E. Baguley Ltd moved to larger premises at Uxbridge Street, Burton-on-Trent. The company merged with Drewry to form Baguley-Drewry Ltd in 1962.

== Personal life ==
In June 1921, Baguley married E.G.M. Coussmaker, the daughter of the Rector of Hamstall Ridware in Staffordshire.

He retired in 1946, and died on 14 November 1948.

== Sources ==
- Baguley Locomotives 1914-1931 by Rodney Weaver, published by the Industrial Railway Society in 1975, ISBN 0-901096-22-9
- The Railway Products of Baguley-Drewry Ltd by Alan Civil and Roy Etherington, published by the Industrial Railway Society in 2008, ISBN 978-1-901556-44-5
