= Sittingbourne Viaduct railway station =

Railway station on a heritage railway

Sittingbourne Viaduct
- Kerr Stuart 0-4-2ST Premier arrives at Sittingbourne Viaduct, 2022

General information
- Location: Sittingbourne, Swale; England
- Coordinates: 51.3451231°N 0.7336651°E
- System: Station on heritage railway
- Owner: Sittingbourne and Kemsley Light Railway
- Manager: Sittingbourne and Kemsley Light Railway
- Platforms: 1
- Tracks: 4

Construction
- Parking: Yes
- Accessible: Yes

History
- Original company: Bowaters Paper Railway

Key dates
- 1969: opened
- 2007: services cease operation
- 27 May 2012: services resume
Location

Sittingbourne Viaduct railway station is a station on the Sittingbourne and Kemsley Light Railway. It serves as the Southern terminus for the railway. It was closed for 5 years from 2007 to 2012, before being reopened to regular passenger service.

== History ==
The station opened in 1969, alongside the preservation of the railway by the Locomotive Club of Great Britain. It was closed in 2007 after the railway ceased operations, and reopened on 27 May 2012.

In June 2014, the station suffered an arson attack which left only a platform shelter remaining. The railway made an appeal to raise £75,000 to install CCTV, fencing, a replacement of the platform as well as the construction of a new one, a new waiting room, and toilets on site. As of 2026: CCTV, fencing, toilets and a new platform have been installed.

In autumn 2023, work began to replace the existing platform with a new one, which will be higher to reach the train doors, and wider with a ramp leading up it to improve accessibility. The work was completed in 2025

== Facilities ==
The station consists of four tracks, although only two are used for passenger service (the other two are sidings, one of which houses freight wagons). The station has one platform and a run-round loop.

The station also holds a ticket office, parking, an accessible entrance and disabled toilets.
