= Ridham Dock =

Dock in Kent, England

Coordinates: 51°23′N 00°45′E

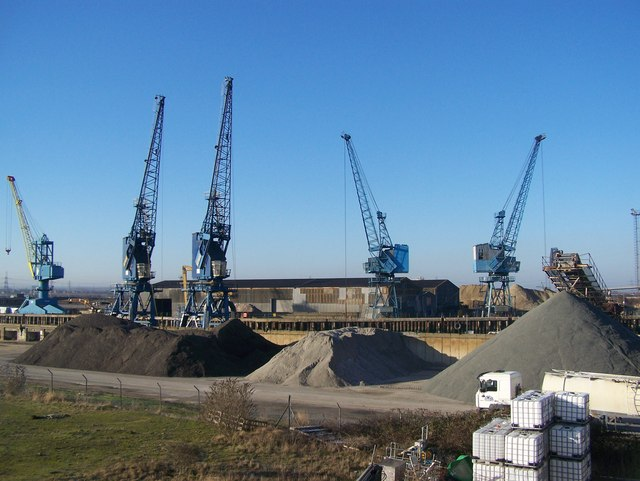
Waiting cranes in Ridham Docks, the truck in foreground is on unused railway tracks that lead to the Sheerness Line

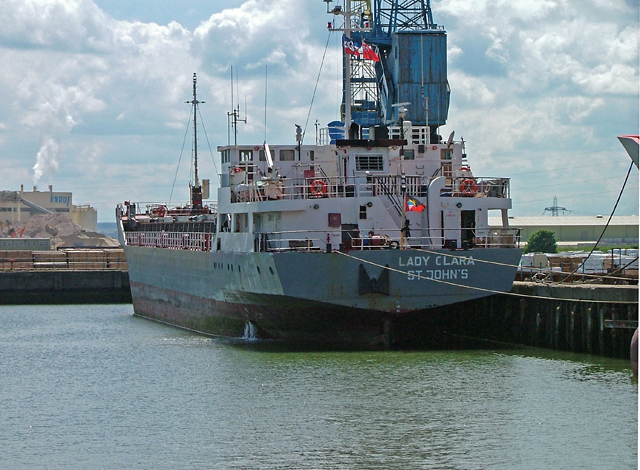
"Lady Clara" in Ridham Dock. May 2004

Ridham Dock is a dock on The Swale in the English county of Kent. It is located in the parish of Iwade around 4 miles (6.4 km) north of Sittingbourne.

== History ==
The dock was first planned to service the paper making industry in Sittingbourne. The dock was planned to provide a deeper water anchorage for ships servicing the paper mill and replace the need to use the silted Milton Creek. Construction began in 1913 but was halted by the onset of World War I, although the dock was used during the war for loading ammunition. The dock was finally completed in 1919, although until 1922 it was operated by the Royal Navy.

The opening of what was, at the time, Europe's largest paper mill at Kemsley, just 1 mile (1.6 km) south of the dock, in 1923 led to expansion of the facility. It was linked to both the paper mill at Kemsley and Sittingbourne Paper Mill by the Bowaters Paper Railway, a light railway network. Part of this is preserved as the Sittingbourne and Kemsley Light Railway. The dock facility was damaged in the 1953 flood event.

Parts of the dock were used by Sheerness Steelworks from 1973 until the closure of the steel works in 2002. After Finnish based paper company Metsa Serla bought the paper making plants of Bowater in 1998, the decision was made to sell the docks.

== Operations ==
Ridham Dock is on The Swale covering an area of 65 acres (26 ha). It is located immediately to the east of the Kingsferry Bridge and Sheppey Crossing linking the Isle of Sheppey to the mainland. It is linked to the A249 trunk road which provides access to the UK road network, including the M2 and M20 motorways, and to the national rail network via the Sheerness Line. A shunting locomotive operates at the dock.

The dock is operated by Ridham Sea Terminals and can accommodate shipping up to 5,000 long tons (5,100 t) in four NAABSA (Not Always Afloat But Safely Aground) berths. It has the capacity to load vessels using a 23 metres (75 ft) electric conveyor with a 40 tonne capacity crane available to load and unload containers. The dock has around 11,400 square metres (123,000 sq ft) of warehousing as well as open storage capacity.

== Combined heat and power plant ==
A combined heat and power plant with a net electrical capacity of 23 megawatts began construction in April 2013. The plant will be operated by German company MVV Energie and is expected to open in spring 2015. The plant will use around 172,000 tonnes of waste wood, including fibreboard and chipboard, a year to generate about 188 million kilowatt-hours of energy.
