= Monarch (locomotive) =

Articulated narrow-gauge locomotive built by Bagnall

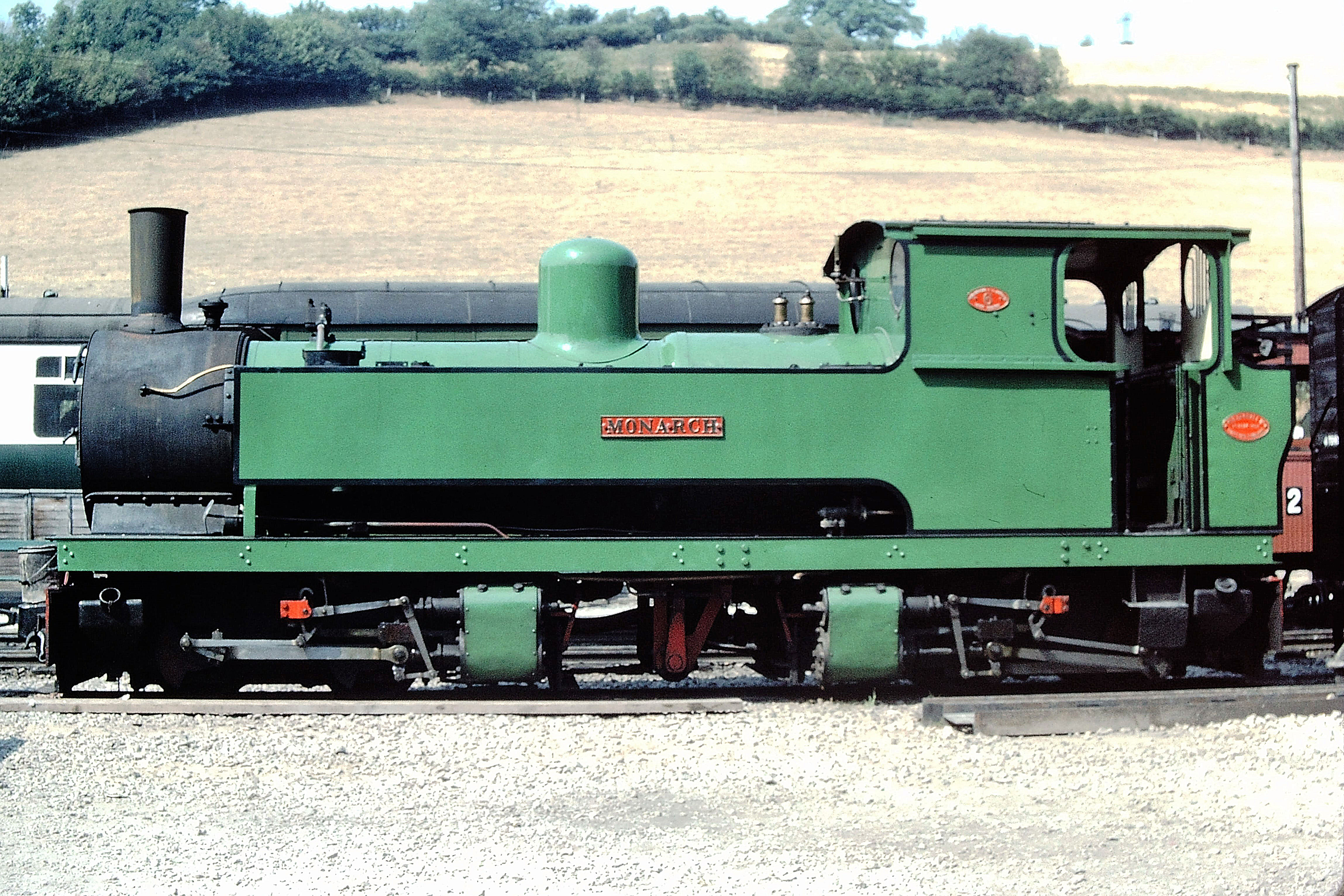
- Monarch at Llanfair Caereinion in 1976
Type and origin
- Power type: Steam
- Builder: W.G. Bagnall
- Serial number: 3024
- Model: W.G. Bagnall 'modified Meyer' articulated locomotive
- Build date: 1953
- Total produced: 1
Specifications
- Configuration
  - Whyte: 0-4-4-0T
  - UIC: B′B′ n4t
- Gauge: 2 ft 6 in (762 mm)
- Driver dia.: 2 ft 0 in (610 mm)
- Wheelbase: 18 ft 3 in (5,563 mm)
  - Coupled: 3 ft 3 in (991 mm)
- Loco weight: 28 long tons 10 cwt (63,800 lb or 29 t)
- Fuel capacity: 40 cu ft (1.1 m^{3})
- Water cap.: 500 imp gal (2,300 L; 600 US gal)
- Boiler pressure: 185 lbf/in^{2} (1,280 kPa)
- Cylinders: Four, outside
Performance figures
- Tractive effort: 12,737 lbf (56.66 kN)
Career
- Operators: Bowaters Paper Railway; Welshpool & Llanfair Light Railway
- Numbers: WLLR: 6
- Disposition: Displayed

Monarch is a narrow gauge steam locomotive, built by W. G. Bagnall Ltd., Stafford in 1953 for the Bowaters Paper Railway. The locomotive is constructed to a modified Meyer articulated design, and is the last industrial narrow gauge locomotive to be built for commercial use in the UK. It is the last of seven locomotives built to a similar design, the other six being built to 2 ft (610 mm) gauge and delivered to sugar estates in South Africa. Monarch is currently on public display at the Welshpool and Llanfair Light Railway.

== Design ==
The Meyer design for articulated locomotives uses two swivelling power bogies, with the boiler, water and coal supplies on a rigid frame above this, similar to how most large diesel or electric locomotives are now constructed.

A drawback to the Meyer design is the limited space between the bogies for the firebox. Bagnall avoided this with their modified design by using the Bagnall boiler, which they already used for small contractor's locos. This has a cylindrical rear drum, with a cylindrical firebox and ashpan within this. None of the firebox or ashpan needs to protrude below footplate level, avoiding interference with the rear bogie.

The locomotive was originally fitted with a spark-arresting chimney.

== History ==
=== Sittingbourne Paper Mills ===
Monarch was delivered on 31 July 1953 to the Bowaters Paper Railway in Sittingbourne (now the Sittingbourne and Kemsley Light Railway), where it worked until 1965. The locomotive was intended to work on the railway's main line, but its articulated design also let it negotiate tightly curved sidings.

=== Welshpool and Llanfair Railway (first time) ===
Monarch was acquired by the Welshpool and Llanfair Light Railway in 1966. After a test run that year the locomotive spent several years in storage and under overhaul before entering passenger service in August 1973. The locomotive proved less useful than was hoped. It was found difficult to drive on the steep gradients of the line and crews struggled with the marine-style firebox. The locomotive was modified to improve steaming but taken out of service in 1978.

=== Ffestiniog Railway ===
By 1992 the Welshpool and Llanfair Light Railway had enough other locomotives that Monarch was no longer required and was sold to the Ffestiniog Railway. It was intended to overhaul the locomotive, cut down its size to fit the loading gauge and regauge it for use on the 1 ft 11 1/2 in (597 mm) gauge track. The locomotive was dismantled and stored for possible future use on the Ffestiniog railway or Welsh Highland Railway.

=== Welshpool and Llanfair Railway (second time) ===
Monarch was repurchased by the Welshpool and Llanfair Light Railway and cosmetically restored. As of 2023 the locomotive is on display at Welshpool.

== Bibliography ==
- Cartwright, R.I. (1986). The Welshpool and Llanfair Light Railway Illustrated Guide. The Welshpool & Llanfair Light Railway Preservation Co Ltd.
- Binns, Donald; Koch, Gunter. Meyer Articulated Locomotives The Definitive History. Trackside Publications.
