= Kemsley Paper Mill =

Coordinates: 51°21′48.3″N 0°45′05.3″E

Kemsley Paper Mill is a paper mill located in the village of Kemsley near Sittingbourne in the English county of Kent.

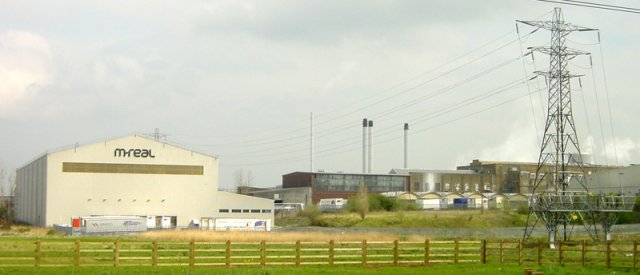
Kemsley Paper Mill

== Sittingbourne Paper Mill ==
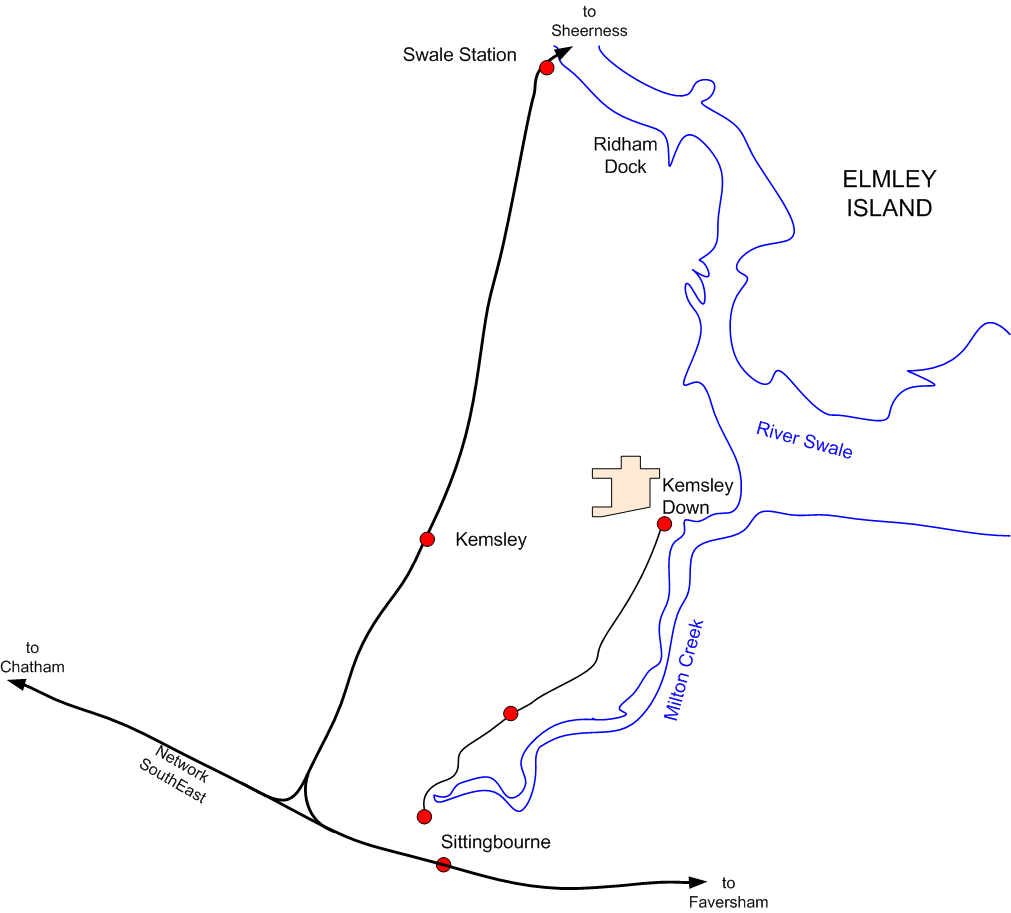
Railways in the Sittingbourne and Kemsley area

Paper manufacture started in Sittingbourne in 1708, when Peter Archer was recorded as a paper-maker. Sittingbourne Paper Mill existed from circa 1769, which by 1820 had grown and was owned by Edward Smith. After newspaper editor turned publisher Edward Lloyd bought the factory in 1863, it burnt down that August.

Covering paper production from his London sites with longer shift production, Lloyd had the Sittingbourne paper mill rebuilt in 1863, but closer to the new railway to enable easier shipping of product to his newspaper presses in Bow, East London. After purchasing the Daily Chronicle in 1876, Lloyd installed new machinery capable of producing 1,300 square feet (120 m^{2}) of paper per minute, and handed over management of the site to his youngest son, Frederick. By 1882, the transfer of paper-making from London to Sittingbourne was complete, enabled by using esparto grass imported from Algeria and Southern Spain via the creek port as a replacement for expensive cotton rag; the output supplied newsprint to his presses in Bow, East London.

The site's production capability was expanded by converting the mill to steam power, and, after the death of his father in 1889, eldest son Frank introduced a horse-drawn tramway to carry materials from a new wharf at Milton Creek to the mill. As the mill expanded and silt built up in Milton Creek, in 1904 the tramway was converted into a narrow gauge railway, to allow both ships and barges to offload pulp product at Ridham, for onward transport to the mill. On what is now known as the Sittingbourne and Kemsley Light Railway, the first of three steam locomotives came into operation in 1906, all being 0-4-2 Brazil type tank engines, sourced from Kerr Stuart.

In 1910, United Newspapers was created to buy out Lloyd's newspapers, separating it from the paper-making side which continued as Edward Lloyd Ltd. By 1912, the resultant investment made the Sittingbourne Paper Mill the largest producer of newsprint in the world, with 1200 employees using 17 machines to make over 2000 tonnes per week and supply the demands of Fleet Street.

=== New Kemsley Paper Mill ===
Following a shortage of pulp in the early 1920s, from 1924 Frank developed a new mill at Kemsley, together with a model village for its employees – this became the present-day Kemsley village. After his death in 1936, the renamed Lloyd Group was taken over by Sir William Berry, who formed the Bowater-Lloyd Group.

After both plants were acquired by Finnish-based paper company Metsa Serla in 1998, the decision was made to close the Sittingbourne Mill in October 2006, with the last reel being produced on 23 January 2007.

== Present ==
Today, the Sittingbourne site has been redeveloped, whilst the Kemsley mill is owned by DS Smith plc. With an annual production capacity of around 800,000 tonnes, it is the second biggest recovered fibre-based paper operation in Europe. Presently the plant produces K-Light testliner in white and brown, dual purpose liner/fluting, standard fluting and plasterboard liners.
