= Michael Hartnall =

Michael James Hartnall (born 10 July 1942) was a British businessman, a former non-executive director of BAE Systems plc (2003–2012) and former chairman of that company's audit committee.

Prior to joining BAE, Hartnall was a board member of Rexam for 14 years, latterly as Finance Director (CFO).

Hartnall was a member of the Hampel Committee on corporate governance.

He died on 5 November 2023 in Farnham, Surrey.
