= Chalkwell Coaches =

English bus and coach tour operator

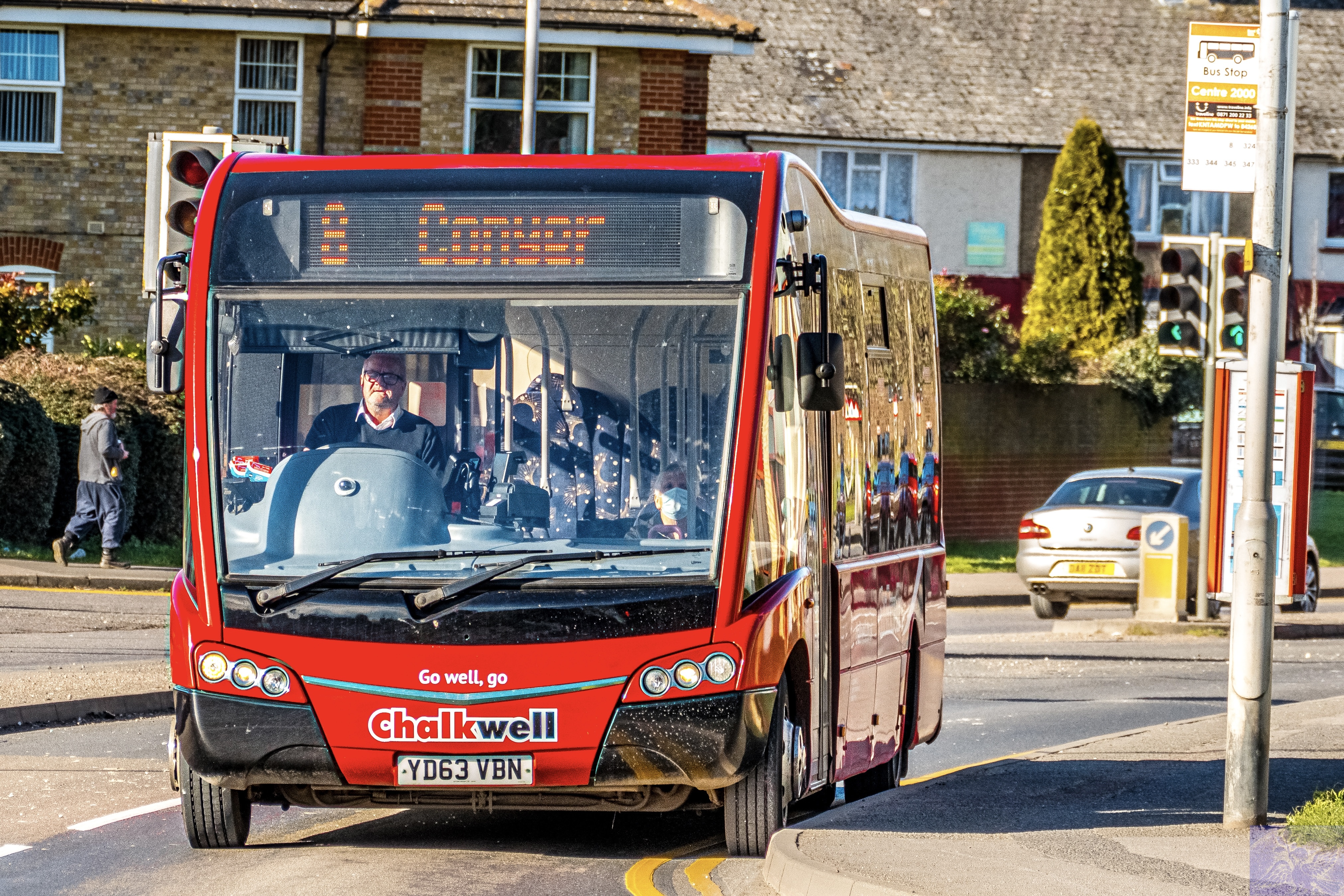
- A Chalkwell single-decker Optare Solo bus in Sittingbourne, 2022
- Parent: Clive Eglington
- Founded: 1931
- Headquarters: Sittingbourne
- Service type: Bus & coach operator
- Fleet: 28 (October 2014)
- Chief executive: Roland Eglinton
- Website: www.chalkwell.co.uk

Chalkwell Coaches is a bus and coach tour operator in Sittingbourne, Kent.

== History ==
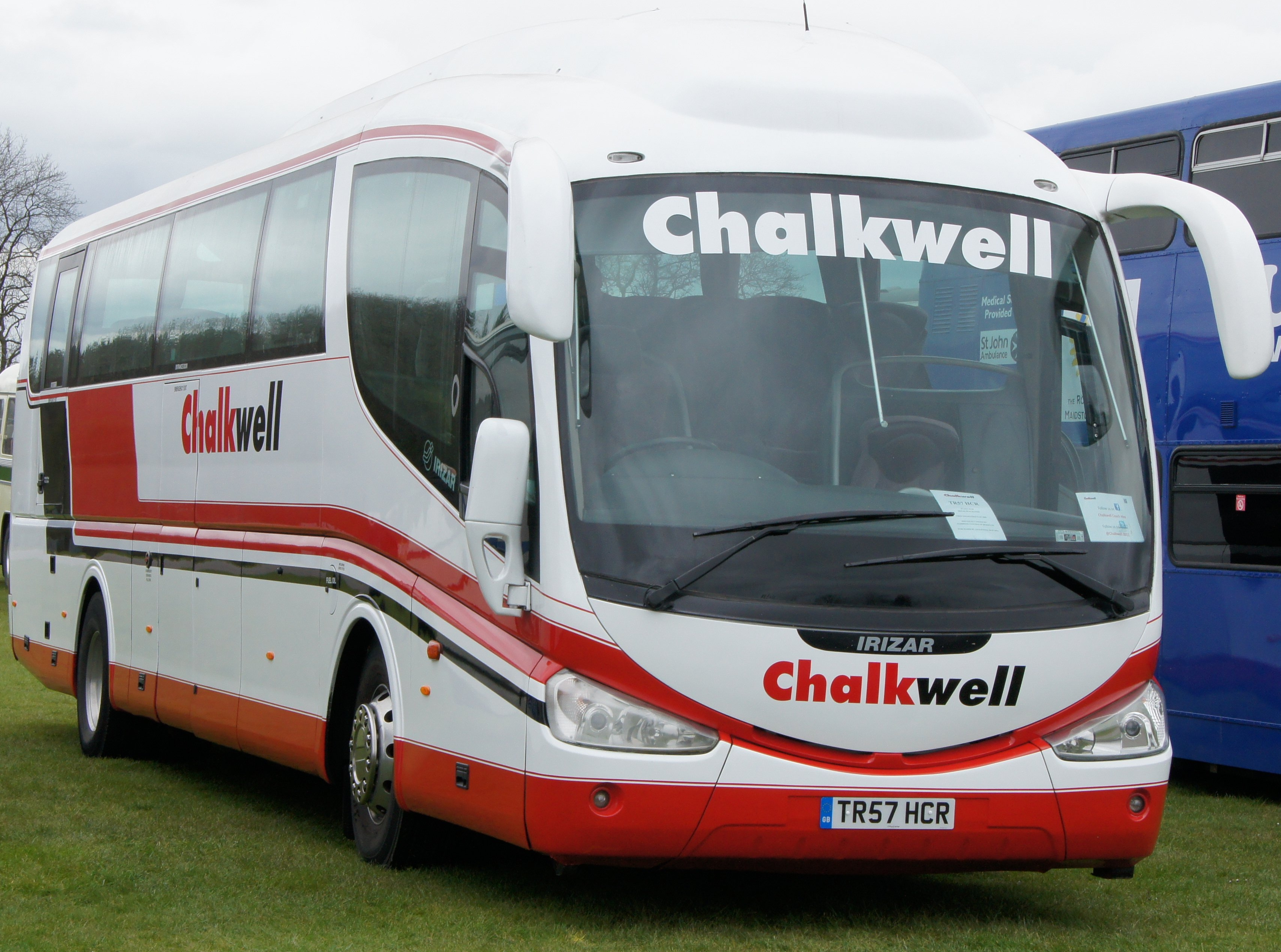
Chalkwell Scania K340EB coach at a bus rally, 2012

Chalkwell Coaches was founded in 1931 by Harry Eglington as Island Luxury Coaches. In April 1931 a short lived Sheerness to Stoke Newington service began. During World War II all seven coaches were requisitioned. In 1969, the business was taken over by Eglington's son Clyde.

In 1987, Chalkwell commenced its first local bus service from Doddington to Faversham. In 1990, it commenced operating services under contract to Kent County Council. In 1992, Chalkwell commenced operating Maidstone & District Motor Services day tour program.

In 1993, Downsway Coaches of Canterbury was acquired. In July 1993, it commenced operating commuter services from Sittingbourne to Central London.

On 12 July 2021, Chalkwell took over the operations of routes 360, 361 and 367 in Sheerness as a result of Arriva Southern Counties closing their depot in the town and handing the routes back to Kent County Council.

On 12 February 2023, most of the company's rural services in Sittingbourne, as well as the Sunday services in Sheerness were withdrawn as a result of funding for the routes being withdrawn by Kent County Council.

On 24 July 2023, Chalkwell took over the operation of route 334 between Sittingbourne and Sheerness following Arriva Southern Counties withdrawing from the service at the same time.

== Services ==
As of July 2023, Chalkwell operate eight local bus services in the Swale area, centred around the towns of Sittingbourne and Sheerness. The company also operates a number of school services in both areas.

Chalkwell currently operate the following services (excluding school services):

Route	Start	End
326/327	Chatham	Sittingbourne
334	Sittingbourne	Sheerness
347	Sittingbourne	Kemsley
349	Sittingbourne	Murston
360	Sheerness	Leysdown-on-Sea
361	Sheerness	Rushenden
362	Sheerness	West Minster

Chalkwell Coaches operated commuter coach routes 780, 781, 782 and 784 from Bearsted and Kings Hill to the Tate Britain in London until May 2017 when the routes were withdrawn.

== Fleet ==
As at October 2024, the fleet comprised 28 vehicles.
