= James Ritchie =

James Ritchie may refer to:

- James Ritchie (rugby union) (1907–1942), Scottish international rugby union player
- James Ritchie (naturalist) (1882–1958), President of the Royal Society of Edinburgh
- James Ritchie (Massachusetts politician) (1815–1873), American teacher and politician
- James Dale Ritchie (1976–2016), American serial killer
- James Ewing Ritchie (1820–1898), English journalist and writer
- James M. Ritchie (1829–1918), U.S. Representative from Ohio
- James Martin Ritchie (1917–1993), chairman of Bowater's
- James H. Ritchie Jr. (born 1961), member of the South Carolina Senate
- Sir James Ritchie, 1st Baronet (1835–1912), Lord Mayor of London
- James Ritchie & Son, Scottish clockmakers

== See also ==
- Jim Ritchie (disambiguation)
- Jamie Ritchie
