= Bowaters Paper Railway =

Narrow gauge railway in the UK

Coordinates: 51°21′01″N 0°44′27″E

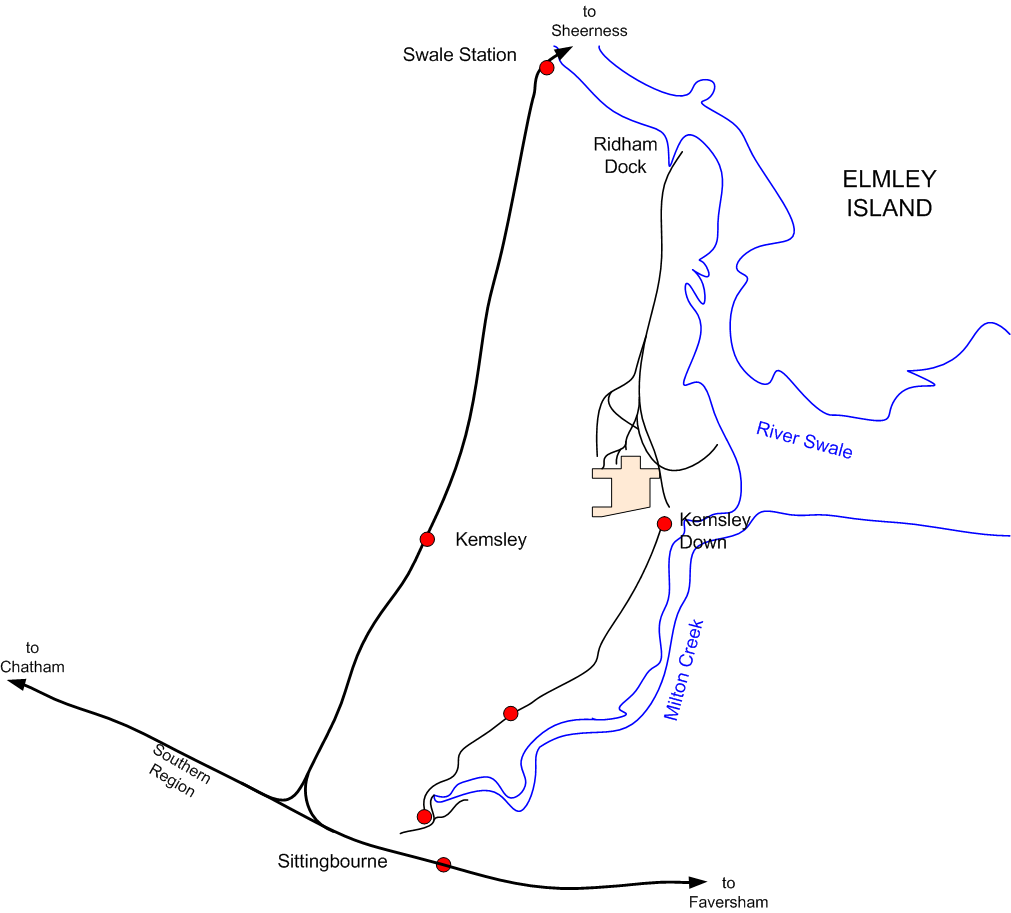

Overview
- Headquarters: Sittingbourne
- Locale: England
- Dates of operation: 1906–1969

Technical
- Track gauge: 2 ft 6 in (762 mm)
- Length: 10 miles (16.1 km)

The Bowaters Paper Railway was a 2 ft 6 in (762 mm) narrow gauge industrial railway running from Sittingbourne to Ridham Dock on The Swale in the county of Kent. It had the distinction of being the last steam-operated industrial narrow gauge railway in Britain when it closed in 1969. Part of the system still operates as the Sittingbourne & Kemsley Light Railway.

== History ==
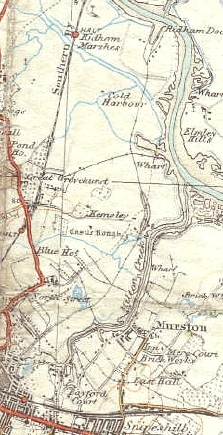
C1910 map

The manufacture of paper at Sittingbourne dates back to the seventeenth century. The paper mill was originally supplied with raw materials by barges that sailed to wharves at the head of Milton Creek. A short horse-hauled tramway moved pulp to the mill. Two steam locomotives were introduced in 1908.

In 1913, as Milton Creek began to silt up, the paper making company began work on the construction of Ridham Dock, a deepwater facility on the Swale estuary, where seagoing ships could unload raw materials and load finished paper products. At the start of the First World War the railway and the dock was taken over by the Admiralty and the railway was extended to connect the dock. After the end of the war the railway was returned to the paper company. In 1924 a second paper mill opened at Kemsley Down, and further extended in 1936. By this time, the railway reached its maximum length of 10 miles (16 km). There was also a standard gauge system around Kemsley and Ridham Dock that was connected to the Sheerness line near Swale.

== Closure, preservation and uncertain future ==
In 1969, a time and motion study by the then owners, The Bowater Paper Corporation (Bowater), resulted in the closure of the railway. By this time the railway was the last industrial narrow gauge railway in Britain operating steam locomotives and, until withdrawn from 30 September 1969, had operated a scheduled passenger service for its employees between the Sittingbourne mill and Ridham Dock. Bowaters had a "handing over" ceremony to the news lessees, the Locomotive Club of Great Britain (LCGB), on 4 October 1969 but continued running its goods trains until the final one on 25 October 1969. The LCGB was granted a lease of the southern portion of the railway between Sittingbourne and Kemsley Down in 1970. Much of the rest of the equipment went to form the Great Whipsnade Railway. The LCGB formed the Sittingbourne and Kemsley Light Railway Company to operate the railway. The company operates the railway under the name Sittingbourne & Kemsley Light Railway (S&KLR).

== Locomotives ==
Name	Builder	Wheel arrangement	Gauge	Works Number	Built	Notes	Photograph
Alpha	W.G. Bagnall	0-6-2T	2 ft 6 in (762 mm)	2472	1932	Undergoing cosmetic overhaul at the SKLR.	
Chevalier	Manning Wardle	0-6-2T	2 ft 6 in (762 mm)	1877	1915	Acquired from the Chattenden and Upnor Railway in 1950. Sold to the Great Whipsnade Railway, later resold to Bill Parker.	
Conqueror	W.G. Bagnall	0-6-2T	2 ft 6 in (762 mm)	2192	1922	Sold to the Great Whipsnade Railway, now part of the Vale of Rheidol Railway Museum Collection.	
Excelsior	Kerr Stuart	0-4-2ST	2 ft 6 in (762 mm)	1049	1908	Sold to the Great Whipsnade Railway in 1968–1970.	
Jubilee	W.G. Bagnall	0-4-0ST	4 ft 8 1/2 in (1,435 mm)	2542	1936	Now at the East Anglian Railway Museum.	
Leader	Kerr Stuart	0-4-2ST	2 ft 6 in (762 mm)	926	1905	Under overhaul on the SKLR.	
Melior	Kerr Stuart	0-4-2ST	2 ft 6 in (762 mm)	4219	1924	Awaiting overhaul on the SKLR.	
Monarch	W.G. Bagnall	0-4-4-0T	2 ft 6 in (762 mm)	3024	1953	Sold to the Welshpool and Llanfair Light Railway in 1966.	
Pioneer	Manning Wardle	0-4-0T	4 ft 8 1/2 in (1,435 mm)	942	1885	Acquired from Smith, Patterson & Co Ltd, Blaydon in 1943. Scrapped in 1954.	
Pioneer II	Ashford	0-6-0T	4 ft 8 1/2 in (1,435 mm)		1910	SECR P class no.178. Acquired from BR in 1958. Sold to the Bluebell Railway in 1969.	178 in SECR goods livery on the Bluebell Railway.
Premier	Kerr Stuart	0-4-2ST	2 ft 6 in (762 mm)	886	1905	Operational on the SKLR.	
Superb	W.G. Bagnall	0-6-2T	2 ft 6 in (762 mm)	2624	1940	Under overhaul on the SKLR.	
Superior	Kerr Stuart	0-6-2T	2 ft 6 in (762 mm)	4043	1920	Sold to the Great Whipsnade Railway in 1968–1970.	
Triumph	W.G. Bagnall	0-6-2T	2 ft 6 in (762 mm)	2511	1934	On display at the SKLR.	
Unique	W.G. Bagnall	2-4-0F	2 ft 6 in (762 mm)	2216	1924	A rare narrow gauge fireless locomotive. On display at the SKLR.	
Victor	W.G. Bagnall	0-4-0F	2 ft 6 in (762 mm)	2366	1929	A rare narrow gauge fireless locomotive. Scrapped in 1967.	
Rattler	W.G. Bagnall	0-4-0T	2 ft 6 in (762 mm)	1978	1913	Acquired from the Cape Copper Company, Swansea in 1942. Loco was in poor condition and did little work. Scrapped in 1950.	
-	Hudson Hunslet	4wDM	2 ft 6 in (762 mm)	4182	1953	Operational on the S&KLR with the name Victor.	
The Tank	English Electric	4wBE	2 ft 6 in (762 mm)	515	1921	Scrapped in 1969.	
-	Robert Stephenson and Hawthorns	6wDM	4 ft 8 1/2 in (1,435 mm)	2603/7889	1957	Class 04 D2259, acquired from BR in 1968. Scrapped in 1978.	
-	Vulcan Foundry	6wDM	4 ft 8 1/2 in (1,435 mm)	2551/D277	1955	Class 04 D2228, acquired from BR in 1969. Scrapped in 1979.	

== See also ==
- British narrow gauge railways
- Sittingbourne and Kemsley Light Railway
