= J.M. Ritchie =

J.M. Ritchie may refer to:

- James Ritchie (rugby union) (1907–1942), Scottish rugby union player
- James M. Ritchie (1829–1918), American politician
- James Martin Ritchie (1917–1993), chairman of Bowater's
- Jim Ritchie (businessman) (1907–1981), New Zealand businessman and Anglican church administrator
- Jim Ritchie (* 1929 in Montreal), Canadian sculptor
