= Sheerness Steelworks =

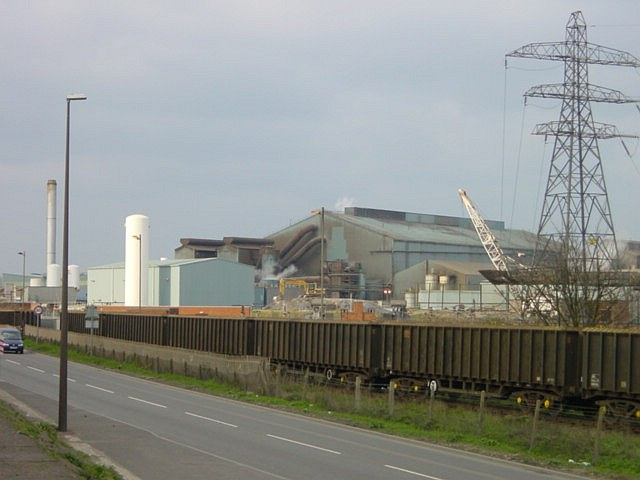
- Sheerness Steel Mill

- Location within Kent
- Built: 1971–1972
- Operated: 1972–2002, 2003–2012
- Location: Sheerness, Isle of Sheppey, Kent, England
- Coordinates: 51°26′23.4″N 0°45′08.6″E
- Industry: Steel making
- Products: Steel bar Steel rod Steel wire
- Employees: 400 (Thamesteel period)
- Volume: 1,400,000 tonnes (1,500,000 tons) Billet/Bar rod
- Owners: Co-Steel, 1972–1998; Allied Steel & Wire, 1998–2002; Thamesteel, 2002–2012; Liberty House, 2016–

Sheerness Steelworks was a steel plant located at Sheerness, on the Isle of Sheppey, in Kent, England. The plant opened in 1971 and produced steel via the Electric Arc Furnace (EAF) method rather than as a primary metal by the smelting of iron ore. The plant has closed down twice in its history, first in 2002 and again in 2012. Current owners, Liberty House, had announced plans to reopen part of the site in 2016.

== History ==
The UK government approved an application to build a steelworks in North Kent in May 1968. The output from the plant was due to be 188,000 tonnes (207,000 tons) per year, which was not seen as a threat to the operations of the nationalised British Steel. The steelworks was constructed on the site of a former dockyard, (Note: The dockyard had closed in 1960 with the loss of 700 jobs.) military port and hospital in Sheerness, Isle of Sheppey, Kent in 1971. However, the full commissioning of the steelworks was not complete until March 1972, and the plant was formally opened by the Duke of Edinburgh on 8 November 1972.

The Sheerness site made steel from scrap metal using the EAF method with scrap metal as opposed to the normal route, which was to smelt iron ore and carbon in a basic oxygen steelmaking (BOS) process, which, at that time, over half of the world's steel plants did. Because of this, it was described as a "mini-mill" in contrast to the integrated steelworks at Ravenscraig, Port Talbot, and Scunthorpe. The scrap metal was supplied by water-borne transport (from a scrapyard in Erith) or via inward rail transport, mostly south-eastern scrapyards (such as Ridham and some across London). In the latter stages of the steelworks (2003–2012), some of the scrap was sourced from areas out of the south-east such as Crossley's at Shipley and Thomson's scrapyard in Stockton-on-Tees.

In 1980, the plant was picketed by steelworkers who were striking at British Steel plants, and in 1984, miners who were on the miners' strike picketed the plant because the Co-Steel workers had not downed tools to join them on strike as other steelworkers had. However, Co-Steel, a Canadian registered company, was an independent steel-making concern and not part of the then Nationalised British Steel.

The 1980s were an unsettled period for the steel industry and the Co-Steel management implemented changes to working practices and also persuaded all employees to become salaried staff as part of the company with a medical plan. In doing so, the whole plant became non-union by 1992. This later led to picketing at the gates as union members accused the management of the plant of having a "Dickensian attitude" to its workers.

In December 1998, Allied Steel & Wire (ASW) made a bid to take over the Co-Steel plant so as to consolidate its power in the steel market in Europe. The takeover was described by analysts as a reverse takeover as Co-Steel was in profit at the time of the takeover and ASW was in debt. This amalgamation was completed by April 1999 with Sheerness losing 160 out of its 580 jobs, one furnace and its rod mill. In 2002, ASW went into administration and was subsequently bought by a Spanish firm, Celsa. This led to 320 redundancies from the plant and a protracted battle for some to get their pension money back from the defunct ASW. (Note: The former ASW workers were granted £12 billion from the European Court of Justice after a five-year battle)

In 2003, Thamesteel, a Saudi Arabian backed company, reopened the plant to produce steel billet and export it to the Middle-East. In January 2012, Thamesteel went into administration and the site later closed with the loss of 400 jobs. The plant had not produced any steel since November 2011.

In 2016, Peel Ports, the owners of the site, had 32 acres (13 ha) of the former steelworks site demolished and remediated at a final cost of £37 million. The work was undertaken to enable Peel Ports to enhance their car import and export business through the port. The works included infilling of the former steelworks cooling ponds and adding new warehousing and an improved rail connection. In the same year, Liberty House announced its intention to lease the remainder of the site, as the rolling mill on site was capable of producing up to 750,000 tonnes (830,000 tons) of rolled steel per year. Initial estimations were that the site would employ 60 people and possibly up to a further 40 employees if business was sufficient. The Electric Arc Furnace on site was dismantled and taken to the Liberty Steel works at Newport in South Wales as this was far cheaper than having a new EAF built at Newport.

== Statistics ==
Owners	Year	Employees	Products	Volume	Notes
Co-Steel	1998	580			
ASW	2002	300			
Thamesteel	2012	400	Bar & Billet	840,000 tonnes (930,000 tons) Billet; 600,000 tonnes (660,000 tons) Bar rod	
