= Graham Chipchase =

British businessman (born 1963)

Graham Chipchase CBE
- Born: Graham Andrew Chipchase; 17 January 1963 (age 63)
- Education: Oriel College, University of Oxford
- Occupation: Businessman
- Years active: 1984–present
- Title: CEO, Brambles Limited
- Term: 2017–present
- Successor: Incumbent
- Spouse: married
- Children: 1

Graham Andrew Chipchase CBE (born 17 January 1963) is a British businessman. He is the chief executive officer (CEO) of Brambles, an Australian logistics company.

In the 2024 Birthday Honours, Graham Chipchase was appointed a Commander of the Order of the British Empire (CBE) for services to sustainable business.

== Early life ==
He has a bachelor's degree in chemistry from Oriel College, University of Oxford.

== Career ==
Chipchase was announced as the incoming CEO of Australian-based company Brambles Limited on 18 August 2016. Chipchase commenced with Brambles as CEO designate on 1 January 2017, working with outgoing CEO Tom Gorman for a two-month transitional period until he assumed the role as CEO on 1 March 2017. Previously Chipchase had been the CEO of Rexam since 4 January 2010, joining the company as finance director on 10 March 2003.

Chipchase started his career with Coopers & Lybrand, where he trained as a chartered accountant. Later he joined BOC Group, serving as corporate finance manager since 1990, rising to director of planning and financial control. In 2001, he joined GKN, as finance director of its aerospace services business.

Chipchase was a non-executive director at AstraZeneca from 2012 to 2021.

== Personal life ==
Chipchase is married with one son and two stepdaughters. His hobbies are playing golf, wine collecting, and supporting Manchester United and the Red Bull Racing Formula One team.
