= Chattenden and Upnor Railway =

Military railway in Upnor, Kent, England (1885–1961)

Coordinates: 51.418°N 0.530°E

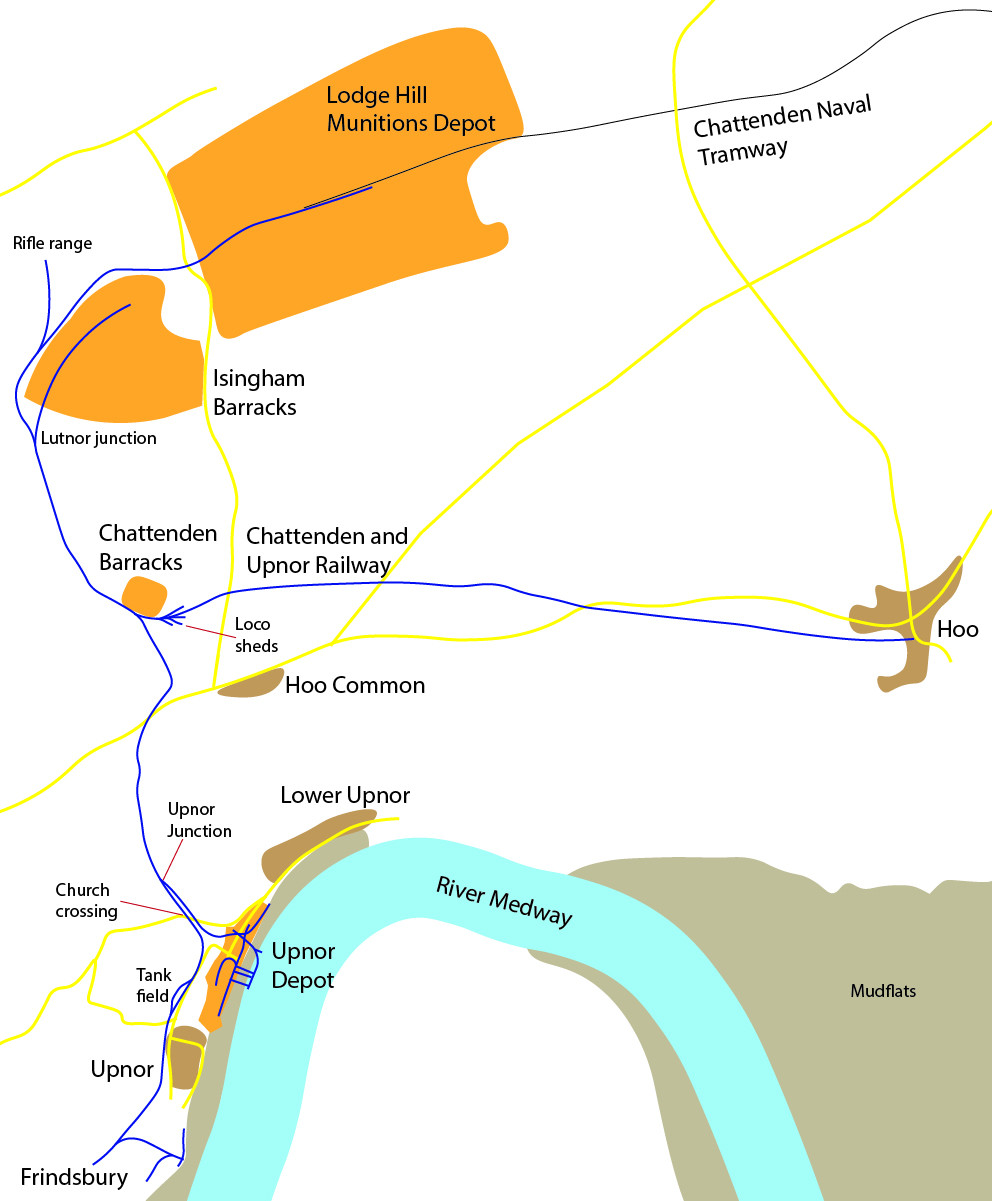
- The route of the Chattenden and Upnor Railway

Overview
- Headquarters: Chattenden
- Locale: England
- Dates of operation: 1885–1961
- Successor: Abandoned

Technical
- Track gauge: 2 ft 6 in (762 mm)

The Chattenden and Upnor Railway (also known as the Lodge Hill and Upnor Railway) was a narrow gauge railway serving the military barracks and depot at Upnor, Kent, and associated munitions and training depots. It started life in the early 1870s as a standard-gauge railway. The 2 ft 6 in (762 mm) narrow gauge working began in 1885, initially in a mixed gauge formation with the standard gauge, and after c. 1903 2 ft 6 in (76 cm) gauge exclusively. In the latter form the line continued in use until the end of 1961.

== History ==
=== Precursors ===
The first railway at Chattenden was a standard gauge line laid by the Royal Engineers in the early 1870s. This was used to bring building materials from a wharf at Upnor to be used in the construction of the Chattenden Munitions Depot. According to a report in the issue of "Iron" dated Saturday 29 May 1875: "A detachment of non-commissioned officers and men of the Royal Engineers, commanded by Lieutenant Barker, on Saturday left the School of Military Engineering at Chatham for Upnor, where they will be quartered for some time, as they are to be employed to lay down lines of rails to connect forts on the Thames and Medway with the new powder magazines to be constructed at Chattenden Roughs, a few miles from the old magazines at Upnor Castle. It is expected that more than forty miles of these railways will be constructed." This railway fell out of use when the building work was completed.

An 18 in (457 mm) railway is thought to have been laid to help with the construction of the standard gauge line. An 0-4-0ST locomotive, called Burgoyne, built by Manning Wardle in 1873 (works no. 448), would have been used in construction, although it may also have been used on the Chatham Eastern Defences 18 inch gauge railway and worked on Borstal Prison construction work. Burgoyne was identical as built to Busy Bee (Manning Wardle 424 of 1872 for the Admiralty at Chatham Dockyard) and was a member of the classic Manning Wardle '6 by 8' 0-4-0ST specification.

=== Opening ===
In 1885, members of the Royal School of Military Engineering laid an experimental 2 ft 6 in (762 mm) gauge railway on the trackbed of the standard gauge line, initially retaining the standard gauge as a third rail in at least some places. The steep gradients involved allowed the engineers to test the effectiveness of narrow-gauge railways over hilly terrain (according to an article in 'The Locomotive' magazine in 1903, some standard gauge was still extant at this stage). The last standard gauge locomotives were transferred to the Royal Arsenal at some stage between 1898 and 1906.The 1885 gauge adaptation was at the behest of Royal Engineers officers such as Major John Hogg, who were mindful of the shortcomings of the 18 inch gauge lines laid during the abortive Suakin Campaign of the Spring that year. At the time 2 ft 6 in (762 mm) gauge railways were being used extensively in the North-West Frontier Province of India. Sadly, although no steam locomotives of the Royal Engineers era on the C. & U.R. currently survive, probably the main legacy of the railway in this era was the use of 36 2 ft. 6 in. gauge Bagnall 2-4-2ST's supplied to the Indian States Military Railways in 1901–05 as a Strategic Reserve. Examples saw use in Mesopotamia during World War One and two survive in India today. The locomotives, although of a different wheel arrangement, showed a marked family resemblance to Bagnall 1514 of 1897 (see below).

=== World Wars ===
The Chattenden and Upnor Railway line was taken over by the Admiralty on 1 April 1906. Two new locomotives, Fisher and Chevalier were purchased just after the start of the First World War to deal with the rise in munitions traffic. In 1918, five Greenwood and Batley battery-electric locomotives were purchased, to work the lines into the munitions stores where steam locomotives were a fire risk.

In 1931 the railway had 91 powder wagons, 16 box wagons to carry ammunition, 17 assorted wagons for ballast, an officers' carriage, 7 workmen's carriages, 3 brake vans, and a breakdown van.

Two final steam locomotives, Burnett Hall and Norbury were purchased in 1933 and 1934. These were the main locomotives in use at the start of the Second World War. In 1943, the first of a series of diesel locomotives were purchased.

=== Closure ===
By 1896, the last 1/4 mile (0.40 km) of the Hoo branch had been lifted, with the remainder removed by 1909.

By 1941, the section of the branch from Upnor to the Tank Field signal box was mostly out of use, and the remaining section to Pontoon Hard (Upper Upnor) was closed. The rest of the line closed on 31 December 1961. The track was lifted in December 1965.

=== Passenger services ===
The line was never opened to the public, but passenger services were run for munitions workers. In 1891 there were nine passenger trains running each day.

During the Second World War, passenger trains were revived using bogie carriages built by Charles Roberts & Co. Ltd. in 1942. These continued until 19 May 1961.

== Route ==
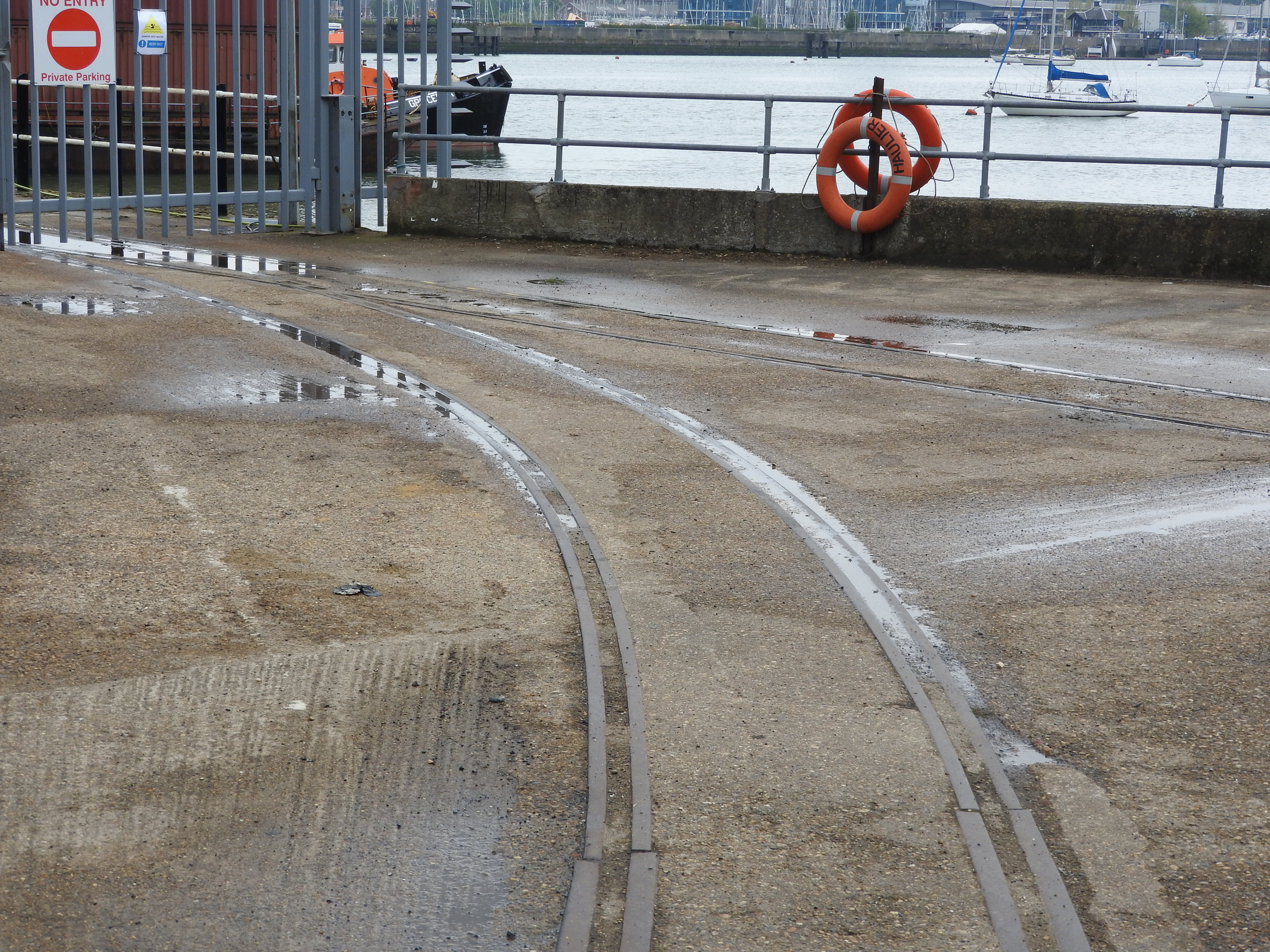
Upnor Depot in 2017 with rails still in situ

The railway started at the Lodge Hill munitions depot, at interchange sidings with the standard gauge Chattenden Naval Tramway. It curved around the west end of Chattenden Magazines Enclosure to Lutnor Junction, where a branch ran back into the magazines. The main line continued southeast for 1/4 mile (0.40 km) to Chattenden Barracks, where the line's locomotive sheds and workshops were located. A long branch ran east from here to the village of Hoo.

South of Chattenden Barracks, the line rose on an embankment to cross the A228 road on an overbridge. It then continued south to Upnor Junction, where two branches ran down to the bank of the River Medway. One branch ran west past Tank Field, to the Upper Pontoon Hard near Frindsbury. The other ran into the Upnor Depot.

The railway had several sections of steep gradients. From Upnor Depot to Church Crossing the line rose at 1 in 26, from there to Upnor Junction the gradient was 1 in 30. There was also a section of 1 in 34 approaching the west gate of Lodge Hill depot.

== Accidents ==
On 17 March 1907, Colonel Brabazon, the senior officer at Lodge Hill Depot, had a photograph taken of the 78 employees. The locomotive Lancashire hauled a special train to bring all the employees up to the depot. The driver was in the group, waiting for the photograph to be taken when the locomotive began to move. It ran away on the downhill gradient in the direction of Upnor and derailed on the curve around Issingham Barracks. The line only had a 5-ton jackscrew and a large crew spent most of the next day re-railing the locomotive.

== Standard gauge locomotives ==
=== Built for the Army ===
Name/Number	Builder	Type	Date	Works number	Image	Notes
Steam Sapper No. 5	Aveling & Porter	2-2-0 GT Single Cylinder	1872	830		The 'Steam Sappers' were mainly Aveling and Porter road locomotives (one of which, Steam Sapper No. 8 saw use during the Anglo-Ashanti Conflict of 1873–74) although three of their number were fitted with rail wheels, one for trial purposes and two as built. It seems that Nos. 5 and 9 constituted the original mechanical power on the C. & U. R. The main advantage of these single cylinder machines lay in the fact that they could be put to use to drive stationary machinery but their lack of springing and slow overall speed would have ensured that they would have been of limited use in ordinary service.
Steam Sapper No. 9	Aveling & Porter	2-2-0 GT Single Cylinder	1872	722		Originally delivered to War Department, Shoeburyness as a road locomotive. Fitted with rail wheels in 1873 at transferred to the Chattenden system.
Steam Sapper No. 12	Aveling & Porter	2-2-0 GT Single Cylinder	1877	1316		
Royal Engineer	Manning Wardle & Co.	0-4-0ST Outside Cylinder	1876	602		Later sold to Wm. Rigby & Co., Erith
Vauban	Manning Wardle & Co.	0-4-0ST Outside Cylinder	1885	937		Built for Suakin Campaign. To Royal Arsenal Railways, Woolwich as Thor circa 1903. To W.D. Slough 1918. Scrapping date unknown.
Burgoyne	Manning Wardle & Co.	0-6-0ST Inside Cylinder	1885	949		Built for Suakin Campaign. To Royal Arsenal Railways, Woolwich as Kimberley circa 1903. To J. F. Wake, Darlington 11/1919. Scrapped after 6/1925.
	Manning Wardle & Co.	0-4-0ST Outside Cylinder	1885	962		Built for Suakin Campaign. To Royal Arsenal Railways, Woolwich as Lord Roberts circa 1903. Scrapped 1/1916 after re-instatement 6/1914.

== 2 ft. 6 in. gauge locomotives ==
=== Built for the Army ===
Name/Number	Builder	Type	Date	Works number	Image	Notes
Carbon	Yorkshire Engine Company	0-4-2T	1885	404		Scrapped by 1914
Sulphur	Yorkshire Engine Company	0-4-2T	1885	405		Identical to Carbon. Scrapped 1932
Yorkshire	John Fowler	0-4-4T	1887	5350		Scrapped after sighting near Strood Station 1932.
Cheshire	W.G. Bagnall	0-4-2T	1890	1260		Lower leading part of mainframe with coupled wheels and cylinders detachable and exchangeable with Cumberland Experimental design for potential front line use. Ex-War Department, Crewe. Scrapped after sighting near Strood Station 1932.
Lancashire	Yorkshire Engine Company	0-4-4T	1891	462		Scrapped after sighting near Strood Station in 1932.
Cumberland	Lowca Engineering Company	0-4-2T	1893	220		Lower leading part of mainframe with coupled wheels and cylinders detachable and exchangeable with Cheshire Experimental design for potential front line use. Withdrawn by 1904 advertised for sale and scrapped circa 1909.
Stafford, later Eardley Wilmot	W.G. Bagnall	0-6-0T	1897	1513		ex-War Department, South Africa, 1901. Renamed Eardley Wilmot 1915. Scrapped in 1941.
Bagnall	W.G. Bagnall	0-6-0ST	1897	1514		ex-War Department, South Africa, 1901. Scrapped after sighting near Strood Station 1932
Lord Kitchener	Yorkshire Engine Company	0-6-2T	1902	711		New. To Chatham Dockyard for scrap 1948; scrapped 1954.
Pioneer	Yorkshire Engine Company	2-6-2ST	1903	757		Experimental design for potential front line use. Oil Fired as built. Bar frames. To Woolmer Instructional Military Railway in 1905. To the Pentewan Railway in 1912. To Government 1918. For Sale at Newbury Racecourse 1922 shortly afterwards scrapped.
none	Richard Hornsby & Sons	0-6-6-0DM	1903	6234		Hornsby-Akroyd 20 hp compression-ignition (semi-diesel) engine. Underpowered, inefficient transmission, noisy and difficult to start. Disposal unknown.
Ascension	Avonside Engine Company	0-4-0T	1904	1480		To Admiralty, Hoo Fort, by 1928.

=== Built for the Admiralty ===
Name/Number	Builder	Type	Date	Works number	Image	Notes
Eardley Wilmot	McEwan Pratt	0-6-0PM	1911	not known		Unfinished when McEwan Pratt went into receivership in 1911. Completed at Chatham Dockyard but never successful. 80 hp 4cyl petrol engine. Offered for sale as scrap 1922.
Chevallier	Manning Wardle	0-6-2T	1915	1877		Sold to the Bowaters Paper Railway in 1950, subsequently sold to the Great Whipsnade Railway
Fisher	Dick Kerr and Company	0-6-2T	1915	13996		Scrapped 1954
Burnett Hall	Avonside	0-4-2T	1933	2070		Scrapped 1956. Nameplate on display at Amberley Museum.
Norbury	Peckett	0-4-2T	1934	1868		Scrapped 1955. Nameplate on display at Amberley Museum.
83	Ruston and Hornsby	4wDM	1943	213838		Sold 1960
Yard No. 92	Hunslet	0-6-0DM	1946	3301		Sold 1961
Yard No. 84	Ruston and Hornsby	4wDM	1947	242919		To RNAD Crombie
Yard No. 85	Drewry	0-6-0DM	1949	2263		Transferred to RNAD Ernsettle in October 1960, then to the Welshpool and Llanfair Light Railway in 1968 and named Chattenden
Yard No. 44	Hibberd Planet	4wDM	1954	3687		Sold to the Welshpool and Llanfair Light Railway in 1962, named Upnor Castle, sold to the Ffestiniog Railway and regauged to 1 ft 11 1/2 in (597 mm)
Yard No. 45	Ruston and Hornsby	4wDM	1952	268878		Moved to RNAD Ernsettle in November 1960.

=== Battery-electric ===
A large number of battery-electric locomotives were used, mainly to move munitions around the Lodge Hill depot. Six supplied in 1928 were also suitable for use on the main line. They had central cabs with large square-cornered windows and tramway skirts covering the wheels. These were replaced by six Greenwood and Batley 8-ton locomotives built between 1938 and 1945.

The rest of the battery-electric fleet were motorised wagons without cabs that were restricted to use in the depot. Twenty-four were supplied by Greenwood and Batley in batches between 1918 and 1948. Seven came from Wingrove & Rogers and two were built in the workshops at Lodge Hill.

== Rolling stock ==
Number	Type	Size	Version	Builder	Year	Image	Notes
1	Brake Van		v1	Oldbury			Angled bay window sides
	Brake Van		v1a	Oldbury			Straight bay window sides
212	Brake Van		v2				
213	Brake Van		v2				Converted to Breakdown Van
	Four Wheel Coach		v1				
	Four Wheel Coach		v2				Converted to Ambulance Van
	Combination Coach		v1				
	Combination Coach		v2	Wickham & Co.	1957		
196	Bogie Coach		v2	Cravens	1941		In preservation at the Sittingbourne and Kemsley Light Railway
198	Bogie Coach		v2	Cravens	1941		
199	Bogie Coach		v2	Cravens	1941		In preservation at the Sittingbourne and Kemsley Light Railway
200	Bogie Coach		v2	Cravens	1941		In preservation at the Sittingbourne and Kemsley Light Railway
202	Bogie Coach		v1				
204	Bogie Coach		v1				Under restoration at the Sittingbourne and Kemsley Light Railway
12	Bogie Van	10T		Oldbury			
16	Bogie Flat	10T		Leeds Forge Co.			
18	Bogie Well Wagon	10T					
19	Bogie Low Side	10T		Leeds Forge Co.			
20	Bogie Low Side	10T		R.Y. Pickering			
21	Bogie Low Side	10T		R.Y. Pickering			
26	Bogie Low Side	10T		R.Y. Pickering			
27	Bogie Low Side	10T		R.Y. Pickering			
28	Bogie Low Side	10T		R.Y. Pickering			
32	Bogie Low Side	10T		Cravens			
33	Bogie Low Side	10T		Cravens			
35	Bogie Low Side	10T		Cravens			
38	Bogie Low Side	10T		Cravens			
41	Bogie Low Side	10T		Cravens			
45	Bogie Low Side	10T					
48	Bogie High Side	10T	v1				
60	Bogie High Side	10T	v2	Cravens			
65	Bogie High Side	10T	v2	Cravens			
66	Bogie High Side	10T	v2	Cravens			
53	Powder Van	3T	v1				Wood Frames. Height modified to match 5T. Early photo (probably renumbered at a later date).
69	Powder Van	3T	v1b				
99	Powder Van	3T	v1				Wood Frames
110	Powder Van	3T	v1a				
111	Powder Van	3T	v1				Wood Frames
130	Powder Van	3T	v1a				
158	Powder Van	3T	v5				Angled Roof
179	Powder Van	3T	v4				Angled Roof
106	Powder Van	5T	v5a				Angled Roof
68	Powder Van	5T	v2				
97	Powder Van	5T	v2				
121	Powder Van	5T	v6				
142	Powder Van	5T	v6				
69	Powder Van	5T	v3				Early photo (probably renumbered at a later date as a 3T van was also numbered 69).
112	Powder Van	5T	v3				
128	Powder Van	5T	v3				
137	Powder Van	5T	v3				
140	Powder Van	5T	v3				
171	Powder Van	5T	v3				

== See also ==
- British narrow gauge railways
- Industrial Railway Society
