= Jim Ritchie =

Jim Ritchie may refer to:

- Jim Ritchie (businessman) (1907–1981), New Zealand businessman and Anglican church administrator
- Jim Ritchie (rugby union) (born 1926), Irish rugby union player

== See also ==
- James Ritchie (disambiguation)
