= Thomas Lushington =

British author and theologian (1590–1661)

Dr. Thomas Lushington
- Born: 1590; Sandwich, Kent
- Died: 22 December 1661 (aged 70–71); Sittingbourne, Kent
- Resting place: St Michael's Church, Sittingbourne, Kent
- Education: BA, MA, BD, DD

Thomas Lushington (1590–1661) was a British author and theologian, born in 1590 Sandwich, Kent and baptised in Hawkinge, near Folkestone on 2 September 1590. He was the son of Ingram and Agnes Lushington, and was one of four children. He is best known for being the tutor to Sir Thomas Browne, author of Religio Medici. However, he is also known for being a controversial preacher, having been later accused of heresy.

== Education ==
Lushington attended the Canterbury Cathedral Foundation at The King's School, Canterbury. Later enrolling at Broadgates Hall, Oxford on 15 March 1607; graduated with a Bachelor of Arts (BA) from Lincoln College, Oxford in 1616, and a Master of Arts (MA) in 1618. Following this he returned to Broadgates Hall to study Theology and to tutor. It was here that Thomas Browne became his pupil.

Lushington achieved Bachelor of Divinity (BD) in 1627 and the Doctor of Divinity (DD) in 1632.

== Career ==
Whilst studying Lushington had a number of public jobs, prior to taking up his tutoring post at Broadgates Hall. His career at Oxford came to an end after becoming close friends with Richard Corbet who assisted him in securing his future positions. Both were described as men of William Laud.

Initially, Corbett got Lushington the chaplaincy to Charles I of England. This was followed in 1631 with Lushington becoming a Prebendary of Salisbury. In 1632 Lushington moved to Norwich with Corbett. Archbishop Laud is said to have been attempting to rule all Anglican England and therefore used Corbett and Lushington to help reclaim East Anglia for the Church. Thus, Lushington gained positions in the benefices of Barton Turf and Neatheshead (Neatishead), Norfolk; and in 1636 in Felixstowe and Walton, Suffolk.

By 1639 Lushington had to forfeit his benefices in Norwich to Presbyterians and was presented by the King to the rectory of Burnham-Westgate in 1639, and Burnham-St. Mary, Burnham-St. Margaret and Burnham-All Saints, all within the district of Hunstanton, Norfolk in 1640. According to the plague in St. Mary's Church, Burnham Westgate, Lushington was Rector (ecclesiastical) between 1639 and 1655.

== Reputation ==
In April 1624 or 1625, Lushington preached the Easter Monday Sermon at St Mary's, Oxford which was received with applause by the congregation. However, it was not welcomed by all. Some felt it was shockingly theatrical and because part of it reflected on King James I's Spanish policy, Lushington denounced the popular desire for war with Spain, as well as contemptuous words about Parliament and the House of Commons, he was forced to deliver a recantation sermon the following Sunday. It is suggested that these sermons set his reputation for the rest of his career, and was even noted in Serenus de Cressy's later works.

He experienced various attacks over the years accusing him of heretical opinions and socianianism, largely following comments by the "Puritan" Rev. Edmund Porter. His attacks would see Lushington return to Sittingbourne in 1655.

== Literary works ==
- The expiation of a sinner in a commentary vpon the Epistle to the Hebrevves (1646)
- The justification of a sinner being the maine argument of the Epistle to the Galatians / by a reverend and learned divine. (1650)
- A treatise on the theology of Proclus (1650)
- Logica analytica (1650)
- The Resurrection rescued from the souldiers calumnies, in two sermons preached at St. Maries in Oxon (1659). Published under the name Robert Jones D.D.

There is debate around whether Lushington did in fact write Commentaries of the Epistle of the Hebrews. Initially the book had been written under the author "G.M" when it was first published in 1646. However, when it was reissued, "G.M" had been replaced with "T.L.D.D", reportedly Thomas Lushington Doctor of Divinity. Allegedly there is no record of him, or his supporters, denying authorship, and it has been suggested the attribution of the works could be down to Rev. Edmund Porter.

== Death ==
Lushington died in Sittingbourne, Kent on 22 December 1661, aged 72. He was buried on 26 December in the south chancel of St. Michael's Church, Sittingbourne where a monument was erected in his memory. No traces of the monument remain which was destroyed in a fire in July 1762.
