= Kemsley =

Area of Sittingbourne, Kent, England

Coordinates: 51.36°N 0.74°E

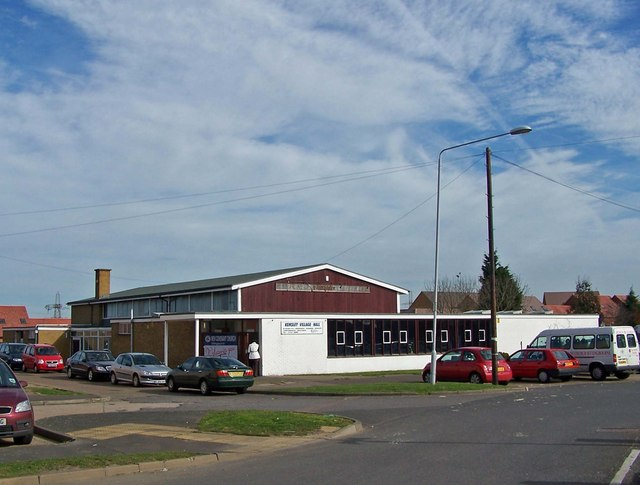
- Village hall, Kemsley

- Location within Kent
- Population: 6,100 (2005); 7,621 (2011)
- OS grid reference: TQ905660
- District: Swale
- Shire county: Kent
- Region: South East
- Country: England
- Sovereign state: United Kingdom
- Post town: Sittingbourne
- Postcode district: ME10
- Police: Kent
- Fire: Kent
- Ambulance: South East Coast
- UK Parliament: Sittingbourne and Sheppey

Kemsley, once a separate village, is now a suburb of Sittingbourne in Kent, England.

According to Asserius Menevensis in his contemporary survey, the Danes built a fortress or castle here in 893 at a place called 'Kemsley downe'. This later became 'Castle Rough'.

At the end of the 19th century, the site of the village was simply a row of cottages beside a brick works, located close to the remains of the medieval fortified manor house Castle Rough.

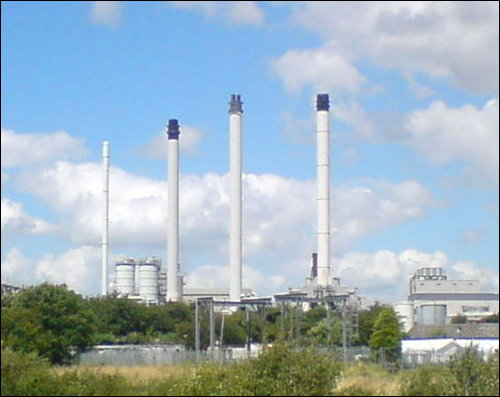
Kemsley Paper Mill

In 1924, with expansion impossible at the old Sittingbourne Paper Mills, owner Edward Lloyd built the new Kemsley Paper Mill, which served by a creek allowed the direct importation of raw materials to the site. At the same time he built a garden village to house his employees, the core of which comprises the modern day Kemsley village. The narrow gauge industrial railway which served the factory is now the preserved Sittingbourne and Kemsley Light Railway, a tourist attraction. Kemsley railway station is on the Sheerness Line.
