= Sittingbourne and Kemsley Light Railway =

Heritage railway in Kent, England

Coordinates: 51°21′27″N 0°45′13″E

Sittingbourne & Kemsley Light Railway
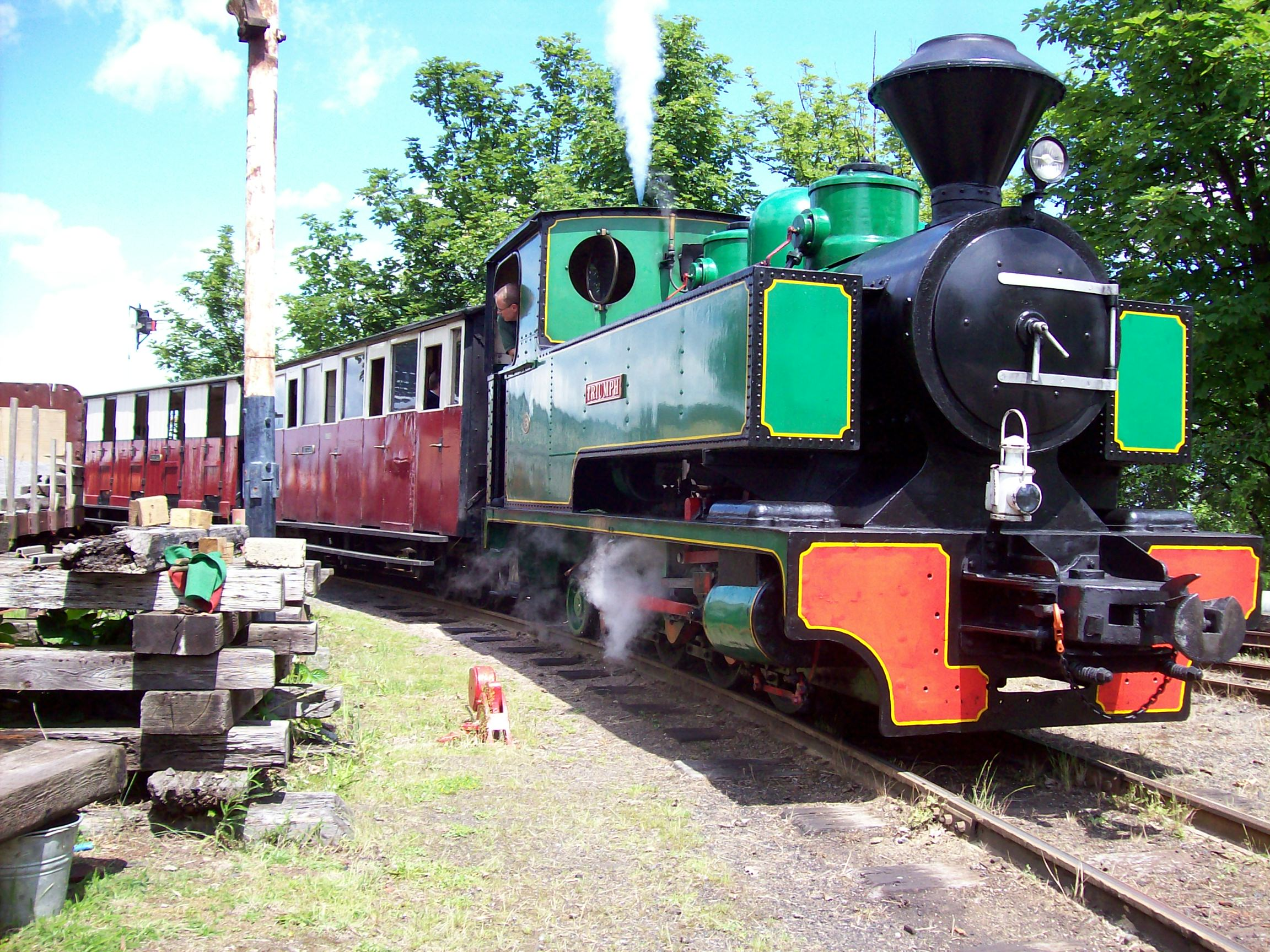
- Triumph arriving at Sittingbourne with a rake of cream and maroon narrow-gauge passenger coaches
- Locale: England
- Terminus: Sittingbourne

Commercial operations
- Name: Bowaters Paper Railway
- Built by: Edward Lloyd Ltd.
- Original gauge: 2 ft 6 in (762 mm)

Preserved operations
- Operated by: Locomotive Club of Great Britain (1969-72); Sittingbourne & Kemsley Light Railway (1972 onwards)
- Stations: 3
- Length: 2 miles (3.2 km)
- Preserved gauge: 2 ft 6 in (762 mm)

Commercial history
- Opened: 1908
- Closed: 1969

Preservation history
- 1970: Opening of Sittingbourne & Kemsley Light Railway
- 2008: Forced closure to the public
- 2010: Partial reopening to the public for 40th anniversary
- 2011: Partial reopening to the public for summer season
- 2012: Full reopening to the public

The Sittingbourne and Kemsley Light Railway in Kent is a 2 ft 6 in (762 mm) narrow gauge heritage railway that operates from Sittingbourne to the banks of The Swale.

The line was developed as an industrial railway by paper maker Frank Lloyd in 1904, to transport pulp materials and finished products between Ridham Dock, on the Swale, and the company's paper mill at Sittingbourne, and from the mid-1920s to a second mill at Kemsley.

In the late 1960s, the railway faced closure by its then owners Bowater, but the Locomotive Club of Great Britain accepted an offer to operate the railway from 1970. However, the section of line from Kemsley Down to Ridham Dock was abandoned for redevelopment of the paper mills.

In 2008–09, the line survived a threat of closure due to the owners of Sittingbourne Paper Mill closing the mill and selling the land. The lease then held by the railway expired in January 2009, but negotiations resulted in the railway being saved, although no public trains ran in 2009.

In September 2010, press reports announced the possibility that the railway would operate an anniversary service - over a short section between Kemsley Down Station and the Milton Regis Halt - to celebrate 40 years of operation. The service carried more than 700 passengers over several days during October.

In 2011, the railway reopened in late May and operated until the end of September. During this time, Milton Regis Viaduct's deferred maintenance, from winter 2008, was carried out and Essential Land's contractors completed the removal of pipelines around Sittingbourne Viaduct station. The last train of the season ran over Milton Regis Viaduct to the gate at Sittingbourne Viaduct station - the first public train to cross the Viaduct since 26 December 2008.

2012 saw the railway return to Sittingbourne Viaduct when it reopened on Sunday 27 May. (See "Reopening" section below.)

== History ==
In 1905, the horse-drawn tramway operating around the paper mill was upgraded to steam operation with the purchase of two steam locomotives, "Premier" and "Leader", which were still there for the centenary celebrations in 2005. Other locomotives were bought for use on the railway as the network expanded.

In the 1960s, a time-and-motion study was undertaken by the owners, Bowaters UK, and the railway was deemed to be more expensive than road transport and was closed. However, Bowaters UK offered the main line, some of the locos and rolling stock of the railway to the Locomotive Club of Great Britain for preservation as a tourist railway. Other locomotives and rolling stock were sold to the Great Whipsnade Railway and the Welshpool and Llanfair Light Railway. The SKLR is now the longest continuous operator of the railway.

In January 2007, M-real closed Sittingbourne Paper Mill. However, Church Marshes Country Park now has a managing committee and will see the surrounding area between Milton Regis Halt and Kemsley Down being turned into a fully-fledged country park.

== Preservation ==
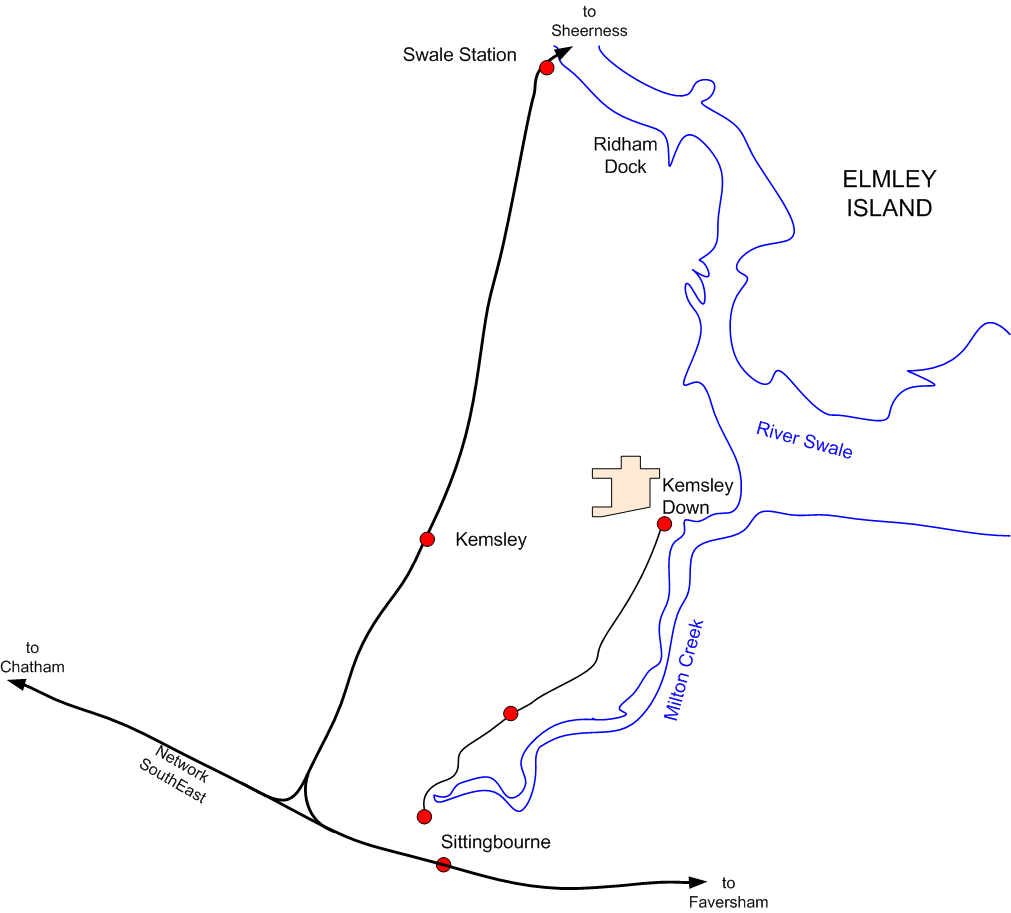
Map of the Sittingbourne & Kemsley Light Railway

The railway is now operated by the Sittingbourne & Kemsley Light Railway and operates over almost 2 miles (3.2 km) of the original main line from Sittingbourne Viaduct station to Kemsley Down station. It crosses one of the first and longest reinforced concrete viaducts in the world between Sittingbourne Viaduct and Milton Regis Halt stations.

The main fleet of locomotives worked the railway before it was preserved. "Barton Hall" was the first new arrival on the railway in over 25 years on long-term loan and was eventually purchased by the railway to assist with railway operations.

In 2005, the railway had its first ever visit of a steam loco: 'Chevallier' returned to the railway after being sold to a new owner. It arrived at the railway on a low loader days before the centenary celebrations and stayed on site until early 2006, when it was taken away for restoration. 'Chevallier' was originally built for the Admiralty's Chattenden & Upnor Railway before being sold to Bowaters for use on the Paper Railway, and later moved to the Great Whipsnade Railway. Excelsior, Conqueror and Superior also moved to the Great Whipsnade Railway when it officially opened in 1970.

The railway was closed to the public for the 2009 season.

== Closure threat ==
It was announced on the Meridian Television local news on 22 August 2008 that the railway was expected to close at the end of the year. The last public train was scheduled to depart Sittingbourne Viaduct at 14:00 on 26 December 2008, although the operating company were hoping that negotiations to keep the railway open into the future might be successful.

The railway attempted to buy the land it occupies. A bid of £1 was submitted in view of the high cost of removing asbestos-covered pipes alongside the line. The bid was rejected by M-real. English Heritage is considering whether or not to list the 118-span Milton Regis Viaduct. As well as the railway, the future of three feral cats that live under the café at Kemsley was also threatened. It was announced at the National Railway Museum on 4 September 2008 that the railway had won the 2008 Small Group award from the Heritage Railway Association.

The Heritage Railway Association supported a bid to secure the railway, overseen by Julian Birley of the North Norfolk Railway. Swale Borough Council were also reported as backing the scheme. At a full meeting of Swale Borough Council on 17 September, General Manager Tony James's speech resulted in the council unanimously voting to support the railway in its fight to survive. Mr James credited the Heritage Railway Association with influencing the decision of the council by their actions in giving the award. On 21 September, the railway was visited by Baron Faulkner, chairman of the Railway Heritage Committee, a statutory body which oversees the preservation of railway artefacts in the United Kingdom. Lord Faulkner asked that the railway write to the Secretary of State for Transport in a bid for powers to gain a Compulsory Purchase Order which will enable the railway to buy the trackbed.

The line's "Farewell Gala" on 27–28 September was declared a massive success, with the timetable being abandoned after the first train on the Saturday and altogether on the Sunday. Around 600 passengers were carried each day. After pressure from local MP Derek Wyatt, a meeting was held on 7 October between the railway and M-real about the future of the railway. A screening of the film The Titfield Thunderbolt took place at Sittingbourne on 16 November to raise money for the fighting fund.

In November 2008, the railway was contracted to remove asbestos pipes from a 200 yards (183 m) section alongside the railway. On 12 November, Triumph was used to haul the train, just days before its boiler certificate expired.

It was revealed that the Government had been asked to use international diplomacy in the campaign to prevent closure. Lord Faulkner wrote to Lord Adonis asking for intervention at inter-Government level with the Finnish Government in an attempt to influence the decisions of Metsäliitto Group, who own M-real, to resolve the situation. At a meeting of Swale Borough Council on 12 November, representatives of M-real and their land agents refused to alter their position over the line. The preferred bidder for the land which the line occupies was to be announced on 18 December.

In November 2008, the railway carried commercial freight again. Some of the pipework that ran alongside the line was dismantled, and removed to Kemsley Down by rail as there was no road access. Triumph provided the motive power on 12 November as a one-off. The "last train" ran on 26 December, hauled by Triumph on her last day in service before her boiler certificate expired. It was driven by Keith Twyman, who had driven the first train when the SKLR opened. A power cut at Kemsley Down meant that some of the railway's staff were unable to access the railway, so an empty stock working was run to Sittingbourne to collect them. After the final public service had run, a members special was run. Although there had been no response from M-Real, the railway was planning a week of engineering work in mid-January and also to continue the restoration of Superb. It was reported that the railway was planning to run trains on the line even after the lease expired on 29 January. Swale Borough Council's portfolio holder for regeneration was authorised to continue negotiations with M-Real with a view to retaining the whole of the railway on its present site. It was reported that M-Real had offered to sell a one-half-mile (800 m) length of the line to the council, who could then lease it to SKLR. This was dismissed by the railway as being impracticable as there was no road access to the stretch of line.

Reports that the railway would continue to run after its lease had expired were dismissed as speculation as negotiations between SKLR, Swale Borough Council, developers and M-Real continued. It was announced on 24 March 2009 that negotiations had been concluded between SKLR and M-Real. A press release stated:-

M-real closed down its papermaking operations in Sittingbourne at the beginning of 2007. After seeing to the removal of the papermaking machinery and dealing with the employment, pension and environmental issues at the site, M-real plans to sell all the land associated with the operations.

Sittingbourne & Kemsley Light Railway (SKLR) was therefore given 12 months notice that its arrangements with M-real would come to an end and SKLR would have to cease operating on M-real's land at the end of January 2009.

Since the announcement of the mill closure at the end of 2006 and the notice from M-real at the start of 2008, SKLR has been actively investigating possible ways of securing the future of the light railway and has run a successful campaign highlighting its significance for the town of Sittingbourne and seeking support for its continued operation.

Both M-real and SKLR are pleased to announce that they have been able to agree an interim solution which will allow SKLR's operation to continue as a key part of the development of tourist and leisure activities at Sittingbourne.

The agreement will allow SKLR to provide train services in the future within the Swale Country Park.

As part of the agreement, M-real has donated tracks, sleepers and materials to SKLR in addition to its previous donations of rolling stock.

With the support of Swale Borough Council and specialist professional advisers, SKLR is working on a new business plan for future operations and is grateful for the input and support received from all interested parties. SKLR has decided to suspend its passenger operations for 2009 in order to have time to focus on a number of very important issues which are involved in securing the future of this heritage attraction.

SKLR is also grateful to M-real for a cash donation made by M-real to assist SKLR with its expenses during this period of reduced income.

Both parties would like to express their gratitude to the Officers and Members of Swale Borough Council for their assistance in bringing this agreement about and to Mr Wyatt for his support. Support from Cllr Bowles, Cllr Wright, Ms Barbara Thompson and Mr Ian Lewis has been particularly valuable in bringing the parties together to reach this agreement.

It is hoped that SKLR will now be able to obtain grant funding to help to secure its long-term future, providing a steam railway for the benefit of the people of Swale and beyond for many years to come and allowing the continuing development of Sittingbourne as a major town in the South East.

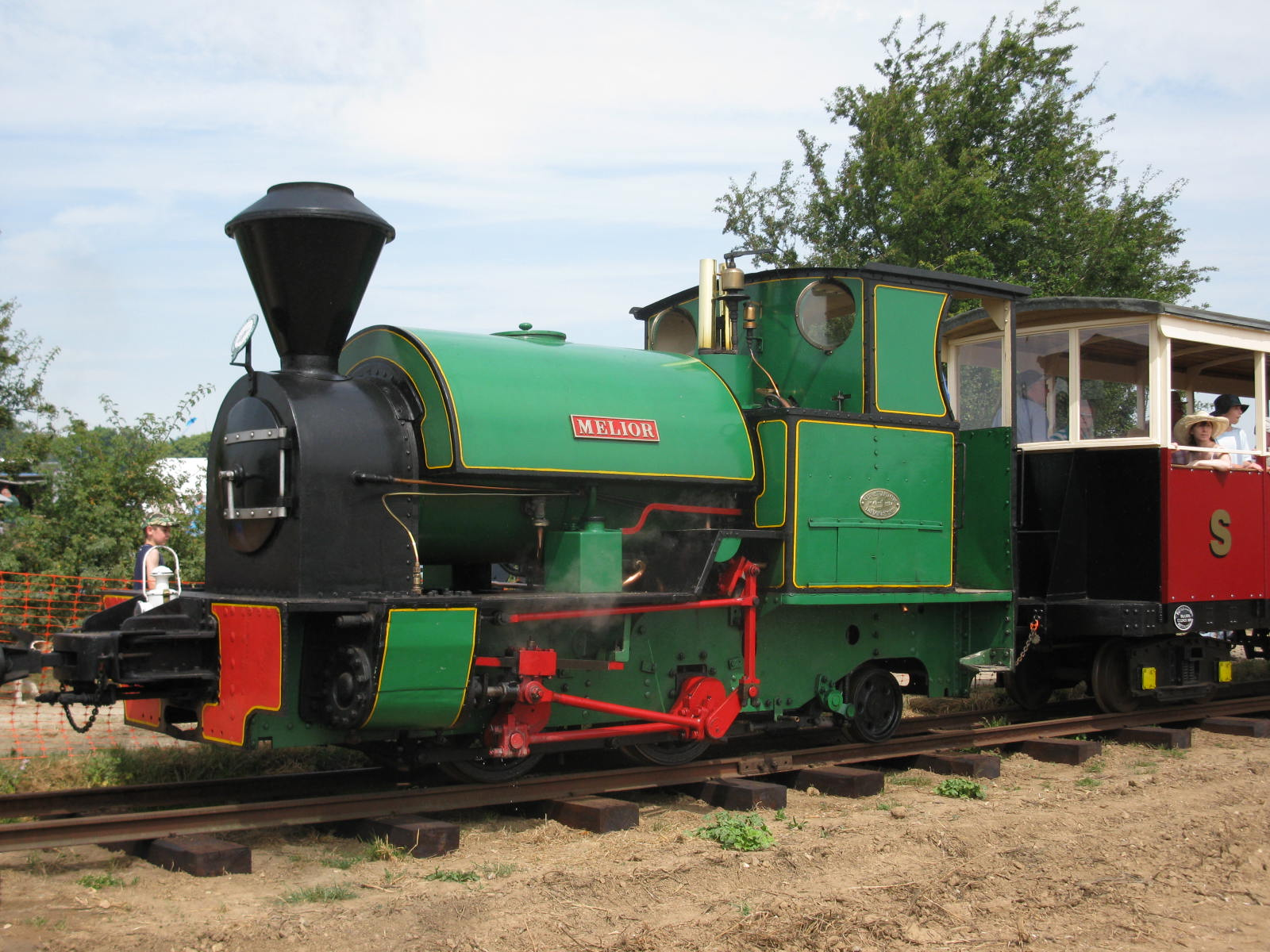
Melior at Preston, June 2009

The freehold of Kemsley Down station is held by D F Smith Ltd, owner of St Regis Paper. The viaduct and Sittingbourne station are part of the estate which D F Smith Ltd are purchasing from M-Real and the SKLR need to negotiate future use of these sites. The railway announced that no public trains will run for the 2009 season, although Melior appeared at a steam rally at Preston-next-Wingham, Kent on 27 and 28 June, running on temporary track. Melior was also in action at Preston-next-Wingham on 1 January 2010.

In January 2010, it was reported that the railway was operating security trains over the line for M-Real in a bid to deter thieves from stealing metal for scrap. Three travellers received burns when they tried to steal live electricity cables from the viaduct at Milton Regis. The large pipeline which carries water at high pressure between Sittingbourne and Kemsley mills had also been damaged in an attempted theft.

Landlord D S Smith, owners of the Kemsley site have agreed to allow the SKLR to retain use of the site. As of January 2010, the station at Sittingbourne and the viaduct had not found a buyer. At the start of September 2010, it was announced that the Railway would briefly reopen in October, running a series of passenger train specials on 24, 27, 30 and 31 October 2010. A number of volunteer work days were organised to prepare the line for these specials, and over 700 passengers were carried between Milton Regis and Kemsley Down. The line then closed again for ongoing maintenance, mainly to the viaduct, with the intention of reopening a full service between Sittingbourne Viaduct and Kemsley Down stations from 2012 onwards.

== Reopening ==
The Sittingbourne & Kemsley Light Railway was originally planned to reopen on Good Friday 2012 but discovery of asbestos at the lineside caused a postponement to Sunday 27 May when the line between Sittingbourne Viaduct and Kemsley Down stations was finally reopened. The first train was hauled by Leader which carried about 200 passengers. The season ran until the last weekend in September. The reopening was branded as Return to Sittingbourne Viaduct and Back in Town.

Steam locomotives Leader returned to service in April and Superb in July respectively to ease the workload on Melior.

The Railway celebrated its Golden Anniversary of Handover in September/October 2019 and the 50th anniversary of public trains in 2020. 2022 is the 50th Anniversary of the Sittingbourne & Kemsley Light Railway as a separate entity.

== Milton Regis Viaduct ==
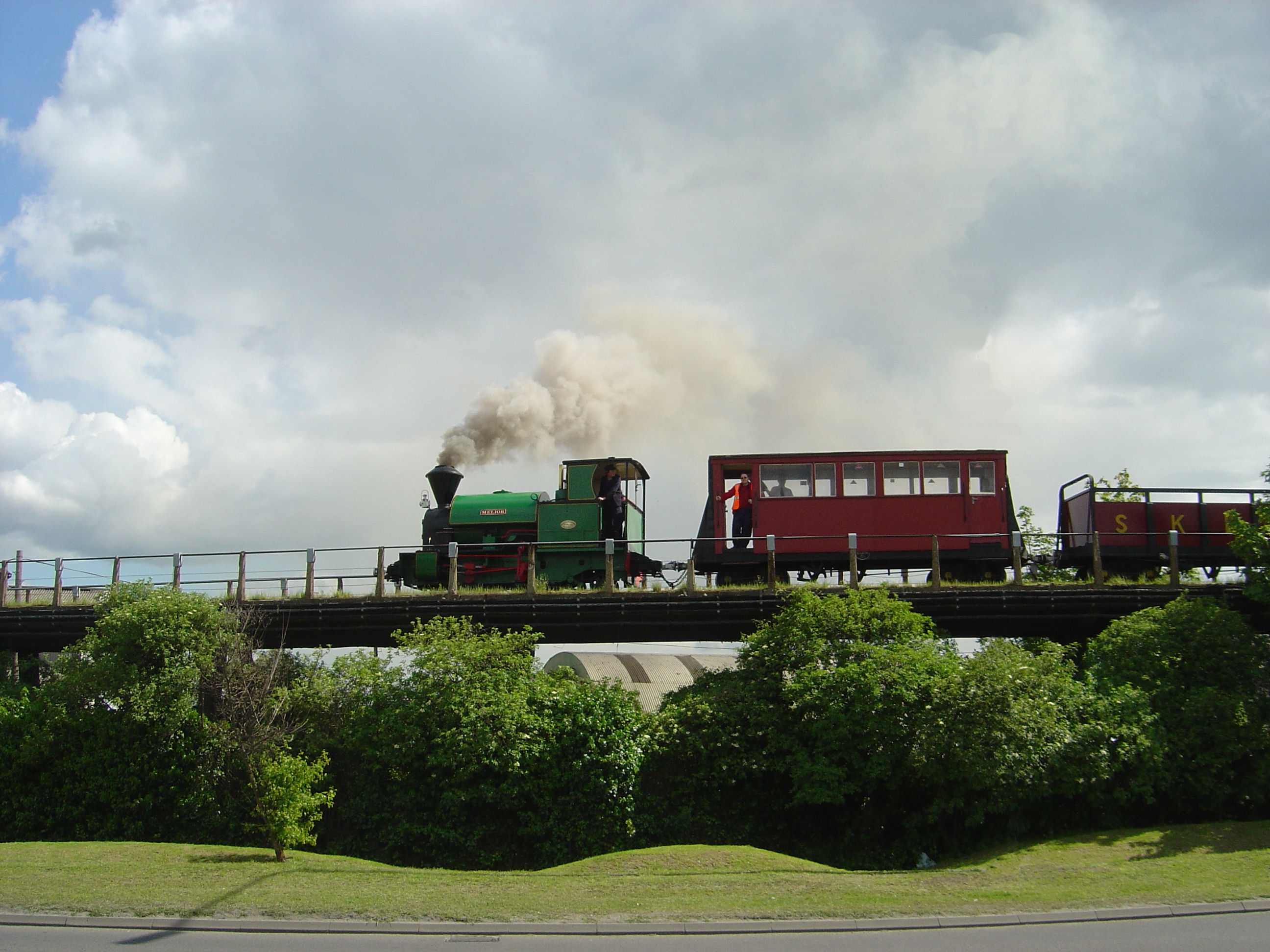
Melior passing over Milton Regis Viaduct bound for Kemsley Down

Milton Regis Viaduct carries the line between Sittingbourne Viaduct station and Milton Regis (Asda) Halt, it is 2,895 feet (882 metres) long and consists of 118 spans and six bridges (crossing The Wall, Flushing Street, Milton Creek, Kings Street, Gas Road and Cook's Lane). It was constructed in 1914-15 out of reinforced concrete by Trollope & Colls Ltd with engineers Rendel, Palmer & Tritton. Believed to be the longest concrete viaduct in the UK. Its initial cost was £10,615 (equivalent to £736,406 in 2019) and has cost the Sittingbourne & Kemsley Light Railway £105,000 (to date) to repair and maintain - funded from the railway's revenues, as the railway receives no external funding. During the winter of 2016/17, extensive additional repairs were carried out to Skew/Gas Road Bridge due to damage caused by over-height vehicles striking the bridge during the Gas Road/Cook's Lane lowering project. These repairs cost an unplanned £20k, in addition to the regular £20k maintenance bill on even-numbered years.

== Locomotives ==
Name	Builder	Wheel arrangement	Works Number	Built	Notes	Photograph
Alpha	W. G. Bagnall	0-6-2T	2472	1932	Stored, undergoing cosmetic restoration. Has not been in service since 1969.	
Leader	Kerr Stuart	0-4-2ST	926	1905	Withdrawn in 2022 after boiler ticket expiry. Currently at One:One Collection in Margate since 2024. Previously returned to service in 2012 after a long and extensive overhaul, having last steamed in 1981. Originally numbered 2. Has two whistles, original and Austrian whistle, the latter being fitted in 2014.	
Melior	Kerr Stuart	0-4-2ST	4219	1924	Operational. Steamed in 1993 after a major overhaul, has subsequently had a boiler overhaul in 2012 and motion repair in 2014/2015.	
Premier	Kerr Stuart	0-4-2ST	886	1905	Operational. Returned to service in 2022 after last steaming in 1994. Originally numbered 1. Restored back to original condition and fitted with vacuum brake equipment.	
Superb	W.G. Bagnall	0-6-2T	2624	1940	Under overhaul. Returned to service in 2012 after an overhaul lasting over 7 years. However, it was withdrawn for overhaul in March 2019 needing firebox repairs.	
Triumph	W.G. Bagnall	0-6-2T	2511	1934	On static display at Kemsley Down; slowly being dismantled for assessment so overhaul can commence once Superb has returned to traffic. Hauled the handover train marking the preservation of the railway. Last steamed in 2008 and withdrawn after the expiry of its boiler certificate.	
Unique	W.G. Bagnall	2-4-0F	2216	1924	On static display at Kemsley Down. A rare narrow gauge fireless locomotive.	
Victor	Hudson Hunslet	4wDM	4182	1953	In service. Returned to service in 2018 after maintenance and repairs. This locomotive's name is inherited from a fireless locomotive scrapped in 1967, as the locomotive was previously unnamed in service.	
Edward Lloyd	Ruston & Hornsby	0-4-0DM	435403	1961	Awaiting overhaul. Originally from Nettleton Top iron ore mine, and arrived on the SKLR from the Great Whipsnade Railway in 1972. Appears as Ivor the Engine for the Ivor the Engine event.	
Barton Hall	Hunslet	4wDH	6651	1965	In service, returned to traffic beginning of 2023 after gearbox and engine repairs. Originally from the Royal Naval Armaments Depot at Dean Hill, Wiltshire. Arrived on the SKLR in 2004 from the Welshpool and Llanfair Light Railway, and worked continuously until early 2019. Was briefly fitted with horn from 'The Tank ' (Former locomotive).	
Tank II	Clayton	4wBE		1973	Intended for maintenance and shunting duties. Originally from MOD Shoeburyness, Essex. Arrived on the SKLR in 2026.	
	Hunslet	4wDM	2266	1940	Originally from the Royal Naval Armaments Depots at Trecwn (Wales) and Broughton Moor (Cumbria). Arrived on the SKLR in 2026.	
No 1	Andrew Barclay and Sons	0-4-0F	1876	1925	Static exhibit at Kemsley Down. Standard gauge fireless locomotive, ex Northfleet Paper Mill, retired 1979. This was the last steam locomotive owned and operated by Bowater and subsequently preserved.	

== See also ==
- British narrow gauge railways
