= Martin Ritchie =

British businessman (1917–1993)

James Martin Comrie Ritchie, FCMI, FRSA (29 May 1917 – 3 June 1993) was the chairman and chief executive of Bowater Paper Corporation from 1969 to 1972. At the time Bowater's was the world's largest newsprint producer.

== Early life ==
James Martin Ritchie was educated at Strathallan School in Perthshire, Scotland. In 1934 he joined the family firm, Andrew Ritchie and Son Ltd, based in Glasgow, becoming a director in 1938. The company manufactured corrugated fiber containers. In 1938 he joined the Territorial Army as an officer.

During World War II Ritchie served with a British Army Heavy Anti-Aircraft Regiment and was promoted captain in 1941. In 1943 he passed staff college and from 1944-1945 served as Deputy Assistant Adjutant and Quartermaster General with Middle East Command.

== Career ==
Following the completion of his military service, Ritchie rejoined the family firm, which had become part of the Eburite Organisation, becoming managing director in 1950. In 1956 the business merged with Bowater and was renamed Bowater-Eburite Ltd, with Ritchie as general manager. He was appointed a director of Bowater Paper Corporation Limited in 1959, managing director in 1964, deputy chairman and managing director in 1967 and chairman and chief executive from 1969 until his retirement in 1972.

Ritchie oversaw Bowater's purchase of Ralli International for £80 million in 1972. A deal designed to diversify Bowater's away from the paper trade and into other product areas.

Ritchie also served as chairman of British Enkalon Limited between 1975 and 1983, chairman of Haymills Holdings Limited from 1977 until 1983 and as a director of Sun Alliance and London Insurance Limited from 1970 to 1987.

== Honours ==
- Appointed a Fellow of the Chartered Management Institute in 1971.
- Appointed a Fellow of the Royal Society of Arts in 1971.
