= Sittingbourne =

Town in Kent, England

Coordinates: 51.34°N 0.74°E

- Industrial town
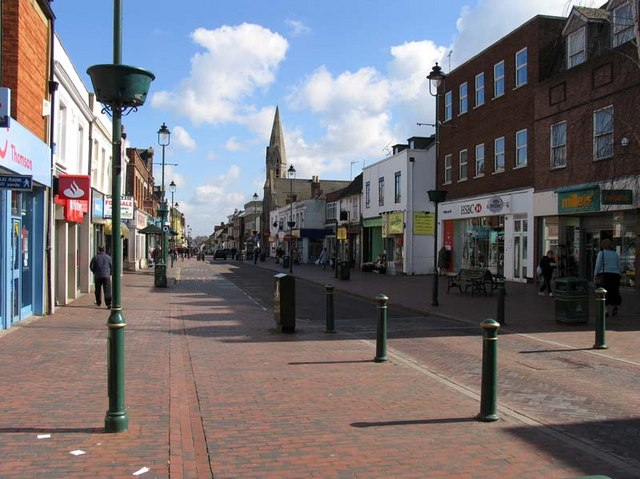
- Sittingbourne High Street

- Location within Kent
- Population: 54,392 (2021 Census)
- OS grid reference: TQ905635
- District: Swale
- Shire county: Kent
- Region: South East
- Country: England
- Sovereign state: United Kingdom
- Post town: SITTINGBOURNE
- Postcode district: ME9, ME10
- Dialling code: 01795
- Police: Kent
- Fire: Kent
- Ambulance: South East Coast
- UK Parliament: Sittingbourne and Sheppey

Sittingbourne is an industrial town in the Swale district of Kent, southeast England, 17 miles (27 km) from Canterbury and 45 miles (72 km) from London, beside the Roman Watling Street, an ancient trackway used by the Romans and the Anglo-Saxons. In 2021 it had a population of 54,392.

The town stands next to the Swale, a strip of sea separating mainland Kent from the Isle of Sheppey. The town became prominent after the death of Thomas Becket in 1170, since it provided a convenient resting point on the road from London to Canterbury and Dover.

Chatham Main Line links to London Victoria station and HS1 to St Pancras International, the journey taking about an hour from Sittingbourne railway station.

== History ==
Sittingbourne owes its name to a modernised version of an observation on its location. The town's name came from the fact that there is a small stream or "bourne" running underground in part of the town. Hasted writing in the 1790s in his History of Kent states that:

Sittingbourne was anciently written Sedingbourne, in Saxon, Saedingburga, i.e. the hamlet by the bourne or small stream.

Another explanation is that the name Sittingbourne derives from the Old English sīdeingasburna meaning the 'stream of the dwellers on the slope'.

The Kent Hundred Rolls of 1274–75, preserved in the National Archives, record Sittingbourne as Sydingeburn in the following entries " Item dicunt quod Johannes Maresescall de Synele tenet unam parvam purpresturam in villa de Sydingeburn et solvit domino regi per annum 1d et dominus rex nichil perdit et quod Petrus de London tenet unam parvam purpresturam in villa de Sydingeburn et solvit inde per annum domino regi 1d et rex nichil perdit." Translated as, "Then they say John Marshall de Synele holds one small encroachment in the vill of Sittingbourne and he pays the lord king 1d. each year and the lord king loses nothing and that Peter of London holds one small encroachment in the vill of Sittingbourne and he pays 1d. each year to the lord king and the king loses nothing."

In 1921, the civil parish had a population of 9339. On 31 March 1930 the parish was abolished to form "Sittingbourne and Milton", part also went to Tunstall.

=== Romans ===
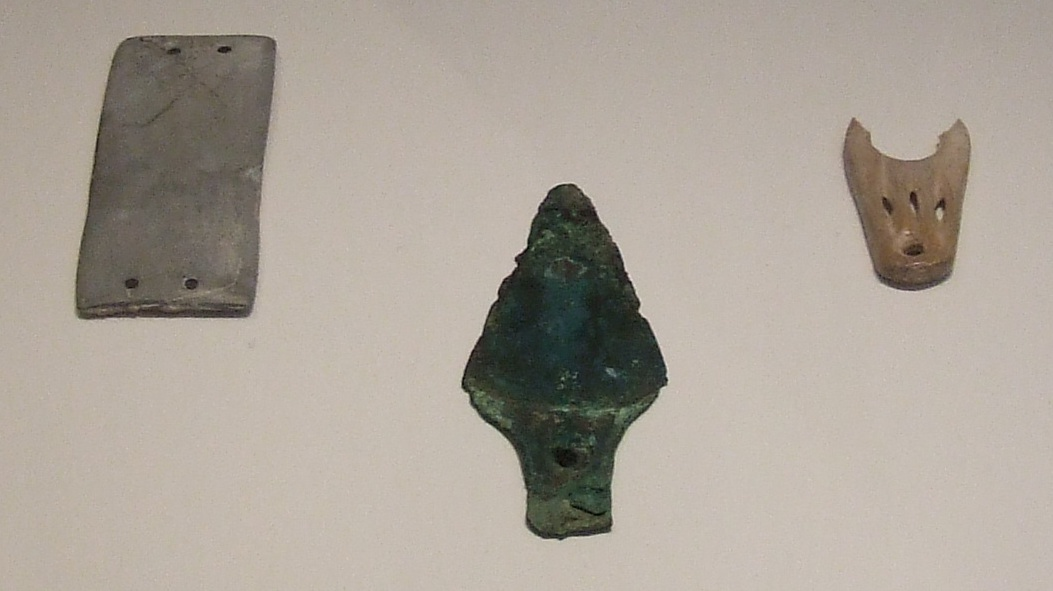
A Copper Age grave group dating from 2500 to 2100 BC, found at Sittingbourne

There is evidence of settlement in the area before 2000 BC, with farming and trading tribes living inland to avoid attack, yet close enough to access the sea at Milton Creek. In AD 43, the Romans invaded Kent, and to make access quicker between London and Dover, built Watling Street, which passed straight through Sittingbourne. As a point where sea access met road access, the port of Milton Regis became the Roman administrative centre for the area, with some 20 villas so far discovered, but Sittingbourne remained a minor hamlet throughout Roman times.

Most Roman finds in this area were due to the efforts of 19th-century brick makers who used topsoil to make bricks, and uncovered the finds; and preserved thanks to banker George Payne, who preserved or bought materials and published his works in 1893 in Collectanea Cantiana.

=== Middle Age Hostelry ===
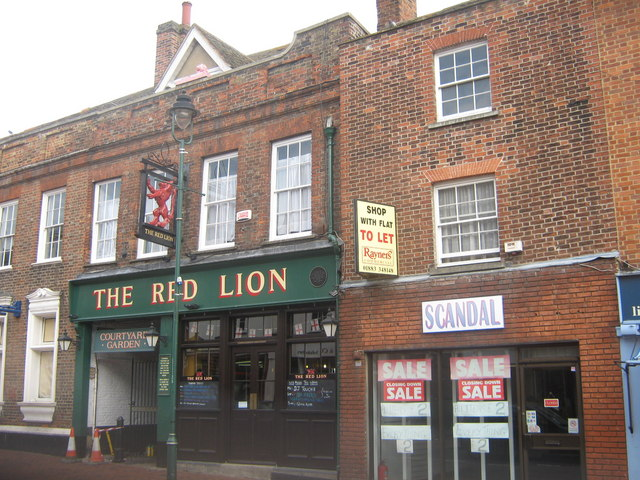
The Red Lion Public House, Sittingbourne

There was no entry for Sittingbourne in the Domesday Book of 1086, merely a note attached to Milton Regis showing a population of 393 households. However, after the murder of the Archbishop of Canterbury, Thomas Becket in 1170, pilgrims began to travel to Canterbury Cathedral and Sittingbourne became a useful hostelry for travellers. Sittingbourne is mentioned as a stopping point in Chaucer's The Canterbury Tales, with the Summoner in "The Wife of Bath's Prologue" saying:

But if I telle tales two or thre / Of freres er I come to Sidyngborne / That I shal make thyn herte for to morne

The parish church of St Michael was built in the 13th century. At that time, the High Street had 13 pubs and hostels. The Lyon – now the Red Lion – hosted King Henry V of England on his way back from the Battle of Agincourt, and Henry VIII visited Sittingbourne in 1522 and 1532. In 1708, the Rose Inn was built, originally called Rose Place and used as a private house. According to Edward Hasted "the principal inn now in it (Sittingbourne), called the Rose, is perhaps the most superb of any throughout the kingdom." In 1825 the future Queen Victoria and her mother, Princess Victoria of Saxe-Coburg-Saalfeld stayed overnight at the Rose Inn.

=== Railway and Industrial Revolution ===
After the railway came in 1858, Sittingbourne became less a market trading and hostelry stop-off, and more a 19th-century centre of production to fuel the expansion of London, by producing bricks and paper from its clay substrata.

=== The First World War ===
The area around Sittingbourne was subject to constant air raids by Zeppelins and aeroplanes during the First World War. The Germans used the town as a reference point for bearings on the way to London.

The first visit by a German aeroplane happened on Christmas Day 1914. Guns at Sheerness fired at the lone invader but still one shell dropped into a field at Iwade. The next event was to occur on 16 January 1915 when another solitary pilot from a German aerodrome in Belgium bombed Sittingbourne. This aircraft, a Taube, was pursued by two local airmen, but managed to escape after dropping a couple of bombs.

About 100 air-raid warnings were sounded in Sittingbourne during the First World War and anti-aircraft batteries were strengthened in 1917. The last big raid to pass over the town on Whit Sunday (19 May 1918), carried out by a number of Gothas, eliciting perhaps the most ferocious barrage from the ground defences the town had ever seen.

The local newspaper, the East Kent Gazette, reported:

"The first of these duels occurred about an hour after the raid had been in progress, and probably this machine was caught while on its way to London. It was engaged by a daring aviation officer while at a great height. The British airman attacked his opponent so fiercely that the German was forced down to a lower height, and ultimately, to the joy of the onlookers, the Gotha burst into flames, seemed to break in two and came down piecemeal, all aflame. The wrecked machine and the three occupants fell by a farm. Two of the Germans fell into marshy ground and their bodies were deeply embedded in the mud. The third man's head struck a wall and was shattered like an eggshell. All three bodies were removed to a local aviation establishment. The fall of the burning Gotha was seen for miles around."

The second Gotha was surrounded by British fighters shortly after, returning from a successful raid on London.

Donald John Dean VC OBE of Sittingbourne was awarded the Victoria Cross for deeds carried out in France in 1918. His ashes are interred in the family plot at St John the Baptist Church, Tunstall, Kent.

As a result of the number of soldiers blinded during the war, the Kent Association for the Blind was formed in Sittingbourne in 1920.

== Economy ==
The local clay was suitable for making bricks, and North Kent is geologically rich in chalk, which is not found in many other places in Europe in such abundance. This led to the development associated industries: water transport, paper, and cement; all of which continue today in the area.

=== Brickmaking ===
In 1870, up to 2,628 men were working in the brick and tile industry, this is compared to Staffordshire (the next largest brick manufacturing area) that had only 1,566 men working in the industry. Brickmaking continued in the town well into the mid twentieth century. The bricks for the 3.45-mile (5,550 m) London Bridge – Greenwich Railway Viaduct were all made at Sittingbourne and transported to the site by barge.

=== Bargebuilding and water transport ===
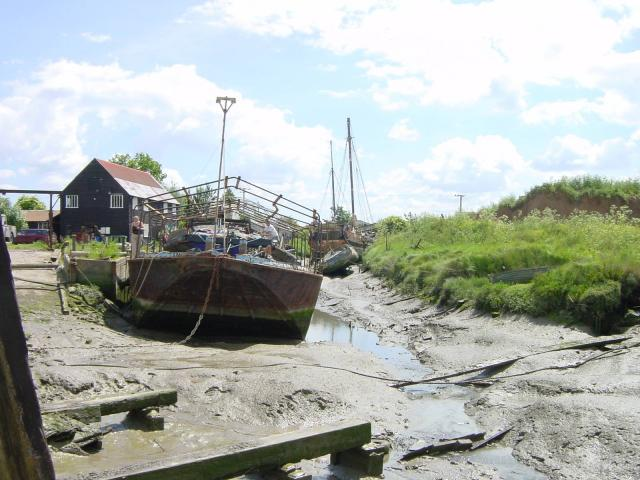
Dolphin Yard Sailing Barge Museum, Sittingbourne. The site includes the original sail loft and forge which have been converted to a museum devoted to the history of the Thames Sailing Barge and the associated industries of brick and cement making which once sustained the local fleet of barges.

Barges were needed to move many other raw materials and finished goods into the Thames and to London and beyond. Sittingbourne was ideally suited for this purpose and a successful barge-building industry developed at Milton Creek.

Sittingbourne developed into a port during the Industrial Revolution, from which Kentish produce was transported to the London markets. During this era over 500 types of barges are believed to have been built, centred around Conyer, a Roman hamlet of the village of Teynham, found at the head of a small creek between Sittingbourne and Faversham.

After World War II, these activities began to fall into a decline, so that only the Burley yard continued with the repair of barges until about 1965. Charles Burley was a brick maker and barge owner who occupied the yard in Crown Quay Lane, which is now occupied by a builders' merchant. This lack of barge repairs led the creek to become silted and derelict. In 1968, the site was owned by Bourncrete Limited, manufacturers of concrete products.

The yard was then leased to the newly established Dolphin Sailing Barge Museum Trust. The inlet alongside the Museum usually contains at least one vessel brought to the yard for restoration, including the famous sailing barge Cambria.

The town's links with water transport survive today, through a bronze statue of a bargeman in the town centre. The Dolphin Sailing Barge Museum was destroyed by arson in 2008. The museum is now awaiting relocation to a new site Plans to move to Whitstable Harbour were refused in 2013.

=== Paper ===
Paper mills and brickfields were fed by barges that brought in sand, mud and household waste such as cinders for brick making, and took away the finished product on the return journey.

Paper manufacture started in Sittingbourne in 1708, when Peter Archer was recorded as a Paper Maker. Sittingbourne Mill existed from circa 1769, which by 1820 had grown and was owned by Edward Smith. The Daily Chronicle owner Edward Lloyd bought the site in 1863. Using pulped straw from the local farmers and esparto (imported from Algeria and Southern Spain) as a replacement for expensive cotton rag which was becoming more expensive; the output supplied newsprint for his mills in Bow.

To speed production, in 1904 Lloyd's son built a wharf on the tidal inlet at Milton Creek in 1904;a horse-drawn tramway to carry materials to the mill was also built. On what is now known as the Sittingbourne & Kemsley Light Railway, in 1906 the first of three steam locomotives, Premier, came into service, all 0-4-2 Brazil type tank engines sourced from Kerr Stuart. In 1913 the railway was extended to the new dock built at Ridham. In 1912, Sittingbourne Paper Mill was the largest producer of newsprint in the world, with its 1,200 employees using 17 machines to make over 2000 tonnes per week, supplying the demands of Fleet Street.

In 1924, Lloyd's son built a new factory at Kemsley, together with a model village for employees. He died in 1936, when the Lloyd group was taken over by Sir William Berry, who in 1936 formed the Bowater-Lloyd Group. After both plants were acquired by Metsa Serla in 1998, the decision was made to close the Sittingbourne Mill in October 2006, with the last reel produced on 23 January 2007.

== Education ==
Sittingbourne and the surrounding area have a number of primary schools. The main secondary schools in the town are Fulston Manor School, The Sittingbourne School, The Westlands School and two single sex Grammar Schools, Borden Grammar School (Boys) and Highsted Grammar School (Girls). Pupils wishing to apply for a year 7 place at grammar school have to take the Kent Test (11+) to assess if grammar school is a suitable option for them.

Sittingbourne Adult Education Centre provides some post-16 and adult training in the town and there is an Adult Skills centre located in the town centre. In May 2015 a post-16 technical college opened in the town.

== Transport ==
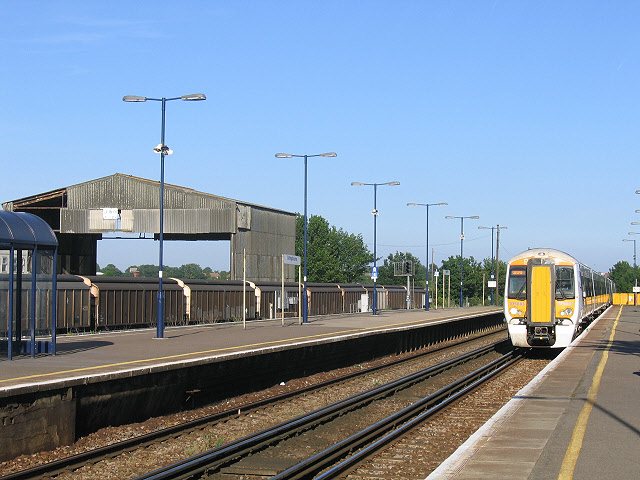
A British Rail Class 375 unit at Sittingbourne railway station.

The town is served by Sittingbourne railway station which is located approximately 44 miles from London Victoria and located on the Chatham Main Line, close to the junction where it meets the Sheerness Line. Opened by the London, Chatham and Dover Railway in 1858, the station is now managed by Southeastern who operate all services. The station is served by regular mainline and high speed services to London Victoria, London St Pancras International (via High Speed 1), The Medway Towns, Canterbury, Dover and Ramsgate as well as by an hourly shuttle service to Sheerness-on-Sea.

Most bus services in Sittingbourne are provided by Chalkwell Coaches who operate services 326, 327, 347 and 349 to Chatham, Gillingham, Rainham, Upchurch, Newington, Kemsley and Murston. Sittingbourne is also served by the Arriva Southern Counties route 334 to Maidstone, Iwade, Minster and Sheerness and by the Stagecoach South East route X3 to Maidstone, Teynham, Faversham and Canterbury. The towns bus services all serve Sittingbourne Bus Hub which opened in 2019.

Sittingbourne is geographically located midway between the major port of Dover and London. The first significant transport connection to the town was the Roman construction of Watling Street, now the A2 main road. The M2 motorway bypasses the town to the south. The A249 passes the town on the west, heading between Maidstone and Sheerness.

=== Sittingbourne and Kemsley Light Railway ===
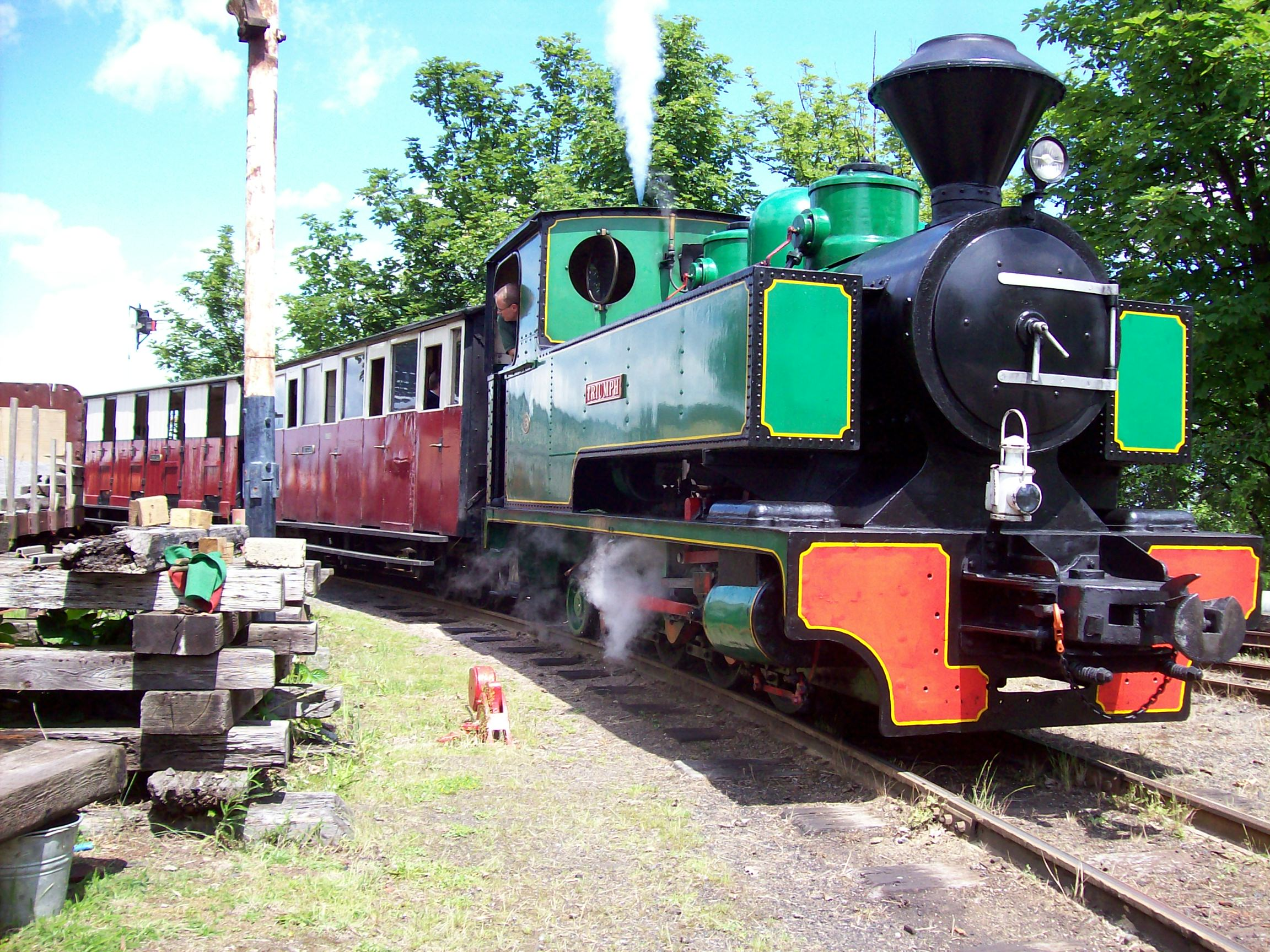
Triumph arriving with a train on the Sittingbourne and Kemsley Light Railway

The preserved former paper mill railway the Sittingbourne and Kemsley Light Railway still exists today. In 1965 it was decided that the railway was uneconomic, so lorries were more commonly used for transporting produce. Consequently, by 1969 the Bowater Light Railway, much loved as it was by the firm (and with assistance of Capt Peter Manisty) was handed over to the Locomotive Club of Great Britain to be preserved and operated as the Sittingbourne and Kemsley Light Railway.

It has since become a significant feature in the town's tourist industry, and provides the only method of transport to the annual Sittingbourne Beer Festival. However, it has been under threat of closure since 2008 when M-real sold the site to a property developer.

== Media ==
=== Television ===
Local television news programmes are provided by BBC South East and ITV Meridian, broadcast from the Bluebell Hill transmitting station near Chatham.

=== Radio ===
The local radio station for Sittingbourne is 106.9 SFM – who provide a full local radio service and have been broadcasting since Thursday 26 July 2012.

=== Newspaper ===
The local newspaper is called KM Sittingbourne Messenger and the mid-week edition KM Sittingbourne News Extra, published by the KM Group. In December 2011, the East Kent Gazette, the town's other local newspaper, closed down with the loss of 39 jobs, having been the town's local news outlet since 1856.

== Notable people ==
- Wilfred Andrews (1892–1975), RAC Chairman
- Shane Byrne, six times British Superbike Champion.
- Ben Dover (Simon James Honey), Pornographic actor, director, and producer
- Eileen Greenwood (1915–2008), principal of Sittingbourne College of Education
- Thomas Lushington, theologian
- Roger Moate (1938–2019), Conservative politician
- Dave Whitcombe, former darts player
- Chloe Petts, comedian

== Sport ==
The town has one senior football team, Sittingbourne F.C. (nicknamed "The Brickies"). Sittingbourne F.C. currently play their games at Woodstock Park, part of the Kent Science Park complex. The club play in the Isthmian League Division One South.

The town has two hockey clubs: Sittingbourne Hockey Club based in the heart of town at Borden Grammar School. and Gore Court Hockey Club, who play at Westlands School and share the clubhouse at Gore Court.

Motorcycle speedway racing has been staged near Sittingbourne for a number of years. The track was originally used for training alone but since 1994 the Sittingbourne Crusaders took part in the Conference League and other competitions. The track remains today as a popular speedway training facility open to riders across the country.

Sittingbourne is also home to Bayford Meadow's Kart Circuit. The 1100m MSA licensed circuit and the 300m leisure circuit are set within a 12-acre landscaped site.

Sittingbourne Rugby Club was established in 1976. SRUFC run three regular men's senior teams. The 1XV are currently competing in Counties 2 Kent (Level 8).

== Twin towns ==
- Ypres, Belgium (Since 1964)

== See also ==
- Listed buildings in Sittingbourne
