= Metsä Board =

Finnish forestry industry business; part of Metsä Group

Metsä Board Oyj
- Company type: Julkinen osakeyhtiö
- Traded as: Nasdaq Helsinki: METSA, METSB
- Industry: Paper and packaging
- Predecessor: G.A. Serlachius Oy
- Founded: December 1986; 39 years ago
- Headquarters: Espoo, Finland
- Key people: Ilkka Hämälä (Chairman); Mika Joukio (President and CEO); Jussi Noponen (CFO)
- Products: s, pulp and consumer packaging
- Revenue: ▼€1.932 billion (2019)
- Operating income: ▼€184 million (2019)
- Net income: ▼€145 million (2019)
- Number of employees: 2,351 (end 2019)
- Website: www.metsaboard.com

Metsä Board Oyj, previously known as M-real Corporation, is a Finnish producer of fresh fibre paperboards including folding boxboards, food service boards and white kraftliners. It was originally established by G.A. Serlachius, and named Metsä-Serla (Forest Serla). Metsä Board is part of Metsä Group, one of the largest forest industry groups in the world.

On 29 September 2008, M-Real sold four of its paper mills to South African company, Sappi.

Nowadays, Metsä Board focuses on folding boxboards, food service boards and white kraftliners. Metsä Board has altogether seven production units in Finland (Kyro, Tako, Simpele, Äänekoski, Kemi, Joutseno, Kaskinen) and one in Sweden (Husum).

In autumn 2020, Metsä Board announced that it would open a competence center in Äänekoski focusing on cardboard and packaging. In the same factory area were housed, among others, Metsä Group's bioproduct factory, cardboard factory, birch veneer factory, wood-based textile fiber test factory and a test factory producing 3D fiber products, which started to operate in May 2022.
