= Rexam =

Former British multinational corporation

Rexam plc
- Type: Public
- Industry: Packaging
- Founded: 1881; 145 years ago (London)
- Defunct: June 2016
- Fate: Acquired by Ball Corporation
- Headquarters: London, England, UK
- Key people: Stuart Chambers (Chairman); Graham Chipchase (CEO)
- Products: Beverage cans, plastic packaging
- Revenue: £3,925 million (2015)
- Operating income: £291 million (2015)
- Net income: £185 million (2015)
- Number of employees: 8,000 (2014)
- Website: www.rexam.com

Rexam plc was a British-based multinational consumer packaging company headquartered in London, England. After spending much of its life as a paper producer known as Bowater, it diversified and became a leading manufacturer of beverage cans. It had 55 plants in over 20 countries across Asia, Europe, North America and South America. In June 2016, Rexam was acquired by Ball Corporation for $8.4 billion.

== History ==
=== Foundation ===
Manchester-born William Vansittart Bowater trained as a manager with James Wrigley and Sons, a paper making business based in Manchester. Having been dismissed in 1881 at age 43, Bowater decided to establish himself as a paper agent in London.

In a quickly expanding market, Bowater later secured contracts to supply newsprint to two of the leading publishing entrepreneurs: Alfred Harmsworth, then publisher of the Daily Mail and the Daily Mirror; and Edward Lloyd, publisher of the Daily Chronicle. The company was subsequently renamed W.V. Bowater and Sons after three of Bowater's sons joined the business, but as an agent the business had few staff: Bowater and his three sons as partner; six clerks; two typists; and an office boy.

After Bowater's death in 1907, in 1910, the company became a private limited liability company, led by Thomas Vansittart Bowater. It expanded into large-scale dealing in waste paper, including the export of surplus newspapers to the Far East to enable their protection during shipping of tea plants. But after Thomas became Lord Mayor of London in 1913, the company was left to be run by his younger brothers, who expanded the business internationally. They established an office in Sydney to export newsprint to Australia, and the Hudson Packaging and Paper Company to market UK newsprint in the United States.

=== 1920s ===
The start of the First World War brought about huge growth in the paper market, and the company was prepared for this having purchased a site for development as a pulp and paper making mill in Northfleet, on the south side of the Thames estuary near Gravesend. However, with restrictions on both raw materials and production imposed by the Ministry of War, construction was not started by contractor Armstrong Whitworth until post the end of the war. After the need to redesign the plant proposed by Armstrong Whitworth, eldest grandson Eric Bowater was put in charge of the project to select new secondary contractors. After he established full production from the plant in July 1925, in 1927 at the age of 32, he became chairman and managing director of W.V. Bowater and Sons.

In 1928, Eric sold stakes in the business to both Lord Rothermere and other investors, reducing the families stake to 40%. The resulting cash injection allowed a doubling of expansion at Northfleet through additional investment. In 1929, he agreed a deal with both Lord Rothermere and Beaverbrook Newspapers to establish a new pulp and paper mill beside the Manchester Ship Canal in Ellesmere Port, Cheshire, the product from which would be consumed under long term supply deals to the newspapers of the two investors. Resultantly, by the end of 1930 with both plants online at full production, Bowater's mills output was 175,000 tons of newsprint per annum, 22% of the UK's total newsprint output.

=== 1930s ===
However, the great depression cut badly into both investors businesses, resulting in a desperate need for cash injections. After Rothermere sold his stakes in both the main company and the Mersey mill, Beaverbrook took the same action, resulting the company being again completely in family control. As newspaper circulation rose again, Eric invested to double the capacity of the Mersey mills.

After the death of Edward Lloyd, in 1936 the company bought both the Sittingbourne and relatively new Kemsley Paper Mill. This brought the company's output to 500,000 tons per annum across four plants, producing 60% of British newsprint and the largest newsprint maker in Europe.

After a Scandinavian-cartel engineered a large rise in pulp prices, Eric started to buy into raw pulp production. After buying forest interests in both Sweden and Norway, he bought a large pulp and paper mill at Corner Brook, Newfoundland in 1938, which owned 7,000 square miles (18,000 km^{2}) of timber and produced 200,000 tons per year of paper. This brought the companies newsprint output up to 800,000 tons per annum.

=== Second World War ===
At the outbreak of the Second World War, the British government restricted the import and consumption of wood and other products used to create pulp, resulting in an 80% reducing in the companies pre-War UK output. Resultantly, the Northfleet plant which was closest to occupied Europe was closed down. From 1940, Eric Bowater himself was seconded by William Morris to join his team at Ministry of Aircraft Production, for which he was knighted in 1944.

=== Post War ===
After he returned to the business in 1945, Sir Eric Bowater focused the business on packaging in the UK, and international expansion. After buying Acme Corrugated Cases Ltd in 1944, Bowater began to organise the companies interests into a series of wholly owned subsidiaries. As a result, by the mid-1950s, Bowater was the largest producer of newsprint in the world. The Company diversified into tissue manufacturing in 1956 forming Bowater-Scott, a joint venture with the Scott Corporation; Scott Corporation bought out the Bowater interest in the joint venture in 1986. Bowater opened a new factory in Gillingham, Kent in the 1960s.

By 1962, company assets totalled close to £200 million. Consuming huge amounts of capital, the company had failed to invest in its newsprint production, leaving it with a high cost base which was added to by the opening of Bowater House, a new head office in Knightsbridge. After the death of Sir Eric in 1962, the company began to consolidate. The money-losing European assets were slowly sold off, until the last French plant was sold in the early 1970s. UK and North American newsprint was unwound, with the loss of 300,000 tons of annual production and the closure of the Northfleet mill.

The company demerged its existing United States subsidiary, Bowater Inc., in 1984. However three years later, in 1987, the company acquired Rexham Corporation, a manufacturer of plastic, paper and foil, based in North Carolina.

In 1992, the company acquired Dickinson Robinson Group Packaging. In 1995, the name was changed to Rexam, an abbreviation of the name of one of the Company's subsidiaries, Riegel Paper America, and the business was refocused again – this time into consumer packaging.

In 2005, Rexam disposed of its glass manufacturing businesses to Ardagh Glass Group so as to concentrate on its beverage can production worldwide. It then went on to acquire O–I Plastics, a plastic packaging business in North America, in 2007. In June 2011, Rexam agreed to sell its lid-making operations to the U.S.-based Berry Plastics for £222 million (US$360 million).

On 13 February 2014, Rexam acquired 51% stake in United Arab Can Manufacturing Ltd for $122 million.

In February 2015, Rexam accepted Ball Corporation's sweetened takeover offer of £4.4 billion ($6.7 billion), a deal which created one of the world's biggest consumer-packaging suppliers. Ball was required to sell eight U.S. aluminum can plants. In June 2016, Rexam was acquired by Ball Corporation for $8.4 billion.

== Operations ==
Rexam had around 55 plants in over 20 countries and employed around 8,000 people. Its operations span Europe, the Americas and Asia.
