= Kerr, Stuart and Company =

British locomotive manufacturer, 1881–1930

Kerr, Stuart & Co.
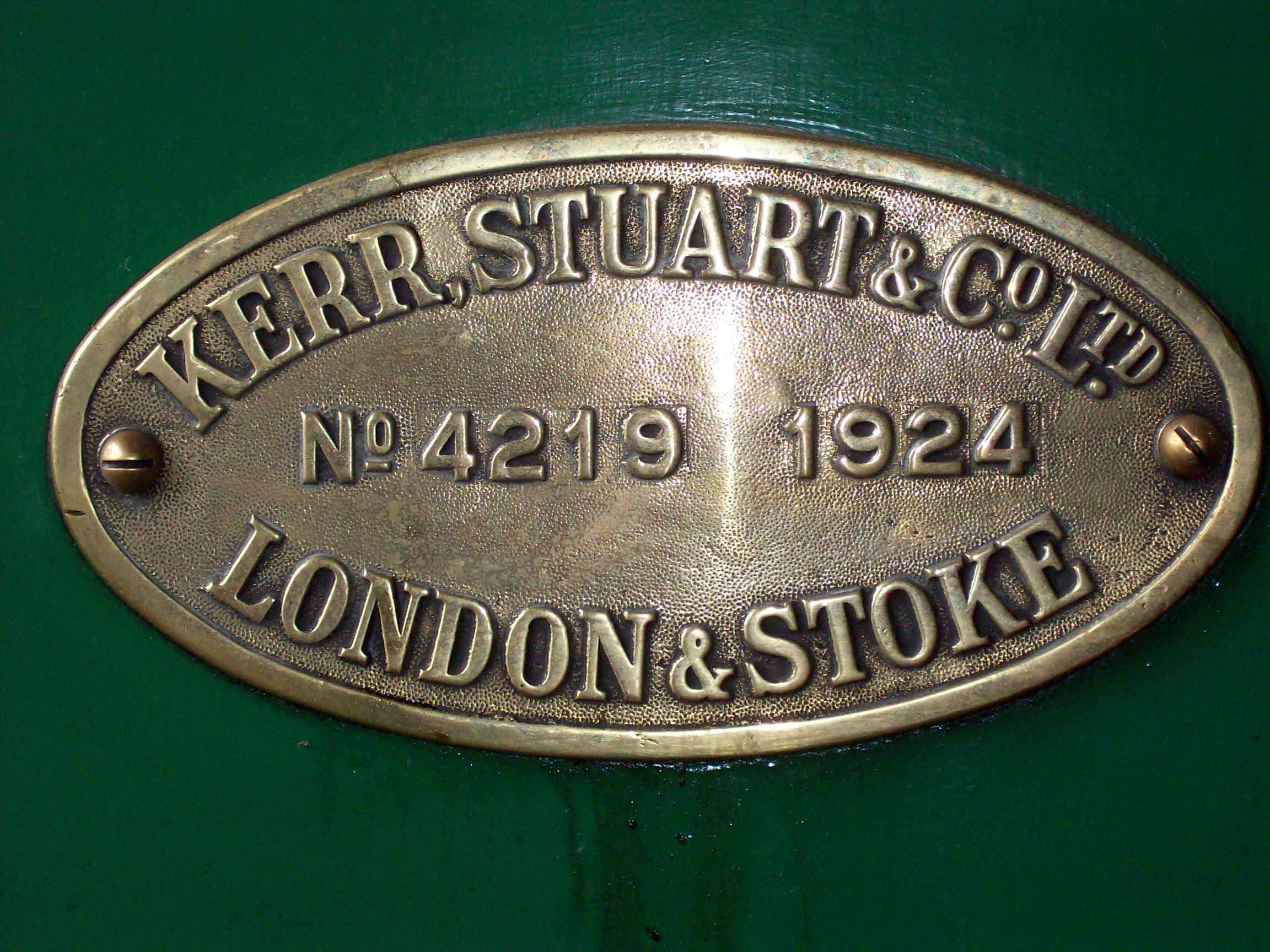
- Works plate from Sittingbourne and Kemsley Light Railway Melior.
- Type: Private
- Industry: Railway
- Founded: 1881 in Glasgow, Scotland
- Founder: James Kerr
- Defunct: 1930; 96 years ago
- Fate: Defunct
- Headquarters: Stoke-on-Trent, England
- Area served: Worldwide
- Products: Steam and diesel locomotives

Kerr, Stuart and Company Ltd was a locomotive manufacturer in Stoke-on-Trent, England.

== History ==
It was founded in 1881 by James Kerr as "James Kerr & Company", and became "Kerr, Stuart & Company" from 1883 when John Stuart was taken on as a partner. The business started in Glasgow, Scotland, but during this time they were only acting as agents ordering locomotives from established manufacturers, among them Falcon, John Fowler & Co. and Hartley, Arnoux and Fanning. They bought the last-named company in 1892 and moved into the California Works in Stoke to begin building all their own locomotives. Hartley, Arnoux and Fanning had also been building railway and tramway plant. This side of their business was sold to Dick, Kerr and Co. in Preston.

== Notable Kerr, Stuart employees ==
- R. J. Mitchell, Premium Apprentice, later to design the Supermarine Spitfire aircraft.
- L. T. C. Rolt, Premium Apprentice, later to be an author and canal/railway preservation pioneer.
- T. C. B. Coleman, Premium Apprentice, later Chief Locomotive Draughtsman of the London Midland & Scottish Railway during the 1930s

== Kerr, Stuart standard designs ==
Kerr, Stuart were known for producing a number of standard designs with many engines being built for stock and sold 'off the shelf' to customers. The names of these locomotive types were often derived from the purchaser of the first of that type or from the name it was given.

The Kerr, Stuart designs are typified by having a single trailing truck (allowing a large firebox to be placed behind the driving wheels) and/or having a saddle tank. Several designs of side tank locomotive were produced that shared a chassis and boiler with a saddle tank design and it is not unknown for a standard chassis from one design to be used with a different design's standard boiler to produce a locomotive to suit a customer's special requirements.

=== Standard gauge designs ===
Name	Image	Wheel arrangement (Whyte)	Weight (long tons)	Notes
Huxley		0-4-0ST	16 Tons	
Witch		0-4-0ST	16 Tons	No 4388 (1928) Stuart is preserved at the Foxfield Railway, near Blythe Bridge in Staffordshire
Moss Bay		0-4-0ST	29 Tons	Named after Moss Bay Haematite Iron & Steel Co Ltd, Workington
Rugeley		0-6-0ST	31 Tons	
Priestley		0-4-0WT	25.5 Tons	No 3063 (1918) initially supplied to the National Shipyard in Beachley was purchased by W & R Parker in 1980. It was restored to working order at The Flour Mill in Bream, Gloucestershire in 2012 and is informally known as 'Willy the Well Tank". was at the Barry Tourist Railway in summer 2021. Now on loan to the Swindon and Cricklade Railway for the 2024 season. This is essentially a Borrows design from the 1860s.
Argentina		0-6-0T	34 Tons	
Victory		0-6-0T		
La Manada		4-4-0		No 1327 (1913) is preserved in Ferro Club Villa Lynch (Argentina)

=== Narrow gauge designs ===
Name	Image	Wheel arrangement (Whyte notation)	Weight (working order)	Notes
Wren		0-4-0ST	3.4 tons (4.2 tons)	Pixie was one of 27 of the Wren class ordered for a sewer contract in Essex, sold to Devon County Council in 1929. Purchased by the Industrial Locomotive Society in 1957, it entered service at Leighton Buzzard Narrow Gauge Railway in 1969. Works number 3114 was part of the same batch of Wrens on the sewer contract. Its history beyond this is uncertain but it is believed that it worked on the dismantling of the Ashover Light Railway. After that it worked on the Bala Lake Railway as "Dryw Bach", and is now owned by the Vale of Rheidol Railway. Peter Pan worked with Pixie in Devon. It was purchased in 1972 by Graham Hall who found the locomotive in a back garden in Bromsgrove and sometimes operates at the Leighton Buzzard Narrow Gauge Railway. Lorna Doone is now preserved by the Birmingham City Museum and Art Gallery and is currently at the Amerton Railway, operational. Also at the Amerton Railway is new build Wren "Jennie", built by the Hunslet Engine Company in 2008. In 2010, the Hunslet Engine Company completed the last Wren "Thomas Wicksteed" for the Kew Bridge Steam Museum in London. Two worked on the Camber Railway in the Falkland Islands
Sirdar		0-4-0T	6.5 tons	Two of three locomotives being built for Allan Alderson and Company of Cairo for use during the Nile Barrage construction in Egypt were diverted to the British War Office in November 1899, for use by the Royal Engineers in a siege park in the Zuid-Afrikaansche Republiek during the Second Boer War. Of the 58 of this class built only 2 are known to survive. No 1158 of 1917 "Diana" privately owned in the UK, and returned to working order in 2015, after 65 years out of use. The second is 652 "Hope", a modified Sirdar, which is classed as a National Monument in Namibia.
Tattoo		0-4-2ST	6.5 tons (8.5 tons)	Three examples exist in the UK, all operational: Stanhope (1917) on the Apedale Valley Light Railway; Talyllyn Railway No.4 Edward Thomas (1921); and Corris Railway No.7 (2005); at least two survive out of service in Namtu, Burma at the Burma Mines Railway. The class was built with either outside frames (such as Stanhope) or inside frames (such as Edward Thomas).
Darwin		0-4-2ST	8.8 tons (10.9 tons)	A Darwin Class with a squared tank, and a Skylark class with either short tanks or long boiler were on the mineral railway around Leadhills in Scotland
Huxley		0-4-2T		At least one survives in working order on the Burma Mines Railway. Joan on the Welshpool and Llanfair Light Railway has a Huxley boiler carried on a modified Matary/Barreto chassis.
Skylark		0-4-2T	10 tons	Skylark Locomotives were used by contractor R. Faris around 1931 at breakwater construction on the River Bann outside Portstewart, Northern Ireland and on the Campbeltown and Machrihanish Light Railway and Snailbeach District Railways. A few survive at a sugar mill in Mauritius. Lukee operates at a tourist railway in Red Cliffs, Australia.
Joffre		0-6-0T	8.5 tons (10.5 tons)	Named after Joseph Joffre; the Joffre class of 70 locomotives was a French Decauville design built by KS under contract during the Great War. Six of the class are known to have survived, one in Africa and five re-imported into the UK; these include Axe on the Lynton & Barnstaple Railway and ones being restored for the Teifi Valley Railway, West Lancashire Light Railway, and the Apedale Valley Light Railway.
Haig		0-6-0T	8.5 tons (10.5 tons)	Named after Douglas Haig, 1st Earl Haig; the Haig class was developed from the Joffre as a result of parts being left unused at the end of the Great War. Two examples survive in New Zealand (one at Ocean Beach Railway in Dunedin, the other at MOTAT in Auckland) and one – Sergeant Murphy – on the Teifi Valley Railway
Brazil		0-4-2ST	10.6 tons (13.6 tons)	Several examples survive, including Excelsior on the Great Whipsnade Railway and three locos (Premier, Leader & Melior) of the Sittingbourne & Kemsley Light Railway
Waterloo		0-4-2ST	15 Tons	
Matary or Barreto (both names used)		0-6-2T	13 tons (17 tons)	At least one original example survives, Superior on the Great Whipsnade Railway. Joan on the Welshpool and Llanfair Light Railway has a modified Matary/Barreto chassis and a Huxley boiler.

== Steam railmotors ==
Kerr, Stuart had a large joiners shop and a significant passenger coach construction business. They were therefore very well placed to build steam railmotors. Their first was a diminutive 2 ft (610 mm) gauge saloon for the Maharajah of Gwalior in 1904 followed by a batch of 12 standard gauge railcars in 1905, six for the Taff Vale Railway, two for the Lancashire and Yorkshire Railway, two for the Great Western Railway, one for the Great Indian Peninsula Railway and one for the Buenos Aires Great Southern Railway. The last two in Indian gauge. The GWR gave a repeat order in 1906 for a further 12 slightly more powerful units. The Mauritius Government Railways ordered one in 1907. The largest rail motor order was for 15 from the Italian State Railways.

- See also Kerr Stuart steam railmotor (one-off, built 1912, for Victorian Railways)

== Custom-built designs ==
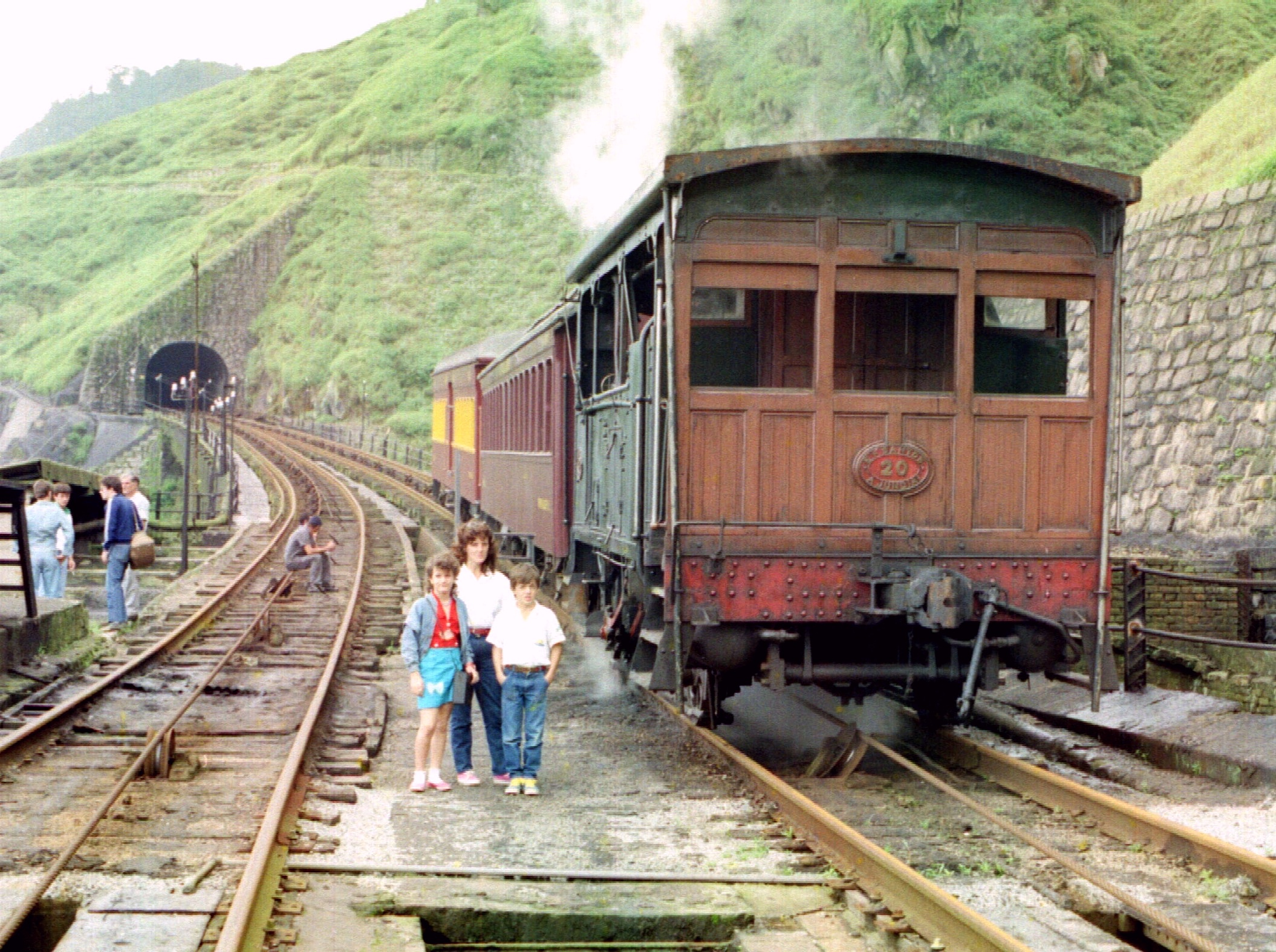
Locobreque with two coaches on a tourist trip in 1987. The locomotive was built by Stephenson in 1931 to an almost identical design to the Kerr Stuarts

In addition to their standard designs, Kerr Stuart accepted orders to build to customers' own designs. From 1900, they built 0-4-0T locobrake for the São Paulo Railway 5 ft 3 in (1,600 mm) gauge cable incline between Paranapiacaba and Piaçagüera. Six of them are preserved.

Narrow-gauge 0-4-0T 652 built in 1899 worked in the docks at Walvis Bay, Namibia until the 1950s and is now preserved in a purpose-built glass-windowed display hut in the forecourt of Walvis Bay station.

Between 1903 and 1904 they produced a 4-6-0 design for several Irish 3 ft (914 mm) gauge lines. A 4-6-2T version was built for the Londonderry and Lough Swilly Railway.

A large 3 ft 6 in (1,067 mm) gauge 0-6-6-0 Meyer followed in 1904. Five American style bar-framed 2-8-0 tender locomotives were built for the 3 ft (914 mm) gauge Interocianic and Mexican Eastern Railways. In May 1910 they built a 2 ft (610 mm) gauge "modified Fairlie" for service in Madras - two 0-4-2T locomotives permanently coupled back to back. They received a repeat order for this combination.

In 1910 a class of four 4-2-2 express passenger locomotives designed by E. J. Dunstan were produced for the Shanghai Nanking Railway. In service these locomotives proved to be faster, smoother running, and more economical than the similar 4-4-0 engines on the same line.

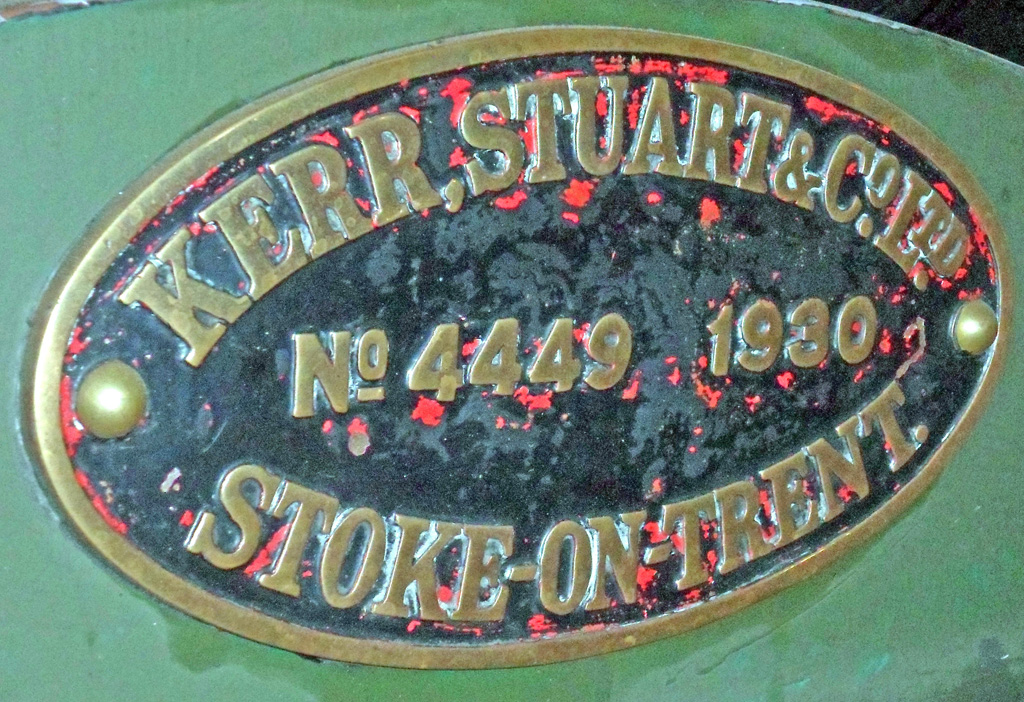
Kerr Stuart works plate from GWR 57XX Class 0-6-0PT 7714 No.4449 of 1930

The company received several orders from the 2 ft (610 mm) gauge Gwalior Light Railway in India. This included four large 2-8-2 tender locomotives in 1928.

Six superheated 4-8-0 mixed traffic locomotives built in 1929 were the last of a series of 4-4-0 and 4-6-0s built for the Buenos Aires Central Railway of Argentina.

After the First World War, Kerr, Stuart received a number of large orders from the British mainline railway companies who were seeking to replace obsolete equipment with their own standard designs. In 1920 the Metropolitan Railway ordered eight superheated 4-4-4T passenger locomotives for the Aylesbury service. Between 1925 and 1927 the London Midland and Scottish Railway ordered fifty standard class 4F 0-6-0 goods locomotives and between 1929 and 1930 the Great Western Railway ordered 25 GWR 5700 Class 0-6-0PTs.

== Diesel locomotives ==
In the late 1920s a number of diesel locomotives were built. These were available with two or three axles for various track gauges. The engines were by McLaren-Benz in 2-cylinder (30 hp), 4-cylinder (60 hp) or 6-cylinder (90 hp) form. Transmission was mechanical and final drive was by roller chains.

They were very successful even though technology moved on quickly. Further development was stopped when Kerr, Stuart's went into receivership, but the Hunslet range of diesel locomotives was based on these. At least 3 Kerr, Stuart diesel locomotives have survived into preservation but none is in original condition having been given different engines.

== The company in liquidation ==
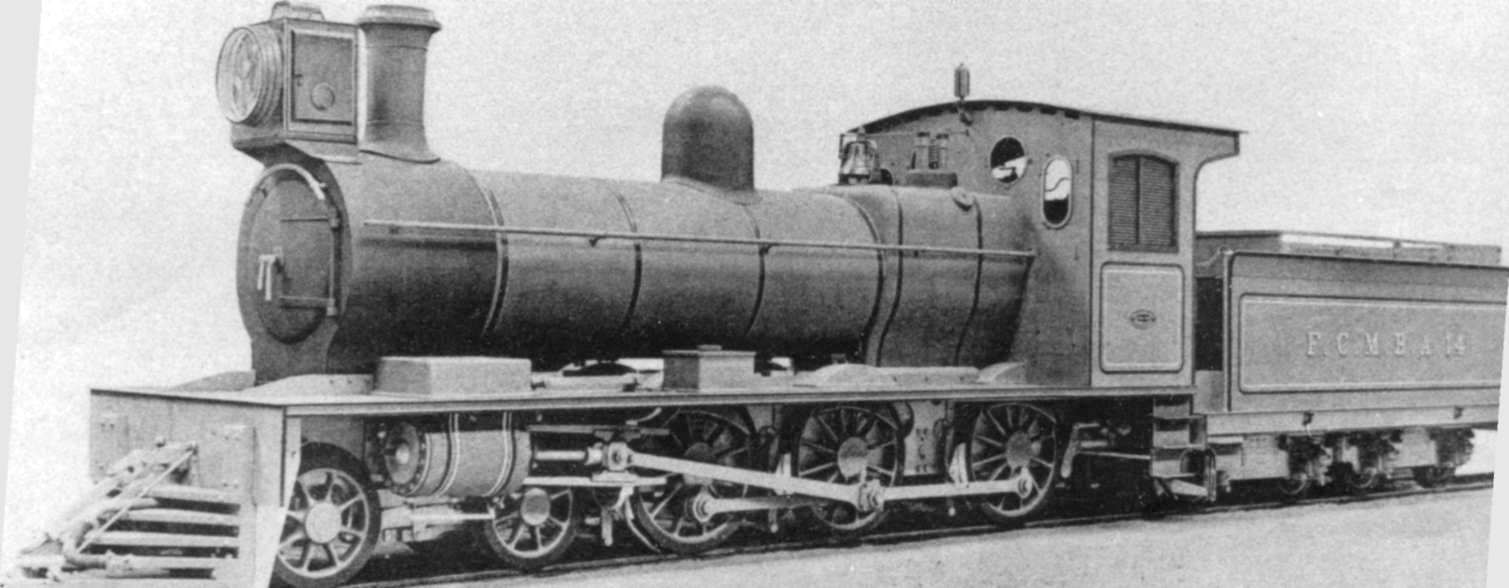
Class E n° 14 1028 used in the Buenos Aires Midland Railway, c. 1930.

On 17 April 1930 a petition calling for the company to be wound up compulsorily was presented in the High Court (Chancery Division) by the Midland Bank. At a hearing held on 8 May 1930 this petition was withdrawn on settlement of an £8,000 guarantee. However, the sale of the works to George Cohen, Sons & Co Ltd was announced in August 1930; a skeleton staff was employed to complete contracts in progress. Another winding-up petition was presented on 10 September 1930 and an order was made on 14 October.

At the creditors' meeting held on 14 November Herbert Langham Reed, the company's chairman and managing director, attributed the failure of the company to the locking up of capital in the Peninsular Locomotive Company, registered in India 1921 to build locomotives (Kerr, Stuart held 80% of the capital and loaned £78,000), the [April] winding-up petition, which had resulted in a loss of confidence in the company, and 'to liabilities incurred by the company in supporting other companies'. Company funds had, apparently, been used to finance a company called Evos Sliding Doorways. This company's failure had triggered the Midland Bank petition. In LTC Rolt's autobiography "The Landscape Trilogy" it is also alleged that the company secretary was discovered to have committed suicide in Kerr, Stuart's London offices, and a large quantity of papers was found to have been burnt in the fireplace. The firm's goodwill (designs, spare parts, etc.) was bought by the Hunslet Engine Company.

Some locomotives were built by W. G. Bagnall to Kerr, Stuart designs, a result of the chief Kerr, Stuart draughtsman, F. H. B. Harris, and a number of other Kerr, Stuart staff being employed by Bagnall's. These locomotives include examples of the Haig and Matary classes. The last steam locomotive built in Britain for industrial use was a Hunslet-built Brazil class engine in 1971. This locomotive is now running on the private Statfold Barn Railway. The Corris Railway commissioned a new locomotive based on the "Tattoo" design of its original No.4 (KS 4047 of 1921) and this was privately built over a ten-year period and went into service in 2005 as No.7.

== In popular culture ==
Wilbert Awdry based the character of Peter Sam on a Kerr Stuart Tattoo locomotive built for the Corris Railway in The Railway Series.

== Preservation ==
Owner	Class	Name	Serial No.	Image	Built Date	Whyte Notation	Gauge	Notes
Apedale Valley Light Railway	Tattoo	Stanhope	2395		1917	0-4-2ST	2 ft (610 mm)	ex-Penrhyn Quarry Railway
Amerton Railway	Wren	Lorna Doone	4250		1922	0-4-0ST	2 ft (610 mm)	Purchased by RH Neal and sold to Devon County Council. Restoration to working order completed in 2018.
Amerton Railway	Wren	Jennie	Hunslet 3905		2008	0-4-0ST	2 ft (610 mm)	Built by the Hunslet Engine Company in 2008 to the Kerr, Stuart Wren design, bought privately and housed at the Amerton Railway.
Amerton Railway	Sirdar	Diana	1158		1917	0-4-0T	2 ft (610 mm)	ex Kerry Tramway Oakeley Quarry and Pen-yr-Orsedd Quarry
Museum of Antigua and Barbuda	Brazil	Marion	1178		1911	0-4-2ST	2 ft 6 in (762 mm)	
Buckinghamshire Railway Centre	GWR 5700	7714	4449		1930	0-6-0PT	4 ft 8 1/2 in (1,435 mm)	Only Preserved Kerr Stuart Built 57XX
Buckinghamshire Railway Centre	90 hp Diesel	Redland	K4428		1929	4wDM	4 ft 8 1/2 in (1,435 mm)	Heavily rebuilt
Burma Mines Railway, Myanmar	Tattoo	No. 11	1264		1919	0-4-2ST	2 ft (610 mm)	
Burma Mines Railway, Myanmar	Tattoo	No. 14	1288		1915	0-4-2ST	2 ft (610 mm)	
Burma Mines Railway, Myanmar	Tattoo	No. 15	1289		1915	0-4-2ST	2 ft (610 mm)	
Cavan and Leitrim Railway		Dromad	3024		1916	0-4-2T	3 ft (914 mm)	Rebuilt using a hotel boiler and parts from several other Irish locomotives
Corris Railway	Tattoo	No. 7			2005	0-4-2ST	2 ft 3 in (686 mm)	Design based on the railway's original Tattoo (KS 4047)
Foxfield Railway	Witch		4388			0-4-0ST	4 ft 8 1/2 in (1,435 mm)	
90 hp Diesel	Rom River		4421		1929	6wDM	4 ft 8 1/2 in (1,435 mm)	ex-R&ER, re-engined 1959
Great Whipsnade Railway	Brazil	Excelsior	1049		1908	0-4-2ST	2 ft 6 in (762 mm)	ex-Bowaters Paper Railway
Great Whipsnade Railway	Barretto	Superior	4034		1920	0-6-2ST	2 ft 6 in (762 mm)	ex-Bowaters Paper Railway
Leighton Buzzard Railway	Wren	Pixie	4260		1922	0-4-0ST	2 ft (610 mm)	
Lynton and Barnstaple Railway	Joffre	Axe	2451		1915	0-6-0ST	2 ft (610 mm)	ex-Gloddfa Ganol. Heavily rebuilt, but retaining many original parts, Axe Returned to Steam on 11 November 2008 at Woody Bay for a dedication ceremony to honour the fallen railwaymen of the First World War
Owned by Graham Morris	Wren	Peter Pan	4256		1922	0-4-0ST	2 ft (610 mm)	
West Lancashire Light Railway	Joffre	"Joffre"	2405		1915	0-6-0WT+T	2 ft (610 mm)	ex-Carriers de la Valee-Meureuse et Haut Bain Hydrequent, Pas de Calais, France
Moseley Railway Trust	Joffre		3014		1916	0-6-0WT+T	2 ft (610 mm)	ex-Gloddfa Ganol
Beamish Museum			721			0-4-0WT	2 ft (610 mm)	ex-Dundee Gasworks
Ocean Beach Railway Dunedin, New Zealand	Haig		4185		1929	0-6-0T	3 ft 6 in (1,067 mm)	Built for Kempthorne Prosser. Regularly operated on passenger trains
MOTAT Auckland, New Zealand	Haig		4183		1929	0-6-0T	3 ft 6 in (1,067 mm)	This locomotive spent its entire working life with Kempthorne Prosser Ltd. at their Westfield (Auckland, N.Z.) fertiliser works. Retired in 1966, it was donated to MOTAT and operated there for a short time until boiler repairs were required. After a period on static display, the locomotive was dismantled during the 1970s for restoration. Ultimately the dismantled locomotive was leased to McDonald's Restaurants, and following restoration was on static display at their Paraparaumu establishment from 1987 to 2008, before being returned to MOTAT where it remains in the locomotive shed awaiting restoration to working order.
Statfold Barn Railway		Parasuram	4408		1928	0-6-4T	2 ft 6 in (762 mm)	Ex-Parlakimedi Light Railway, India
Philippine National Railways	Cabanatuan	Cabanatuan	777		1905	0-6-0T	3 ft 6 in (1,067 mm)	This was originally built for the British-owned Manila Railway Company and was the lead locomotive of its class. It is now on static display in front of Tutuban station.
Philippine National Railways	Cavite	Dagupan	1007		1907	0-6-0T	3 ft 6 in (1,067 mm)	This saddle tank locomotive was built for Manila Railway and was rebuilt from the original Cavite locomotive. Like Cabanatuan, it is now on static display in front of Tutuban station. One of its parts were damaged.
Red Cliffs Historical Steam Railway, Victoria, Australia	Skylark	Lukee	742		1901	0-4-2T	2 ft (610 mm)	The Red Cliffs Historical Steam Railway was formed in 1994 under the auspices of the Red Cliffs Rotary Club to operate the restored 'Lukee', that had formerly operated between Red Cliffs railway station and the Red Cliffs pumping station. A two kilometre section of the former 1600mm gauge Red Cliffs – Morkalla branch line has been converted to 610mm gauge for tourist train operation. The train normally operates on the first Sunday of each month from 11am to 4.00pm and on Easter Saturday and the Sundays of the Labour Day and Queens Birthday long weekends. The Train does not operate in January or February because of the fire danger.
Sandstone Steam Railway, Ficksburg, South Africa	Wren	Little Bess	4031		1919	0-4-0ST	2 ft (610 mm)	
Sandstone Steam Railway, Ficksburg, South Africa			4063		1924	0-4-2PT	2 ft (610 mm)	
Sandstone Steam Railway, Ficksburg, South Africa			1344		1913	4-6-2T	2 ft (610 mm)	
Sittingbourne & Kemsley Light Railway	Brazil	Leader	926		1906	0-4-2ST	2 ft 6 in (762 mm)	
Sittingbourne & Kemsley Light Railway	Brazil	Premier	886		1905	0-4-2ST	2 ft 6 in (762 mm)	
Sittingbourne & Kemsley Light Railway	Brazil	Melior	4219		1924	0-4-2ST	2 ft 6 in (762 mm)	
Severn Valley Railway	GWR 5700 No. 7714		4449		1930	0-6-0PT	4 ft 8 1/2 in (1,435 mm)	Operational as of October 2018.
Statfold Barn Railway	Brazil	Trangkil No.4	3902		1971	0-4-2ST	2 ft (610 mm)	The last industrial steam locomotive built in Britain, regauged from 2 ft 6 in (762 mm) gauge.
Talyllyn Railway	modified Tattoo	Edward Thomas	4047		1921	0-4-2ST	2 ft 3 in (686 mm)	ex Corris Railway No.4; carried same number under CR, GWR, BR & TR ownership
Teifi Valley Railway	Haig	Sgt. Murphy				0-6-2ST	2 ft (610 mm)	ex-Penrhyn Quarry Railway, Heavily rebuilt
Privately Preserved, Kent	Joffre		2442		1915	0-6-0WT+T	2 ft (610 mm)	ex-Gloddfa Ganol
Vale of Rheidol Railway	Wren		3114		1918	0-4-0ST	2 ft (610 mm)	Formerly carried names Brockamin or Dryw Bach
Welsh Highland Railway	60 hp Diesel		4415		1928	6wDM	1 ft 11 1/2 in (597 mm)	One of the earliest diesel locomotives in existence
Welshpool and Llanfair Light Railway	modified Matary with Huxley boiler	Joan			1927	0-6-2ST	2 ft 6 in (762 mm)	Originally operated in Antigua, overhauled with a new boiler of revised design.
Statfold Barn Railway	Joffre		3010		1916	0-6-0WT+T	2 ft (610 mm)	ex-Gloddfa Ganol, formerly stored at the Yaxham Light Railway
Santa Cruz do Rio Pardo, SP (Brazil)		Sinhá Moça (ex- Maceió) No. 1	928		July 1907	0-4-2T	3 ft 3 3/8 in (1,000 mm)	operational (weekend and holiday tourist services); most authors still believe her to be static at Usina Serra Grande in São José da Laje, AL
Usina Serra Grande in São José da Laje, AL (Brazil)		No. 2	1244		January 1912	0-4-2T	3 ft 3 3/8 in (1,000 mm)	static
Usina Serra Grande in São José da Laje, AL (Brazil)		Mestre Borges (ex- Nesita Forges) No. 4	4193		September 1927	0-6-2T	3 ft 3 3/8 in (1,000 mm)	operational (tourist services)
Fives Lille in Maceió, AL (Brazil)		unknown	4389		March 1927	0-4-2T	1 ft 11 1/2 in (597 mm)	static (former Usina Cansanção do Sinimbu locomotive)
Usina Central Olho d'Água in Camutanga, PE (Brazil)		unknown	4302		June 1926	0-4-2T	2 ft 5 1/2 in (749 mm)	static
Usina Catende in Catende, PE (Brazil)		No. 1	1281		December 1912	0-4-2T	3 ft 3 3/8 in (1,000 mm)	static
Fazenda Guaritá in Rio das Flores, RJ (Brazil)	Wren	none	1248		said to be 1914	0-4-0ST	1 ft 11 1/2 in (597 mm)	operational
1st Railway Battalion of the Brazilian Army in Lages, SC (Brazil)	Wren	Jaguarizinho No. 3	1194		June 1912	0-4-0ST	1 ft 11 1/2 in (597 mm)	static
Fazenda Angélica in Dourado, SP (Brazil)		No. 1	673		June 1912	0-6-2ST	1 ft 11 1/2 in (597 mm)	static
entrance of Paranapiacaba, SP (Brazil)		No. 8	668		1900	0-4-0LB	5 ft 3 in (1,600 mm)	static
Museu Ferroviário de Paranapiacaba, Paranapiacaba, Brazil	Wren	No. 1	1015		December 1907	0-4-0ST	1 ft 11 1/2 in (597 mm)	static (in operational condition)
	none	No. 7	671		1900	0-4-0LB	5 ft 3 in (1,600 mm)	static (in operational condition)
Fazenda Vassoural in Pontal, Brazil	Wren	No. 1	1195		1912	0-4-0ST	1 ft 11 1/2 in (597 mm)	static
Locomotive Depot at Estação da Luz in São Paulo, Brazil		No. 2	662		1900	0-4-0LB	5 ft 3 in (1,600 mm)	static
ABPF - Regional São Paulo in São Paulo, Brazil	none	No. 4	664		1900	0-4-0LB	5 ft 3 in (1,600 mm)	static (in operational condition)
ABPF - Regional São Paulo in São Paulo, Brazil	none	No. 9	669		1900	0-4-0LB	5 ft 3 in (1,600 mm)	awaiting restoration
ABPF - Regional São Paulo in São Paulo, Brazil	none	No. 11	667		1900	0-4-0LB	5 ft 3 in (1,600 mm)	awaiting restoration
St. Kitts Sugar Corp	Brazil	No. 5	1314		1916	0-4-2ST		derelict
