= Tony (footballer, born 1989) =

Brazilian footballer

Personal information
- Full name: Tony Ewerton Ramos da Silva
- Date of birth: 4 August 1989 (age 37)
- Place of birth: Maraial, Brazil
- Height: 1.77 m (5 ft 10 in)
- Position: Right-back

Team information
- Current team: Paysandu
- Number: 2

Youth career
- 2008–2009: CRB
- 2010: Sport

Senior career*
| Years | Team | Apps | (Gls) |
| 2009–2010 | CRB | 4 | (0) |
| 2011–2012 | Juventus-SP | 21 | (1) |
| 2012–2015 | Grêmio | 18 | (0) |
| 2013 | → Criciúma (loan) | 6 | (1) |
| 2014 | → Portuguesa (loan) | 3 | (0) |
| 2014 | → Santa Cruz (loan) | 26 | (2) |
| 2015 | → Bahia (loan) | 34 | (0) |
| 2016–2017 | Mirassol | 13 | (0) |
| 2017 | → Goiás (loan) | 16 | (0) |
| 2018 | Grêmio Novorizontino | 12 | (0) |
| 2018 | Ponte Preta | 2 | (0) |
| 2018 | São Bento | 20 | (1) |
| 2019 | Oeste | 9 | (0) |
| 2019– | Paysandu | 56 | (1) |
- * Club domestic league appearances and goals as of 22:08, 18 June 2019 (UTC)

Tony Ewerton Ramos da Silva (born 4 August 1989), or simply Tony, is a Brazilian professional footballer who plays as a right-back for Paysandu.

== Career ==
Born in Maraial, Pernambuco, Tony made his senior debuts with CRB, in 2009. After a short period with Sport Recife's youth setup he returned to senior football, signing with Juventus-SP.

On 15 May 2012, Tony signed with Grêmio, and made his Campeonato Brasileiro Série A debut on 17 June, playing the last 15 minutes of a 1–0 away loss against Náutico. On 6 June of the following year he was loaned to Criciúma, and scored his first top flight goal with Tigre, but in a 2–1 away loss against Santos.

On 17 January 2014, Tony was loaned to Portuguesa. After appearing rarely he moved to Santa Cruz on 23 May.

== Career statistics ==
As of 30 September 2014

Appearances and goals by club, season and competition
| Club | Season | League | | | National cup | | Continental | | Other | | Total | |
| Club | Season | Division | Apps | Goals | Apps | Goals | Apps | Goals | Apps | Goals | Apps | Goals |
|---|---|---|---|---|---|---|---|---|---|---|---|---|
| CRB | 2009 | Série C | 3 | 0 | 0 | 0 | 0 | 0 | 0 | 0 | 3 | 0 |
| CRB | 2010 | Série C | 1 | 0 | 0 | 0 | 0 | 0 | 0 | 0 | 1 | 0 |
| CRB | Total | | 4 | 0 | 0 | 0 | 0 | 0 | 0 | 0 | 4 | 0 |
| Juventus-SP | 2011 | State | 0 | 0 | 0 | 0 | 0 | 0 | 0 | 0 | 0 | 0 |
| Juventus-SP | 2012 | State | 21 | 10 | 0 | 0 | 0 | 0 | 0 | 0 | 21 | 10 |
| Juventus-SP | Total | | 21 | 10 | 0 | 0 | 0 | 0 | 0 | 0 | 21 | 10 |
| Grêmio | 2012 | Série A | 10 | 0 | 0 | 0 | 1 | 0 | 0 | 0 | 11 | 0 |
| Grêmio | 2013 | Série A | 0 | 0 | 0 | 0 | 1 | 0 | 6 | 0 | 7 | 0 |
| Grêmio | 2014 | Série A | 0 | 0 | 0 | 0 | 0 | 0 | 0 | 0 | 0 | 0 |
| Grêmio | Total | | 10 | 0 | 0 | 0 | 2 | 0 | 6 | 0 | 18 | 0 |
| Criciúma (loan) | 2013 | Série A | 4 | 1 | 0 | 0 | 2 | 0 | 0 | 0 | 6 | 1 |
| Portuguesa (loan) | 2014 | Série B | 0 | 0 | 0 | 0 | 0 | 0 | 3 | 0 | 3 | 0 |
| Santa Cruz (loan) | 2014 | Série B | 13 | 1 | 3 | 0 | 0 | 0 | 0 | 0 | 16 | 1 |
| Career total | | | 52 | 12 | 3 | 0 | 4 | 0 | 9 | 0 | 68 | 12 |
