= São Benedito do Sul =

Municipality of Pernambuco, Brazil

- Municipality of Pernambuco, Brazil
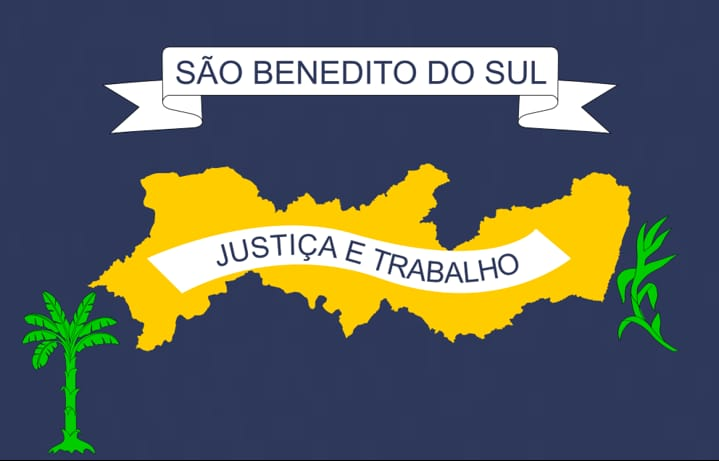
- Flag

- Location of São Benedito do Sul in Pernambuco

- Location within Brazil Location within South America
- Coordinates: 8°48′28″S 35°56′0″W
- Country: Brazil
- Region: Northeast
- State: Pernambuco
- Founded: 13 May 1964

Government
  - Mayor: José Rinaldo de Figueredo Lopes (PP) (2025-2028)
  - Vice Mayor: Célio Alberto Gomes de Amorim (PP) (2025-2028)

Area
  - Total: 160.477 km^{2} (61.961 sq mi)
- Elevation: 474 m (1,555 ft)

Population (2022 Census)
  - Total: 13,113
  - Estimate (2025): 13,456
  - Density: 81.71/km^{2} (211.6/sq mi)
- Demonym: São-beneditense (Brazilian Portuguese)
- Time zone: UTC-03:00 (Brasília Time)
- Postal code: 55410-000, 55412-000
- HDI (2010): 0.530 – low
- Website: saobeneditodosul.pe.gov.br

São Benedito do Sul (Central northeastern portuguese pronunciation: [ˈsɐ̃w biniˈditu du su]) is a city in the state of Pernambuco, Brazil. It is located 172.5 km away from Recife, the capital of the state of Pernambuco. As of 2025, according to IBGE estimates, it has a population of 13,456 inhabitants.

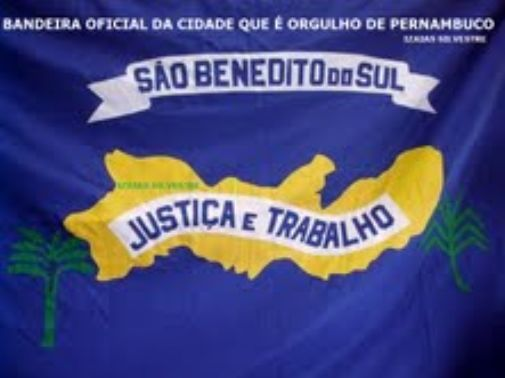
City Flag

== Geography ==
- State - Pernambuco
- Region - Zona da mata Pernambucana
- Boundaries - Lagoa dos Gatos (N); Alagoas state (S); Maraial and Jaqueira (E); Quipapá and Panelas (W)
- Area - 156.78 km^{2}
- Elevation - 474 m
- Hydrography - Una River
- Vegetation - Subperenifólia forest
- Climate - Hot tropical and humid
- Annual average temperature - 22.9 c
- Distance to Recife - 172.5 km

== Economy ==
The main economic activities in São Benedito do Sul are based in agribusiness, especially sugarcane, bananas; and livestock such as cattle and chickens.

=== Economic indicators ===
Population	GDP x(1000 R$).	GDP pc (R$)	PE
10.838	31.440	3.211	0.05%

Economy by Sector 2006

Primary sector	Secondary sector	Service sector
14.84%	8.21%	76.95%

=== Health indicators ===
HDI (2000)	Hospitals (2007)	Hospitals beds (2007)	Children's Mortality every 1000 (2005)
0.549	1	28	15.8

== See also ==
- List of municipalities in Pernambuco
