= Camber Railway =

Former narrow-gauge railway of the Falkland Islands

Coordinates: 51.6828°S 57.8842°W

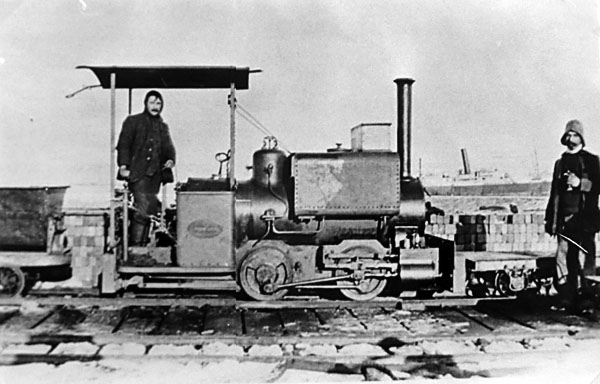
- One of the two 'Wren' class narrow gauge steam locomotives of Camber Railway on the Falkland Islands, 1915.

Overview
- Locale: Stanley, Falkland Islands
- Termini: Stanley Harbour; Admiralty wireless station
- Stations: none

Service
- Type: Narrow gauge railway
- Rolling stock: 2 locomotives and 3 cars

History
- Opened: 1915
- Closed: 1920 / 1940

Technical
- Line length: 5.6 km (3.5 mi)
- Num of tracks: Single track
- Track gauge: 2 ft (610 mm)

The Camber Railway was a 2 ft (610 mm) narrow gauge railway located on the Falkland Islands in the South Atlantic. It was one of the most southerly railways in the world.

The Camber Railway was constructed to support the Admiralty wireless station, supplying coal to generators which powered the station. It ran along the north side of Stanley Harbour for about 3.5 miles (5.6 km).

== History ==
There were two Kerr, Stuart and Company "Wren" class 0-4-0 steam tank locomotives. The system fell into disuse after the wireless station was modernised. Parts of the infrastructure were used in the Falklands War; rails were taken for use in some defensive structures.

== Fleet ==
- KS "Wren" class steam locomotives - 2 (KS 2388/15 and 2392/15)
- wooden wagon cars - 3
- steam crane (on flat car) - 1
- tipper wagon
- flat car wagon

Both locomotives lay derelict at Navy Point for many years, until they were rescued and placed into containers for safety. The Falkland Islands Government considered cosmetically restoring one of the engines, but this idea was abandoned in 2010.

== Gallery ==
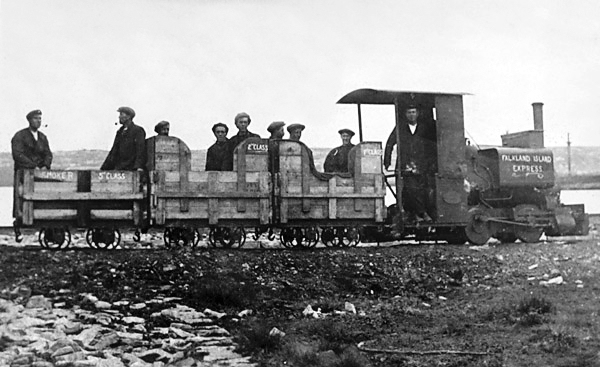
Camber Railway, 1915-1922. The loco has 'Falkland Island Express' handwritten on the tank. The wooden wagon bodies carry removable seats at each end for workmen. The 1st class, 2nd class, 3rd class, and 'Smoker' legends, not to mention that on the loco's tank, seem to imply that the whole thing was seen as a bit of a joke. The photo was later used on a Falkland Islands 54p stamp.

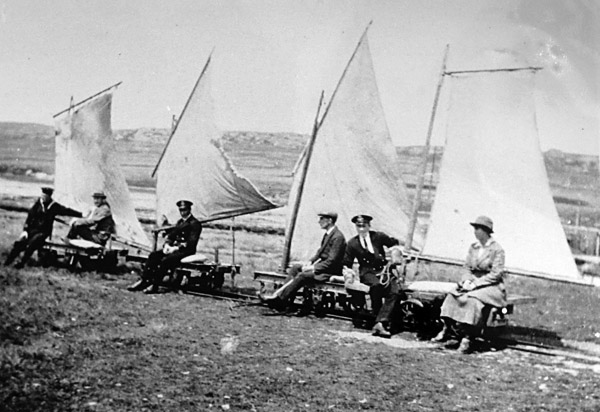
Sail-driven waggons with balanced lug, standing lug and gaff rigs (early 1920s)
