= Manila Railway V class =

Manila Railway Cabanatuan class
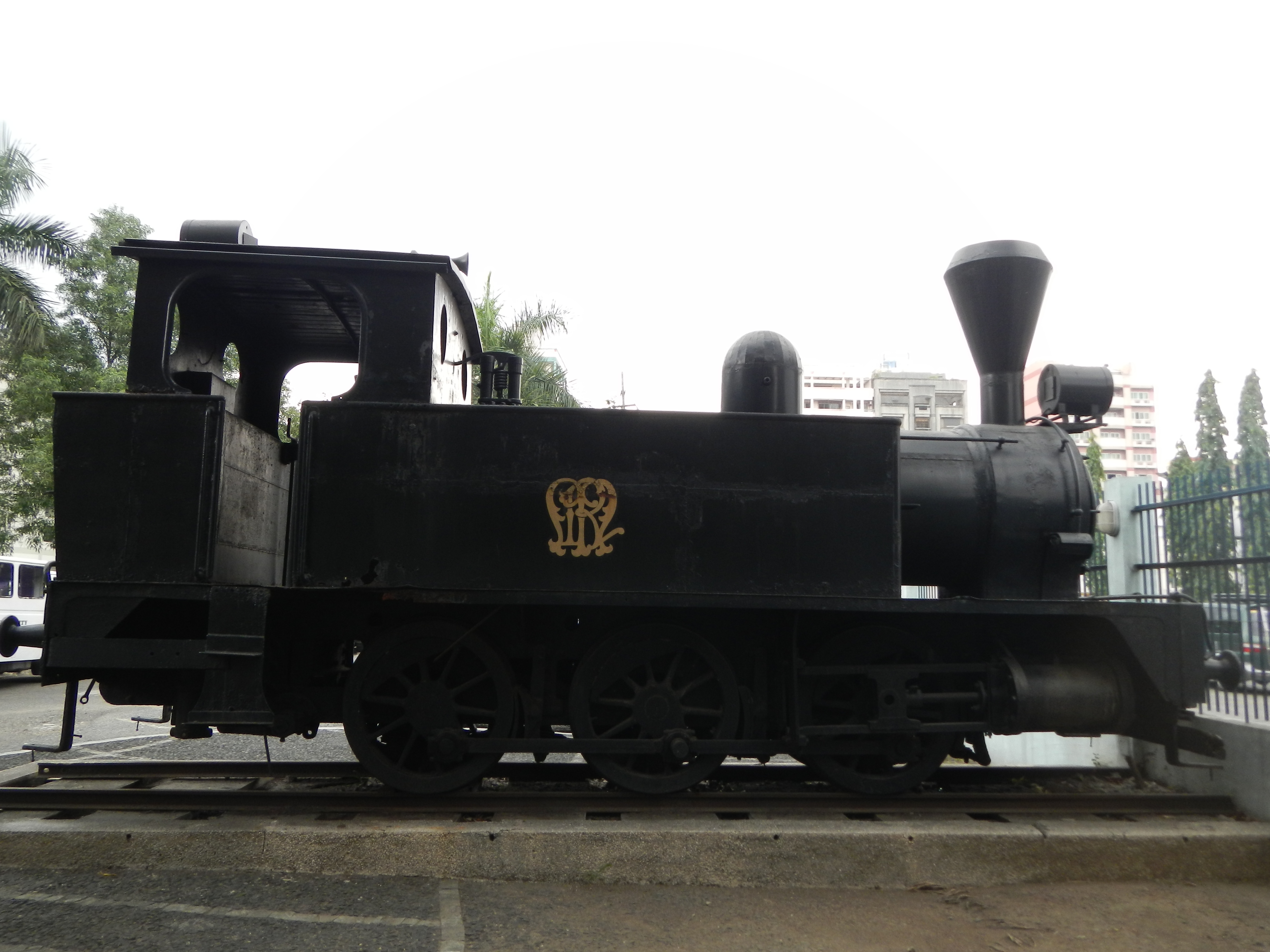
- No. 777 Cabanatuan, the only survivor of the class.
Type and origin
- Power type: Steam
- Builder: Kerr, Stuart and Company
- Serial number: 777-778
- Build date: 1905
- Total produced: 2
Specifications
- Configuration
  - Whyte: 0-6-0T
  - UIC: Ct
- Gauge: 3 ft 6 in (1,067 mm)
- Valve gear: Stephenson
- Couplers: Buffers and chain coupler Janney coupler
Performance figures
- Maximum speed: 21 mph (34 km/h)
Career
- Operators: Manila Railway Company; Manila Railroad Company
- Number in class: 2
- Locale: North Main Line; Batangas branch
- Delivered: 1905
- First run: 1905
- Last run: 1956
- Retired: 1956
- Preserved: 1
- Scrapped: c. 1945 (Batangas)
- Disposition: No. 777 Cabanatuan survived, No. 778 Batangas scrapped

The Manila Railway V class are a class of two 0-6-0 side tank locomotives built in 1905 by Kerr, Stuart and Company. They were operated by the Manila Railway and the Manila Railroad Companies until 1956. One locomotive survives today on display in front of Tutuban station in Tondo, Manila.

== Background ==
The names of the two locomotives suggest the opening of the two branch lines of the Manila Railway Company in 1905. These were the 58 km (36 mi) Batangas line and the Cabanatuan line. The Cabanatuan line, namesake of No. 777 Cabanatuan, was a branch of the North Main Line that led to Cabanatuan in the Central Luzon province of Nueva Ecija. It would branch off the North Main Line near Bigaa in Bulacan. Cabanatuan is 120 kilometers (75 mi) from Manila and therefore would require lighter-duty rolling stock than the mainline. The Batangas line, namesake of No. 778 Batangas, was the longest branch of the South Main Line. The line would branch off in Calamba, Laguna and would head towards Batangas City.

== Design ==
The Cabanatuan class was the first of three locomotive classes with the 0-6-0 wheel arrangement. The succeeding Cavite class would also be built in the same arrangement and was also built by Kerr Stuart. The last class was Mirador which was a single cog locomotive built by Swiss Locomotive and Machine Works in 1914.

== Service ==
There was no documentation on which services were the two locomotives were used. However, No. 777 Cabanatuan managed to survive World War II and was retired in 1956 with all the steam locomotives from mainline service. Afterwards, it has been on static display in front of Tutuban station in Manila. The Batangas line continued to operate without steam locomotives, but was eventually closed due to the preference of the government to build highways. The Cabanatuan line was also closed in the 1980s for the same reason.

Cabanatuan's center chain mechanism as part of its buffers and chain coupler was replaced by a Janney coupler sometime during its service life.
