= Diana (locomotive) =

Narrow gauge steam locomotive

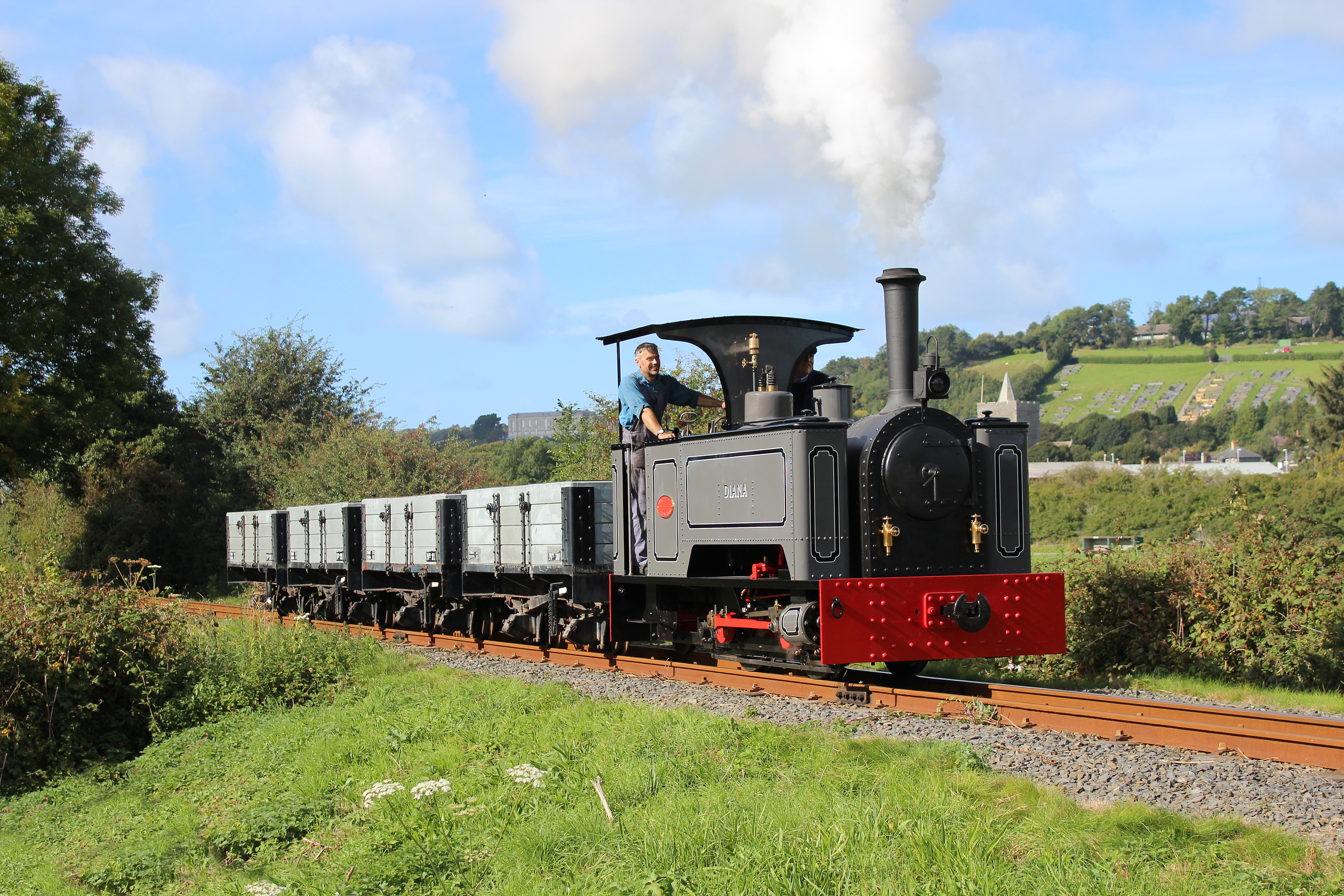
- Diana at the Vale of Rheidol Light Railway in 2015
Type and origin
- Power type: Steam
- Builder: Kerr, Stuart and Company
- Serial number: 1158
- Model: Sirdar
- Build date: 1909
Specifications
- Configuration
  - Whyte: 0-4-0T
- Gauge: 2 ft (610 mm)
- Cylinders: Two, outside
Career
- Operators: Amerton Railway

Diana is a narrow gauge 0-4-0T steam locomotive. It was built by Kerr, Stuart and Company in 1909, and was delivered to the Kerry Tramway in Mid Wales, in 1917. After varied service in the Welsh slate industry, Diana was purchased by railway enthusiast Graham Mullis in 1964. After many years at a variety of location, Diana was purchased by a Talyllyn Railway volunteer in 2014, and restored to working order in 2015.

== Industrial service ==
Diana was built in 1909 by Kerr, Stuart as part of an order for six 750 mm (2 ft 5 1/2 in) gauge locomotives for Mauritius. Although several of the locomotives in the order were sent to Mauritius, Diana wasn’t delivered and stayed at Kerr, Stuart's factory in Stoke on Trent. In 1917, the locomotive was purchased by the Home Grown Timber Committee of the Board of Trade for use on the Kerry Tramway, near Newtown, Powys in Mid Wales. It was regauged to 2 ft (610 mm) and delivered to Kerry, Powys.

The Kerry Tramway closed in 1922, though a short length was retained, and worked by an unknown locomotive, probably Diana. In 1925, Diana was sold to the Oakeley Quarry in Blaenau Ffestiniog, where it worked for the next twenty years. In 1945, it was sold on to the Pen-yr-Orsedd Quarry in the Nantlle Valley, where it and worked until its boiler was condemned in 1950.

== Preservation ==
In August 1964, Graham Mullis visited Pen-yr-Orsedd. He purchased Diana, which by then was derelict. He moved the locomotive to his private Wychbold Railway at Droitwich. He sold his collection in October 1970, and Diana was purchased by Tony Hills, who moved it to Gilfach Ddu on the Llanberis Lake Railway. In 1972, Diana moved to Hills' new base at the recently opened Brecon Mountain Railway.

At some point, Diana was sold to D. Davies of Clydach near Swansea. It was partly restored by Alan Keef in the late 1990s. Following Davies’ death, Diana was purchased in 2014 by Talyllyn Railway volunteer Phil Mason. Mason completed Diana's restoration to working order at the workshops of the Vale of Rheidol Railway, in Aberystwyth. Restoration of the locomotive was completed in October 2015, and it was launched into service on the Bala Lake Railway at the end of that year. In 2017 the loco was 100 years old and was taken on a tour around some of the UK's railways visiting Statfold Barn, Beamish, The Ffestiniog & Welsh Highland, Apedale, Amerton and Leighton Buzzard. Following the tour, the locomotive underwent minor alterations at Statfold Barn in late 2017. In early 2018, Diana moved to the Amerton Railway.
