= Jaqueira =

Municipality of Pernambuco, Brazil

- Municipality of Pernambuco, Brazil
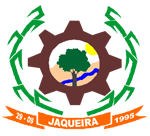
- Flag Coat of arms

- Location of Jaqueira in Pernambuco

- Location within Brazil Location within South America
- Coordinates: 8°43′37″S 35°47′34″W
- Country: Brazil
- Region: Northeast
- State: Pernambuco
- Founded: 28 September 1995

Government
  - Mayor: Ridete Cellibe Pellegrino de Macedo Oliveira (PSD) (2025-2028)
  - Vice Mayor: Jose Eudo Alves (PSDB) (2025-2028)

Area
  - Total: 87.208 km^{2} (33.671 sq mi)
- Elevation: 175 m (574 ft)

Population (2022 Census)
  - Total: 10,247
  - Estimate (2025): 10,440
  - Density: 117.5/km^{2} (304/sq mi)
- Demonym: Jaqueirense (Brazilian Portuguese)
- Time zone: UTC-03:00 (Brasília Time)
- Postal code: 55409-000
- HDI (2010): 0.575 – medium
- Website: jaqueira.pe.gov.br

Jaqueira (Central northeastern portuguese pronunciation: [ʒɐˈkeɾɐ]) is a city located in the state of Pernambuco, Brazil with an estimated (IBGE 2020) population of 11,644.

== Geography ==
Jaqueira is located in the Brazilian state of Pernambuco, in the coastal Zona da Mata region. The city is 147 kilometers away from the state's capital city of Recife. It is bound by the Lagoa dos Gatos to the north, Maraial to the south, Catende to the east, and São Benedito do Sul to the west. The city has an area of 89.09 square kilometers, at an elevation of 143. The area has a humid, tropical climate, and Jaqueira's annual average temperature is 25.2 °C. Near the city are the Una River and the Subcaducifólia forest.

== Economy ==
The main economic activities in Jaqueira are based in agribusiness, particularly sugarcane and bananas.

=== Economic indicators ===
Population	GDP x(1000 R$).	GDP pc (R$)	PE
12.642	37.945	3.135	0.06%

Economy by Sector 2006

Primary sector	Secondary sector	Service sector
18.10%	6.58%	75.32%

=== Health indicators ===
HDI (2000)	Hospitals (2007)	Hospitals beds (2007)	Children's Mortality every 1000 (2005)
0.588	---	---	21.4

== See also ==
- List of municipalities in Pernambuco
