= Great Whipsnade Railway =

Narrow-gauge railway in England

Coordinates: 51.849°N 0.545°W

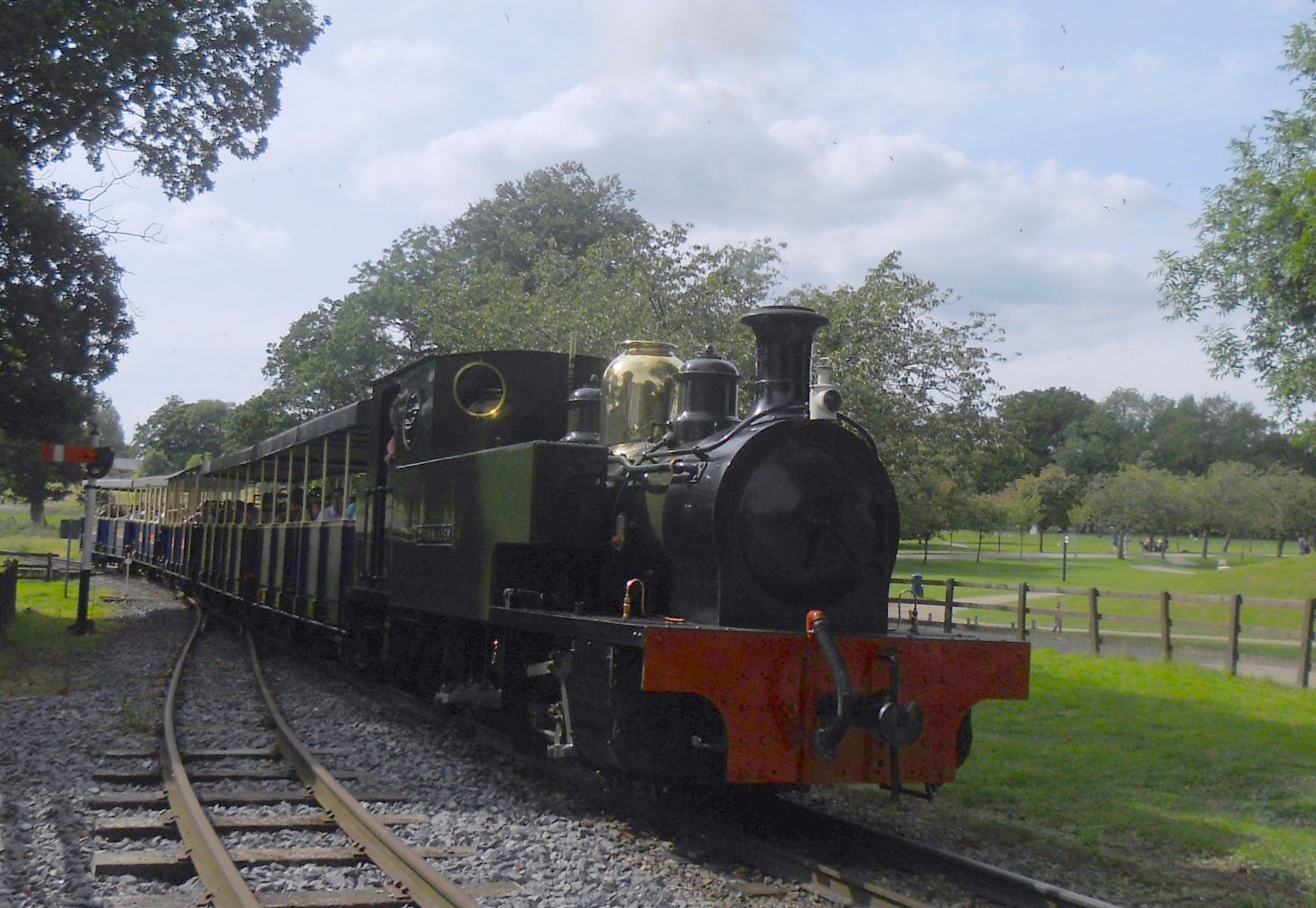
- Manning Wardle 0-6-2T No. 1 'Chevallier' and train arrive at Whipsnade Central Station

Overview
- Headquarters: London
- Locale: England
- Dates of operation: 1970–present

Technical
- Track gauge: 2 ft 6 in (762 mm)
- Length: 2 miles (3.2 km)

The Great Whipsnade Railway, also known as The Jumbo Express, is an English, 2 ft 6 in (762 mm) narrow gauge heritage railway that operates within ZSL Whipsnade Zoo in Bedfordshire, England.

== Overview ==
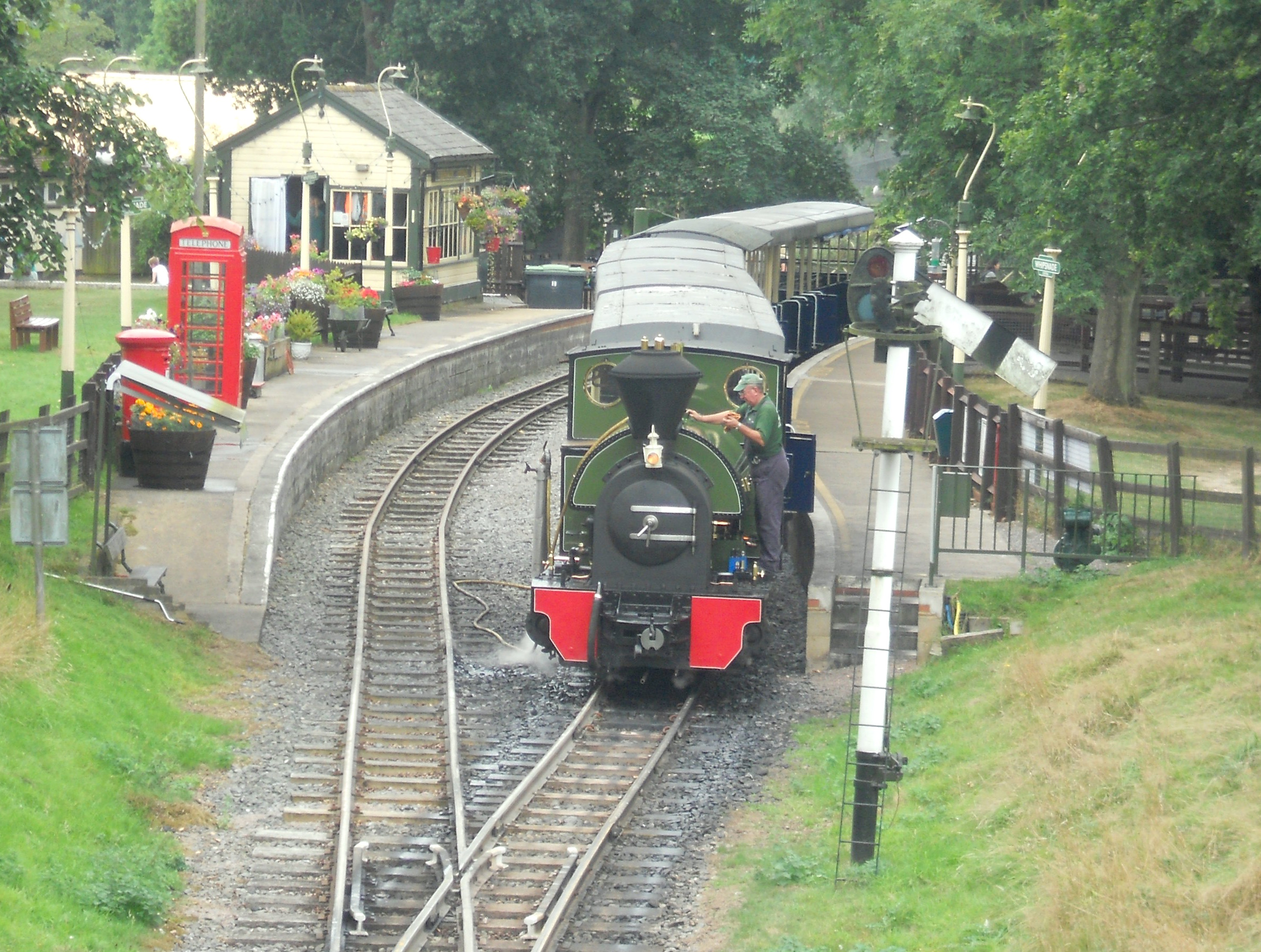
An overview of Whipsnade Central Station sees Kerr Stuart 0-4-2ST Brazil Class No. 2 'Excelsior' and train being prepared for a day's work

Construction of the railway started in 1970 and the initial line opened on 26 August 1970. The line provided rides within the animal enclosures and an additional attraction in its own right. Originally called the Whipsnade and Umfolozi Railway, it began as a short line running from near the children's zoo. It was later extended to form a loop through several paddocks. The railway is now over a mile in length.

The line was built using track and equipment purchased from the Bowaters Paper Railway in Sittingbourne, Kent, which was the last steam-operated narrow-gauge industrial railway in the United Kingdom. The GWR now has four steam and five diesel locomotives. All passenger trains are steam-hauled and services commence at midday, with train departures every half hour with the last train departing Whipsnade Central one hour before Whipsnade Zoo closes for the day.

== The route ==
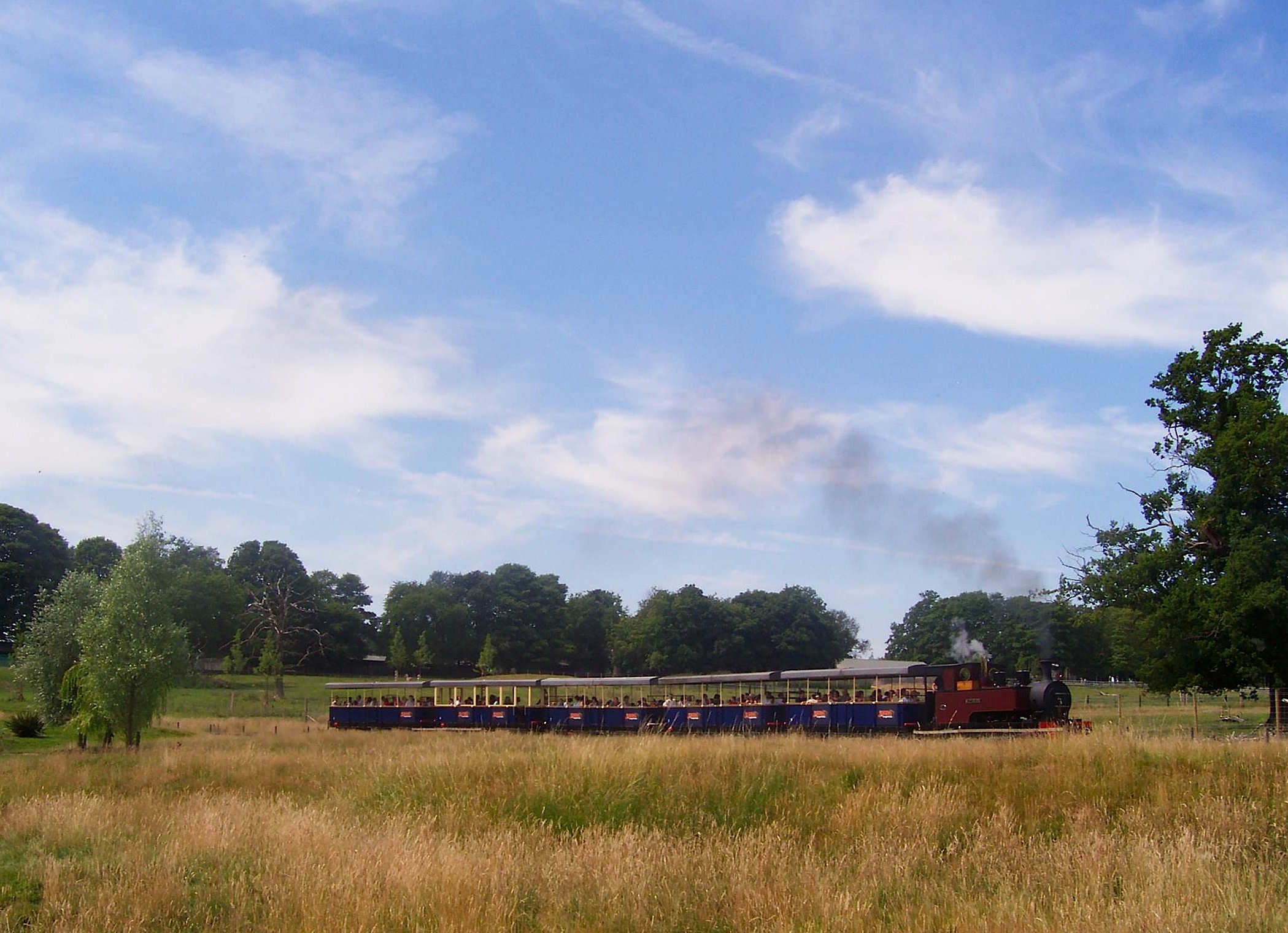
Kerr Stuart 0-6-2T Baretto Class No. 4 'Superior' and train

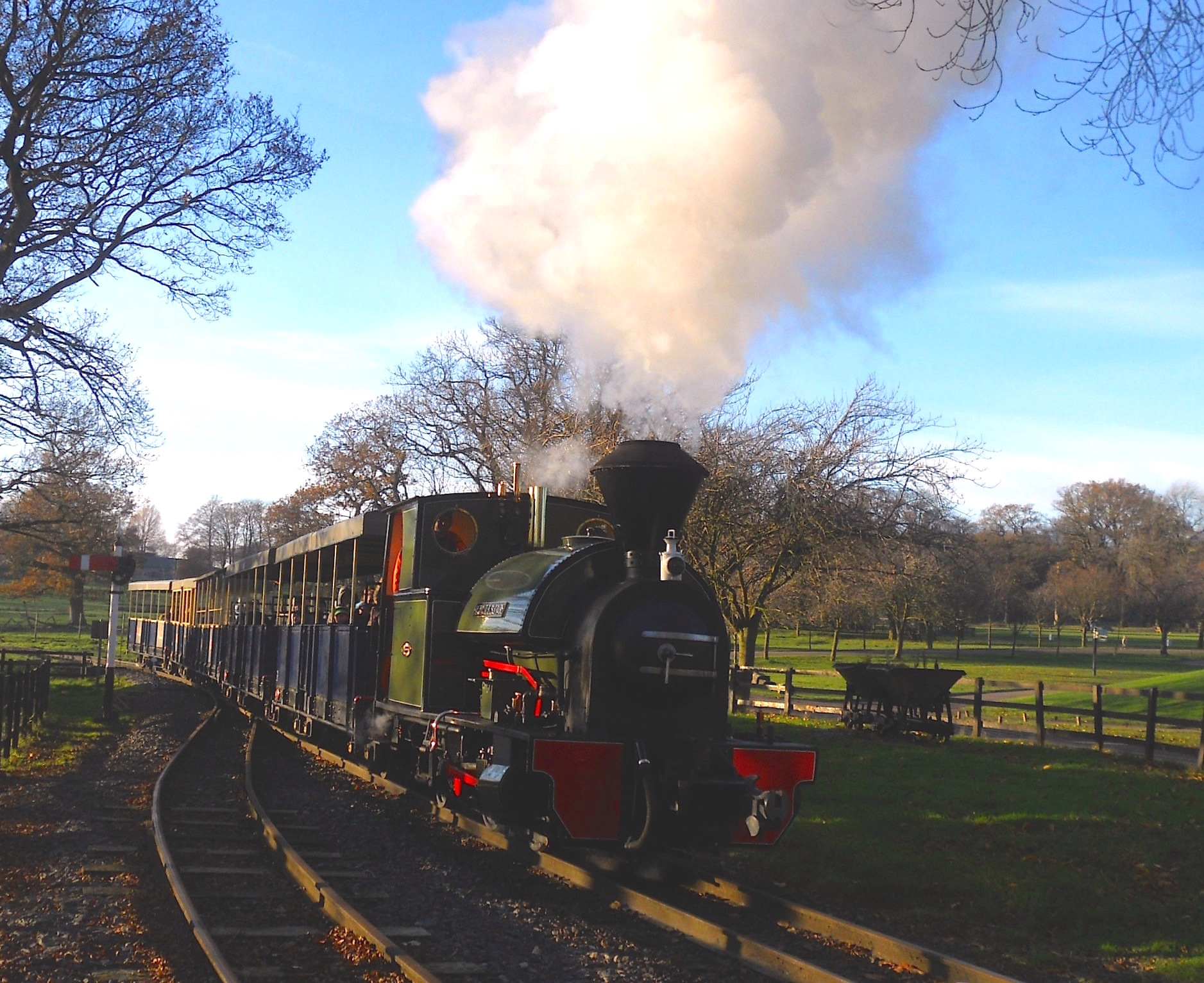
Kerr Stuart 0-4-2ST Brazil Class No. 2 'Excelsior' and her train arrive at Whipsnade Central Station

The railway is a single loop with one station, known Whipsnade Central. Trains normally travel clockwise around the loop. Leaving the station, they travel east under a foot bridge, passing the children's play area and farm on the left. They then cross a road at a level crossing controlled by an automated warning system. The track curves to the right and descends slightly, passing the emu paddock on the right, and the train yard and engine shed on the left.

The track then curves more sharply to the right before straightening and passing the first elephant paddock on the left. The route crosses a wide footpath used to move the elephants between paddocks; this crossing is equipped with barriers. The line passes the elephant and Asian rhino paddocks on the right before crossing another road and entering the Passage through Asia paddocks containing Bactrian Camels, Yak and Pere David Deer.

The track crosses a big ha-ha and turns right, passing through the deer park (also known as Cut throat paddock) and the Przewalski horses on the right. The track slopes downhill before passing through a short tunnel, into the Africa paddock on the left which contains Gemsbok, Ostrich and common Zebra and Lake Daedelus. The track curves more sharply to the right and climbs uphill to a level crossing before reaching the station. This level crossing has gates and is staffed while trains are running.

== Locomotives ==
=== Steam locomotives ===
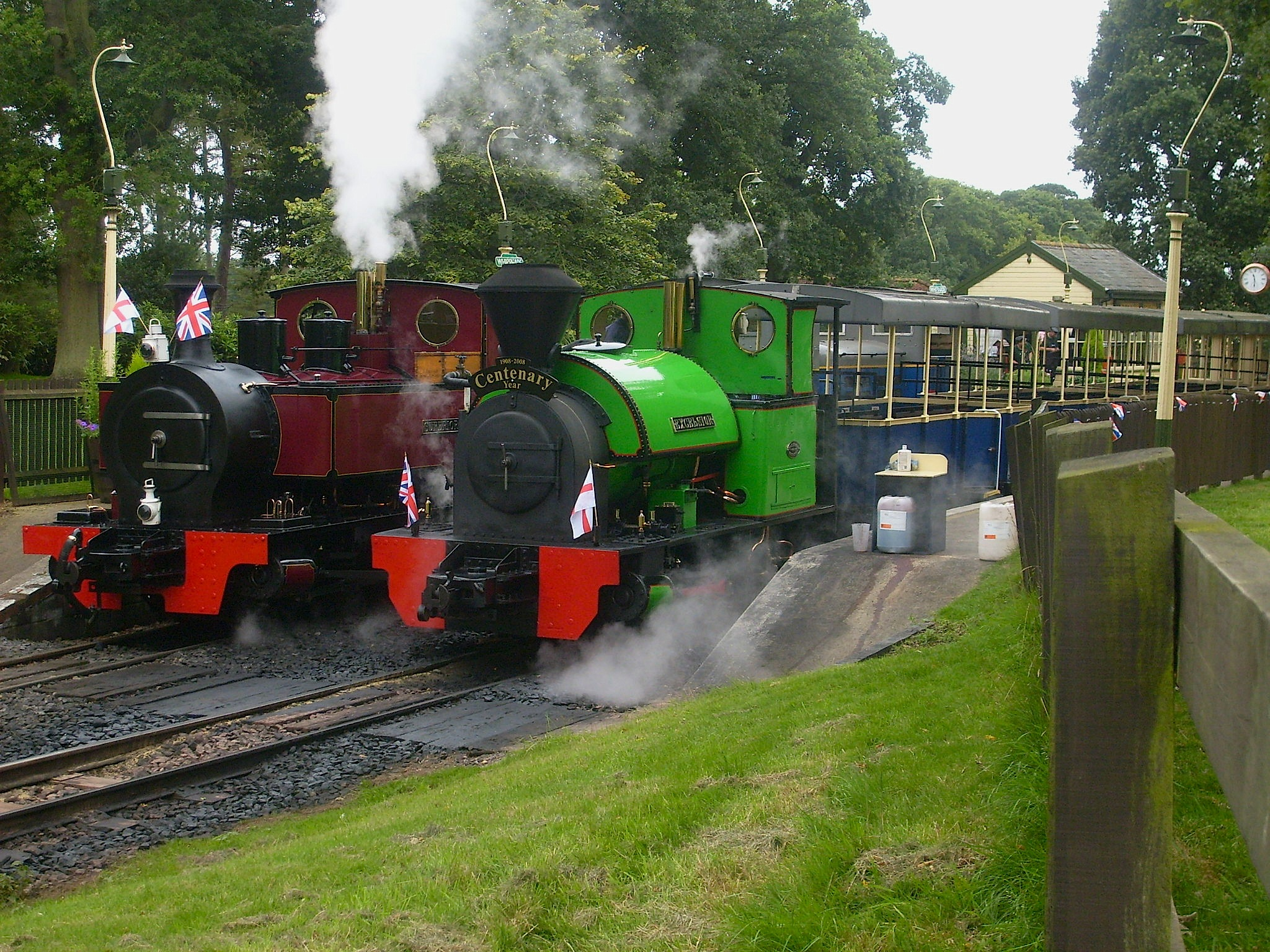
Steam locomotives 'Excelsior' and 'Superior' at Whipsnade Central Station

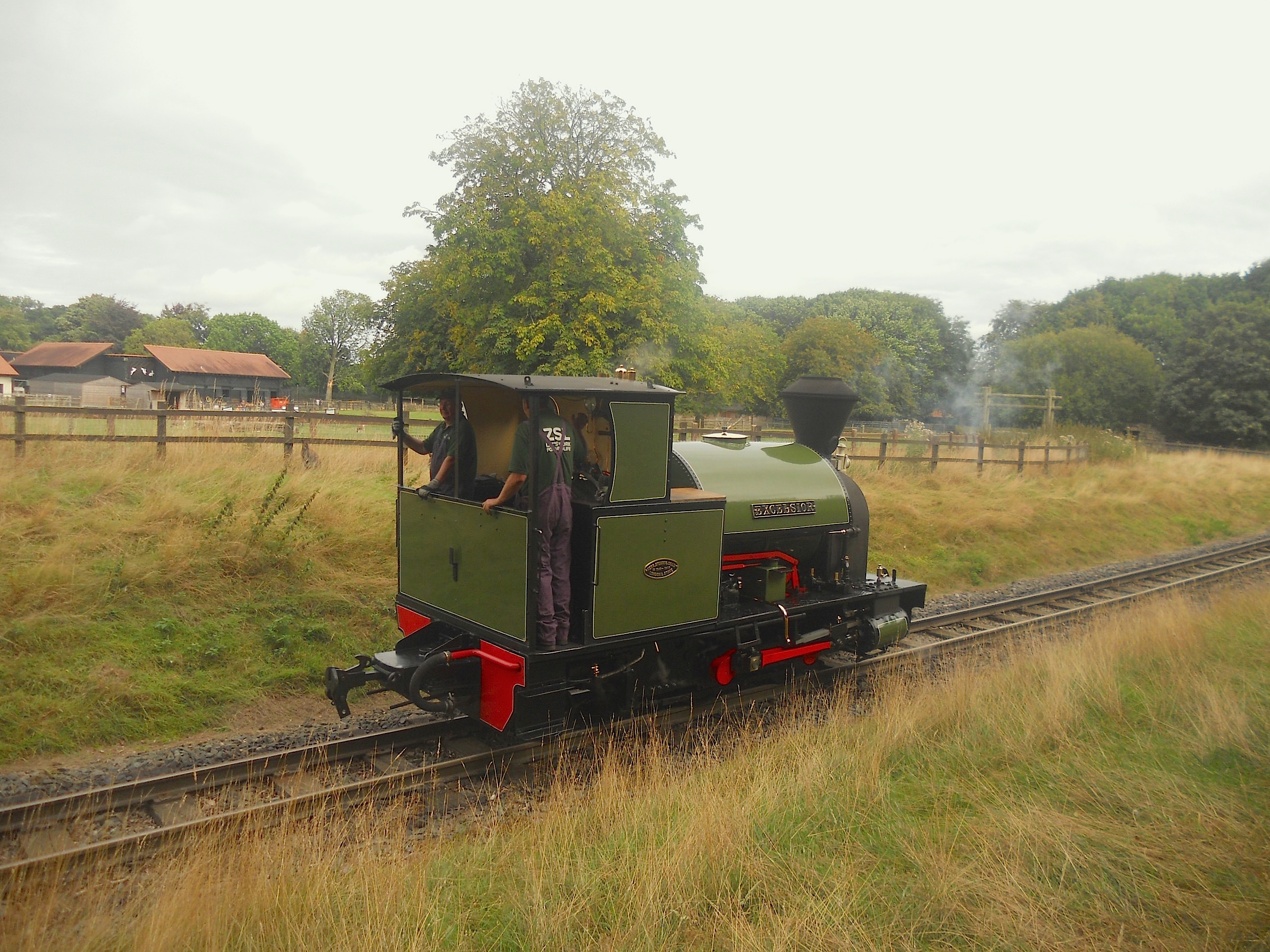
'Excelsior' engine moves light between the yard and Whipsnade Central Station

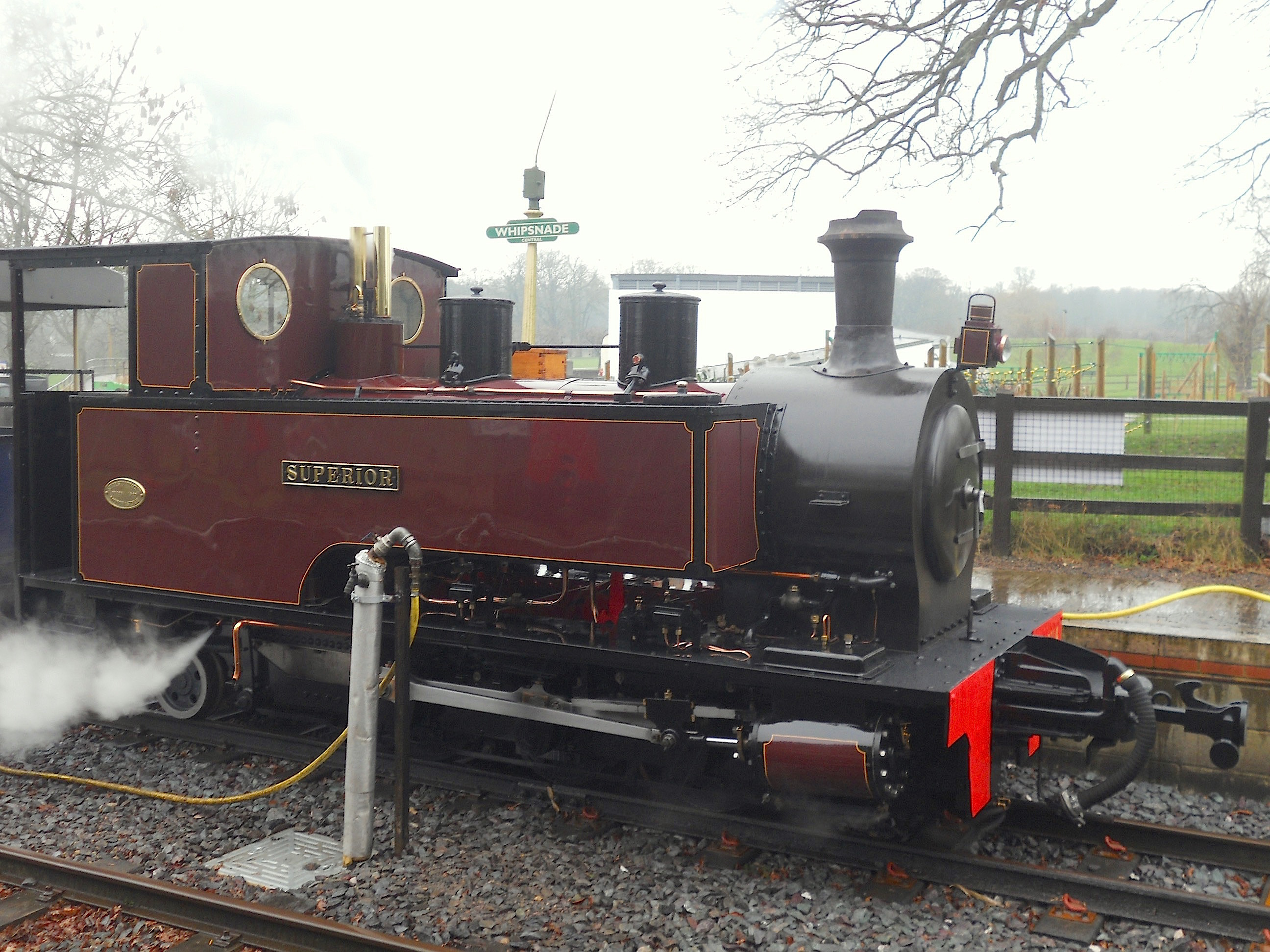
Fresh from a heavy general overhaul rebuild, 'Superior' at Whipsnade Central Station

No.	Name	Builder	Class	Type	Works Number	Built	At GWR	Notes
1	Chevallier	Manning Wardle		0-6-2T	1877	1915	No	Built for the Chattenden and Upnor Railway, purchased by the Bowaters Paper Railway at Sittingbourne in 1950, worked the first passenger train at Whipsnade in 1970. Sold to Bill Parker in 2006.
2	Excelsior	Kerr Stuart	Brazil	0-4-2ST	1049	1908	Yes	Newly built for the Bowaters Paper Railway, arrived at Whipsnade in 1970. Mainly runs during the summer holidays.
3	Conqueror	W.G.Bagnall		0-6-2T	2192	1922	No	Built new for the Bowaters Paper Railway, arrived at Whipsnade in 1970. Sold in 1994. Now part of the Vale of Rheidol Railway Museum collection.
4	Superior	Kerr Stuart	Baretto	0-6-2T	4034	1920	Yes	Built new for the Bowaters Paper Railway, arrived at Whipsnade in 1970.
	Nutty	Sentinel		4wVBT	7701	1929	No	Arrived at Whipsnade in 1991 but never used

=== Diesel locomotives ===
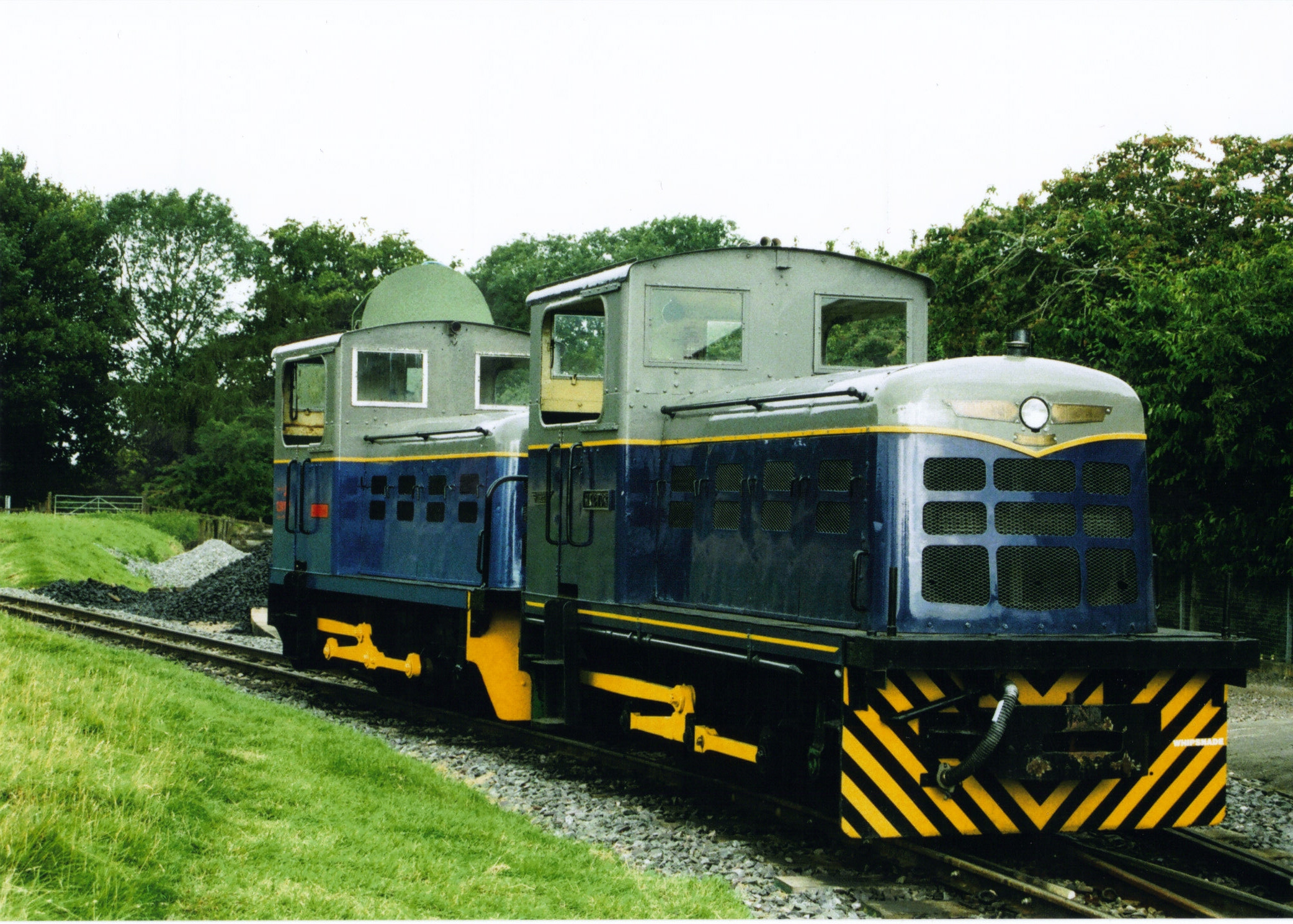
Diesel locomotives Hector and Victor

No.	Name	Builder	Type	Works Number	Built	At GWR	Notes
01	Hercules	FAUR	0-6-0DH	24376		No	Arrived at Whipsnade in 1998. Sold into private ownership in 2007. Scrapped in 2020.
PW3	Sgt Blast	Baguley Drewry	4wDH	3780		Yes	Arrived in 2006 as a replacement for Mr Bill.
8	Victor	John Fowler	0-6-0DM	4160005	1951	Yes	Built for a failed groundnuts scheme in Africa, sold to British Portland Cement Co.'s works at Lower Penarth, Glamorgan. Sold to the Welshpool and Llanfair Light Railway in 1968, arrived at Whipsnade in 1972.
9	Hector	John Fowler	0-6-0DM	4160004	1951	Yes	Built for a failed groundnuts scheme, sold to British Portland Cement Co.'s Lower Penarth works. Sold to the Welsh Highland Railway in 1968, arrived at Whipsnade in 1975.
10	Mr. Bill	Ruston Hornsby	4wDM	221625	1944	No	Built for the Royal Navy Armaments Depot Broughton Moor military railway. Arrived at Whipsnade in 1992.sold in 2006. Now in private ownership. Named after Sir William McAlpine.
5	Edward Lloyd	Ruston Hornsby	4wDM	435403	1961	No	Built for the Nettleton Top iron ore mines. Arrived at Whipsnade in 1970. Sold to the Sittingbourne & Kemsley Light Railway in 1972.
6	L117	Motor Rail	4wDM	5060	1935	No	Built as a 3 ft (914 mm) gauge locomotive for the London Brick Company. Arrived at Whipsnade in 1971. Sold in 1983 to Alan Keef.
6.1	L115	Motor Rail	4wDM	5605	1931	No	Arrived at Whipsnade in 1971. Sold in 1983 to Alan Keef.
6.2	L116	Motor Rail	4wDM	5606	1931	No	Arrived At Whipsnade in 1971. Sold in 1983 to Alan Keef.

=== Battery Locomotives ===
No.	Name	Builder	Type	Works Number	Built	At GWR	Notes
7		Wingrove & Rogers	4wBE	1397	1938	No	Arrived At Whipsnade in 1971. Sold in 1983 to Alan Keef.
7.1		Wingrove & Rogers	4wBE	1398	1938	No	Arrived At Whipsnade in 1971. Sold in 1983 to Alan Keef.
7.2		Wingrove & Rogers	4wBE	1399	1938	No	Arrived At Whipsnade in 1971. Sold in 1983 to Alan Keef.
7.3		Wingrove & Rogers	4wBE	1400	1938	No	Arrived At Whipsnade in 1971. since scrapped

== See also ==
- British narrow gauge railways
- Umfolozi River
- Hluhluwe-Umfolozi Game Reserve
