= Amerton Railway =

Narrow gauge railway in England

Coordinates: 52.8479°N 2.0105°W

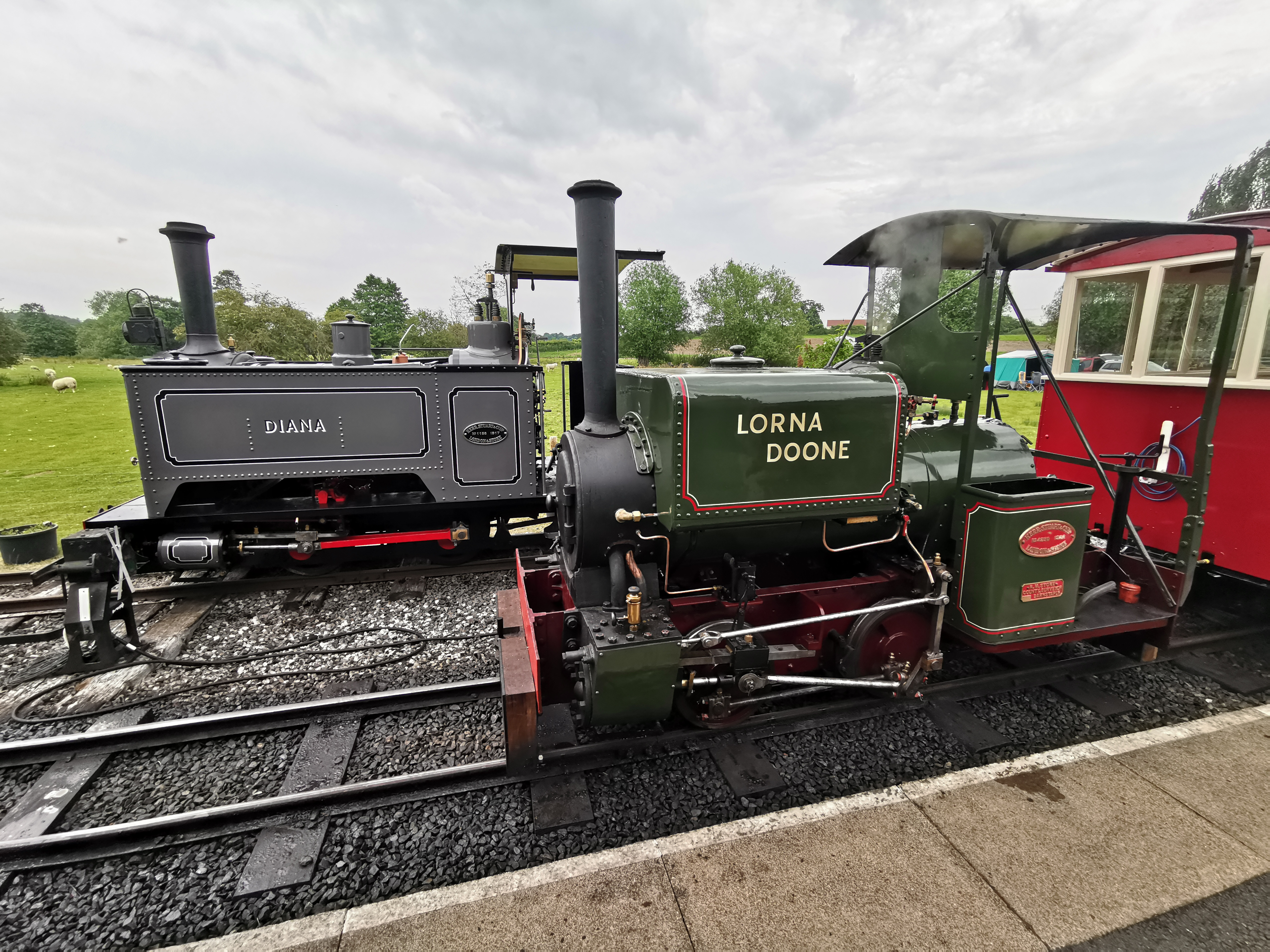
- Amerton Railway. Kerr, Stuart 4250 of 1922 0-4-0ST 'Lorna Doone' and Kerr, Stuart 1158 of 1917 0-4-0T 'Diana' in June 2019

Overview
- Operator: Staffordshire Narrow Gauge Railway Limited
- Stations called at: Amerton, Chartley Halt
- Headquarters: Amerton
- Locale: England
- Dates of operation: 1992–present

Technical
- Track gauge: 2 ft (610 mm)
- Length: 1 mile (1.6 km)
- Operating speed: 10 miles per hour (16.1 km/h)

Other
- Website: https://www.amertonrailway.co.uk

The Amerton Railway is a 2 ft (610 mm) narrow gauge heritage railway in the English county of Staffordshire. It is owned by Staffordshire Narrow Gauge Railway Limited, a registered charity, and operated by volunteers.

Construction of the railway started in 1990 in a field at the side of Amerton Working Farm. The first trains ran in 1992, but it was around 10 years later when the railway was completed as a full circle with two passing loops. The collection of locomotives is primarily focused around those that were either built or operated in Staffordshire.

== Development of the line ==
There is the main 3 road running shed housing majority of the locomotives, operational and stored, a large workshop next door where restoration and maintenance take place, then a small covered siding is located between the workshop and carriage shed.

In May 2012, the 17 acres (6.9 ha) of land on which the railway is run was purchased by the railway, securing the future of operations at Amerton.

On 10 August 2001 the railway was very fortunate to acquire the Leek and Manifold Valley Light Railway/North Staffordshire Railway (The Knotty)/ LMS Signal Box from Waterhouses Station, which was opened in 1905, and was extended to allow for the additional controls for the opening of the Leek and Manifold Valley Light Railway. The signal box closed in 1943. This controlled both the narrow gauge and standard gauge lines at Waterhouses. In 2022, after the restoration of the signal box was completed, it was awarded joint winner of the Hendy and Pendle Trust Volunteers Award at the National Railway Heritage Awards.

A comprehensive industrial demonstration railway is now being developed from the old phase 1 stump siding area. So far additional wagon storage space and a turning triangle have been installed.

A demonstration mine and blacksmith workshop has also been constructed along with a few mine wagons to resemble an old gypsum mine that used to operate not far from where the railway is today.

== Rolling stock ==
Restoration is in progress on a number of narrow gauge wagons. The railway owns nine RNAD wagons. A set of three RNAD box vans and six RNAD flat wagons, or "flats". The vans and three flats have been converted from 2 ft 6 in track gauge and to run on the line, with one van three flats been fully restored, one of these flats has been rebuilt into a ballast wagon ("Minnow", a nod to the British Rail ballast wagons with fish related names, such as the "Dogfish") the later three flats had recently arrived from Chasewater Railway. The wheelsets and frames are currently separated, with the 2 ft 6 in wheelsets currently in Amerton Yard, and the frames up at "stump siding". These are to be restored when time and finances allow. Three ex- RAF Fauld drop-side wagons have been restored and painted in RAF colours during 2016, as well as two ex-MOD flats, one rebuilt to a short sided wagon, the other to the original MOD high end sided flats. There are also several Allens skips, which have recently been taken off from mainline running, due to bucket deterioration, and the wheelsets being set for 600 mm (1 ft 11 5/8 in) gauge, meaning they would derail at times.

=== Locomotives ===
Name	Builder	Type	Date	Works number	Status	Information	Image
Isabel	W.G. Bagnall	0-4-0ST	1897	1491	Operational	Built for the Cliffe Hill Mineral Railway, before being displayed on a plinth outside of W.G Bagnalls in Stafford, then outside Stafford station, before being restored. Major overhaul, including a new boiler, from 2006 to 2008 and overhauled again in 2018. Fully operational.	
Lorna Doone	Kerr Stuart	0-4-0ST	1922	4250	Operational	A Kerr Stuart Wren class. Originally ordered by R. H. Neal & Co Ltd for use on the southern Arterial Road and eastern bypass in Essex. When that work was completed, R. M. Stone was given £500 by Devon County Council to purchase one Wren from the auctioneer T. W. Ward, he was able to secure two for £250 each (and later bought several more) which were sent to Beacon Down Quarry near Parracombe. Here she received the name ‘‘Lorna Doone’’. After a career in Devon, she was later purchased by Max Sinclair and then sold on to Les Lamb in 1960, before being displayed in Thinktank, Birmingham Science Museum. Arrived at Amerton in 2003, Restoration back to steam began in 2010 was completed in 2018.	Kerr, Stuart & Co. No. 4250 "Lorna Doone" seen at Amerton Railway
Diana	Kerr Stuart	0-4-0T	1917	1158	Under Overhaul	Actually built in 1909 but sold in 1917 to the Kerry Tramway, preserved in 1964 and restored in 2015. Out of service and undegoing a 10-yearly boiler overhaul as of 2026.	
Gordon	Hunslet	4wDH	1978	8561	Operational	Built for the National Coal Board's Allerton Bywater Colliery, and later worked at Castlebridge Colliery in Scotland. Reportedly found upside-down in a scrapyard in Fife. Fitted with a 3-cylinder Perkins 3.152. Arrived at Amerton in 1996. In service, a regular on passenger trains.	
The Littleton Ruston (unofficial name)	Ruston and Hornsby	4wDM	1964	506491	Operational	Built for the 2 ft 6 in (762 mm) narrow gauge National Coal Board South Staffordshire Collieries. Worked overground at Littleton Colliery and is one of a pair of locomotives preserved, the other is stored off-site. Fitted with a 2-cylinder Ruston 2YDAL. Arrived at Amerton in 1992. Operational as the main yard shunter.	
501	Motor Rail	4wDM	1975	40SD501	Operational	Built for the Severn Trent Water Authority's Minworth Sewage Works. Fitted with 3 cylinder Deutz engine. Arrived at Amerton in 1991. Operational.	
A10	Baguley-Drewry	4wDH	1984	3782	Operational	Built for RNAD Trecwn. Fitted with 6 cylinder Perkins 6.354 engine. Arrived at Amerton in 2018. Operational and occasionally used on passenger trains.	
The Deutz (Unofficial Name)	Deutz	4wDM	1937	19531	Operational	Worked on a sugar mill at Coucy-le-Chateau, France, before being imported to the UK, arrived at Amerton in 2009 where it was stripped and restored to full working order for 2014, operates the occasional passenger train .	
Dorman	Motor Rail	4wDM	1940	7471	Operational	Built for Hussey, Egan & Pickmere Ltd, Birmingham. Fitted with 2 cylinder Dorman 2DWD Diesel engine. Arrived at Amerton in 1991. Used only on demonstration trains.	
Yard No. 70	Ruston and Hornsby	4wDM	1943	221623	Operational	Built for the 2 ft 6 in (762 mm) narrow gauge Chattenden and Upnor Railway. Fitted with a Ruston 4VRO. Arrived at Amerton in 1992. Returned to service in 2019 following being out of action for twenty years due to a failed engine.	
SP90	Clayton Equipment Company	4wBE	1974	B0402C	Operational	4Te 120V 21 hp Clayton battery locomotive on fixed 610mm gauge (Upgraded with additional features/ weight added) – fitted with original ‘camtactor’ controller. The loco has retrofitted driver protection, electromagnetic deadman brake, speedometer, additional lighting etc.	
SP972	Clayton Equipment Company	4wBE	1990	B3686A / 72292/1	Operational	6Te 140V Clayton ‘Cairo’ battery locos on fixed 610mm gauge (This is an upgraded 5.5Te loco with additional features/ weight added) – fitted with original ‘camtactor’ controller. The loco has retrofitted driver protection, electromagnetic deadman brake, speedometer, additional lighting etc. In service but used infrequently.	
Dreadnought	Baguley Cars Ltd	0-4-0DM (steam outline)	1939	3024	Under Overhaul	Built for Wilson's Pleasure Railway, Allhallows-on-Sea, Kent. Fitted with 3 cylinder Lister SR3. Arrived at Amerton in 1991. Major gearbox overhaul in 1999. Original mainline diesel Locomotive, until the completion of Hunslet 'Gordon', and now used infrequently on passenger services but runs for special occasions. Has undergone a complete overhaul and is expected to return to service in late 2026.	
Golspie	Baguley Cars Ltd	0-4-0DM (steam outline)	1935	2085	Under Overhaul	Built for Trentham Gardens. Later stored at Alton Towers for possible use on Alton Towers Narrow Gauge Railway. Fitted with a 4-cylinder Perkins 4.270. Arrived at Amerton in 2000. Restoration to working order started in 2012, and moved under her own power in October 2016. Restoration is recommencing as of 2026.	
No. 1	W.G. Bagnall	0-4-0ST	1911	1889	In Storage	Worked at Judkins Quarry before being sold to BR and working at a sleeper works in Beeston. Stored outside for years in Didcot, arrived in 2008 with a new boiler and firebox wrapper and a kit of parts, in need of Major restoration. Currently stored inside.	
	F. C. Hibberd & Co.	4wDM	1937	2025	Under Overhaul	Bought by Gravelworks Ltd for the Preston Irwell Valley Water Board. Preserved at Gloddfa Ganol until 1998. Fitted with a 2-cylinder Lister CE. Restoration in progress.	
	Henschel	0-8-0T	1916	526	Under Overhaul	Built for the German trench railways. Spent most of its working life at the Sena Sugar Estate, Mozambique. Now under restoration.	
Jung	Arnold Jung Lokomotivfabrik	0-4-0DM	1934	5869	In Storage	EL105 type, supplied through Standard Steel in 1934 to a British customer, missing its original Jung single cylinder engine and all the bodywork.	

=== Previous Locomotives ===
Paddy	Wilbrighton Works	0-4-0VBT+T	2007	2	No longer resident	Built by a group in a garden from scratch using parts from a steam crane and others. Was sold after its 10 yearly overhaul in 2014, Now at Statfold Barn Railway
Jennie	Hunslet	0-4-0ST	2008	3905	No longer resident	New build Kerr Stuart Wren class built by Hunslet. Operational, overhaul completed in 2020. Now based at the Moseley Railway Trust.
No. 774	Baguley Cars Ltd	0-4-0PM	1919	774	No longer resident	Worked on the Timber Supply Department tramway at Pennal. On loan from the Narrow Gauge Railway Museum for a cosmetic restoration. Left Amerton on 21 November 2008 for display at the Statfold Barn Railway. Moved again in 2012 back to the Narrow Gauge Railway Museum where it is now on display.

== See also ==
- British narrow gauge railways
