= Catende =

Municipality of Pernambuco, Brazil

- Municipality of Pernambuco, Brazil
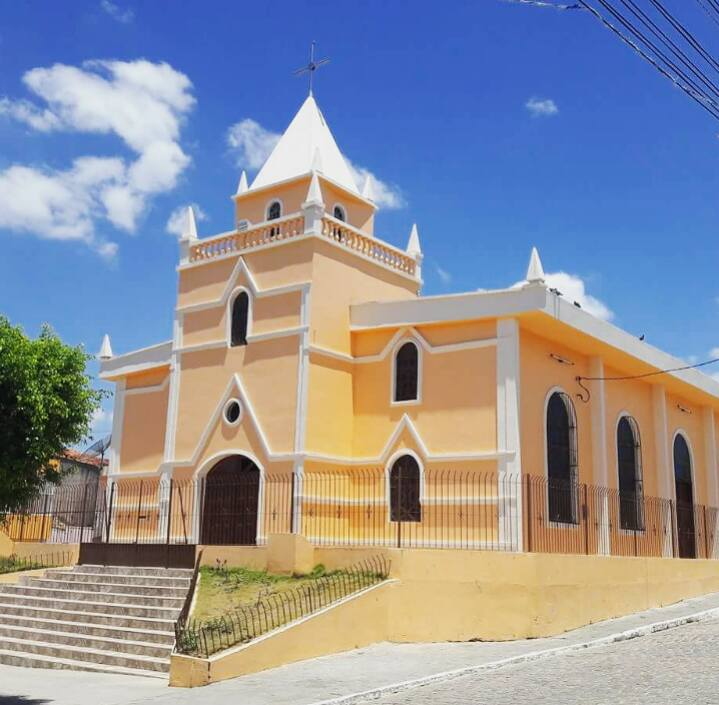
- Church of Saint Vincent Ferrer

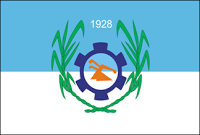
- Flag

- Location of Catende in Pernambuco

- Location within Brazil Location within South America
- Coordinates: 8°40′1″S 35°43′1″W
- Country: Brazil
- Region: Northeast
- State: Pernambuco
- Founded: 11 September 1928

Government
  - Mayor: Gracina Maria Ramos Braz da Silva (PSDB) (2025-2028)
  - Vice Mayor: Jose Rinaldo Fernandes de Barros (PV) (2025-2028)

Area
  - Total: 208.594 km^{2} (80.539 sq mi)
- Elevation: 168 m (551 ft)

Population (2022 Census)
  - Total: 32,156
  - Estimate (2025): 33,086
  - Density: 154.16/km^{2} (399.3/sq mi)
- Demonym: Catendense (Brazilian Portuguese)
- Time zone: UTC-03:00 (Brasília Time)
- Postal code: 55400-000, 55401-000, 55402-000
- HDI (2010): 0.609 – medium
- Website: catende.pe.gov.br

Catende (Central northeastern portuguese pronunciation: [kɐˈtẽdi]) is a Brazilian municipality in the state of Pernambuco. Its estimated population in 2020 was 43,340 inhabitants in a total area of 207.24 km^{2}. The economy is based on the cultivation of sugarcane and the production of derived products (sugar and ethanol). Catende used to have the world's largest sugar mill.

== Geography ==
- State - Pernambuco
- Region - Zona da mata Pernambucana
- Boundaries - Bonito (N); Palmares (E); Maraial and Jaqueira (S); Belém de Maria (W)
- Area - 206.92 km^{2}
- Elevation - 168 m
- Hydrography - Una river
- Vegetation - Subperenifólia forest
- Climate - Hot tropical and humid
- Annual average temperature - 24.8 c
- Distance to Recife - 137 km

== Economy ==
The main economic activities in Catende are based in industry, commerce and agribusiness especially sugarcane and cattle.

=== Economic Indicators ===
Population	GDP x(1000 R$).	GDP pc (R$)	PE
35.251	116.847	3.490	0.194%

Economy by Sector

Primary sector	Secondary sector	Service sector
4.99%	23.62%	71.39%

=== Health Indicators ===
HDI (2000)	Hospitals (2007)	Hospitals beds (2007)	Children's Mortality every 1000 (2005)
0.644	1	25	39.1

== See also ==
- List of municipalities in Pernambuco
