= São José da Laje =

Municipality in Alagoas, Brazil

- Municipality of Alagoas, Brazil
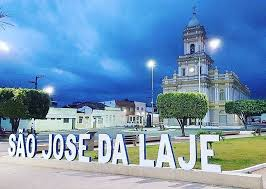
- Saint Joseph Parish church

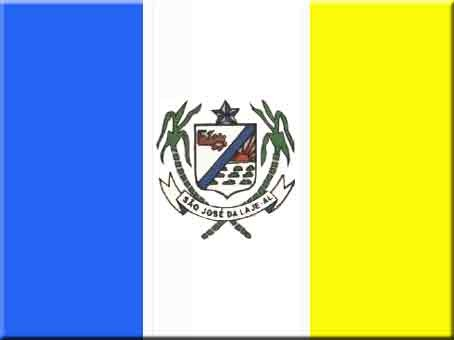
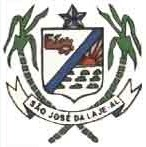
- Flag Coat of arms

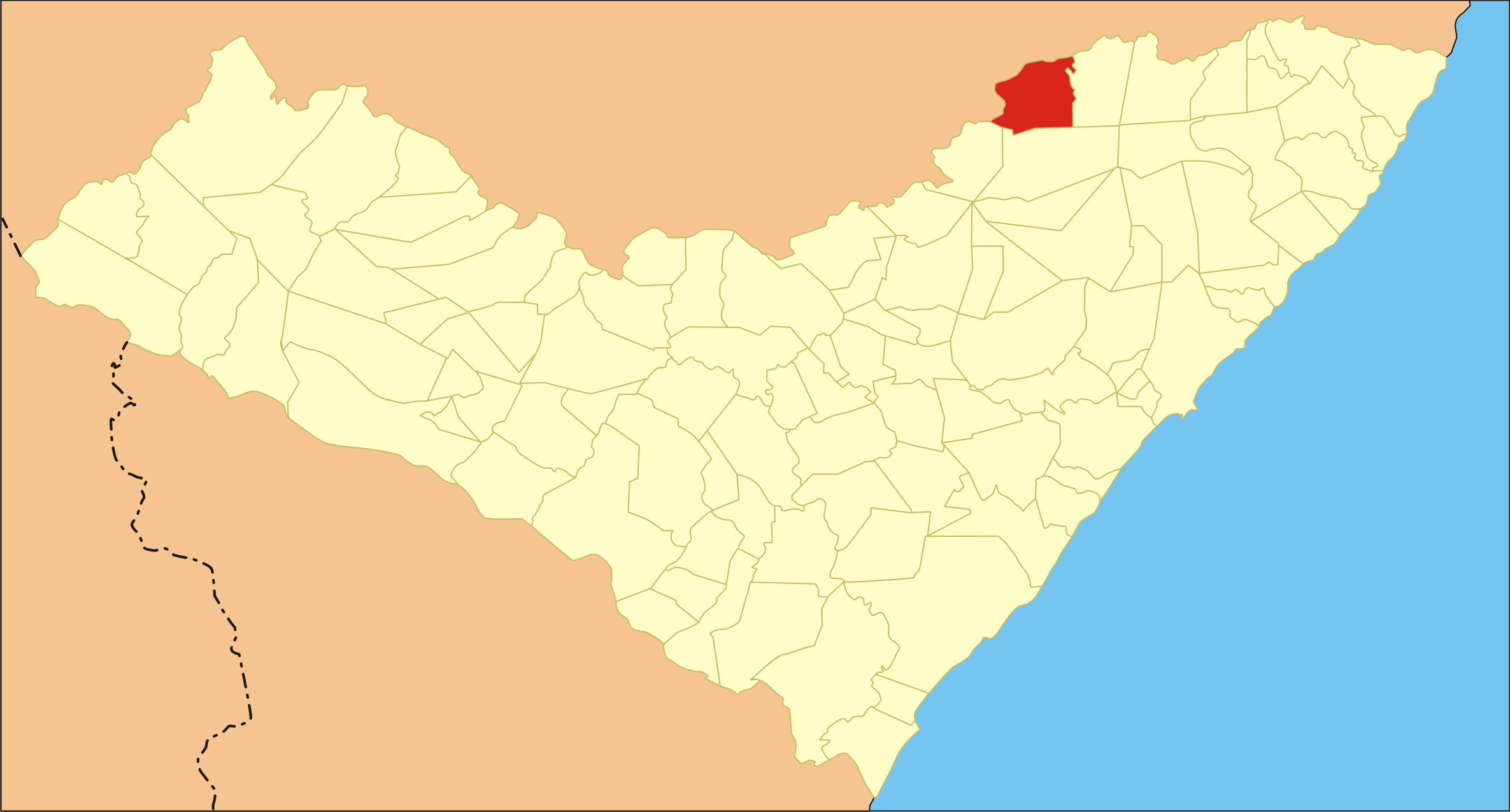
- Location of São José da Laje in Alagoas

- Location within Brazil Location within South America
- Coordinates: 9°0′36″S 36°3′28″W
- Country: Brazil
- Region: Northeast
- State: Alagoas
- Founded: 16 June 1920

Government
  - Mayor: Angela Vanessa Rocha Pereira Bezerra (MDB) (2025-2028)
  - Vice Mayor: Ravena Grazyelle Valença Caldeira de Araújo (MDB) (2025-2028)

Area
  - Total: 256.603 km^{2} (99.075 sq mi)
- Elevation: 256 m (840 ft)

Population (2022)
  - Total: 20,813
  - Density: 81.11/km^{2} (210.1/sq mi)
- Demonym: Lajense (Brazilian Portuguese)
- Time zone: UTC-03:00 (Brasília Time)
- Postal code: 57860-000
- HDI (2010): 0.573 – medium
- Website: saojosedalaje.al.gov.br

São José da Laje (Central northeastern portuguese pronunciation: [ˈsɐ̃w ʒuˈzɛ ˈdɐ ˈlaʒi]) is a municipality located in the western of the Brazilian state of Alagoas. Its population was 23,996 (2020) and its area is 265 km^{2}.

== See also ==
- List of municipalities in Alagoas
