= Maraial =

Municipality of Pernambuco, Brazil

- City
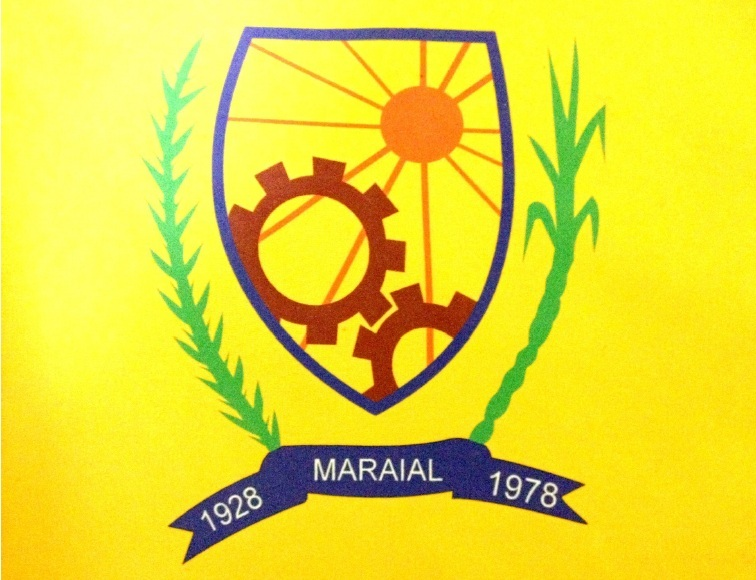
- Flag

- Maraial located in Brazil Map
- Coordinates: 8°48′10″S 35°49′44″W
- Country: Brazil
- State: Pernambuco
- Region: Zona da mata

Area
  - Total: 192.25 km^{2} (74.23 sq mi)
- Elevation: 212 m (696 ft)

Population (2022 Census)
  - Total: 9,359
  - Estimate (2025): 9,322
- Time zone: UTC−3 (BRT)

Maraial (Central northeastern portuguese pronunciation: [mɐɾɐjˈɐw]) is a city in Pernambuco, Brazil. It is located in Zona da mata Pernambucana, 154 km from the state capital, Recife.

== Geography ==
- State - Pernambuco
- Region - Zona da mata Pernambucana
- Boundaries - Jaqueira (N); Alagoas state (S); Xexéu and Catende (E); São Benedito do Sul (W)
- Area - 192.25 km^{2}
- Elevation - 212 m
- Hydrography - Una river
- Vegetation - Subperenifólia forest
- Climate - Hot tropical and humid
- Annual average temperature - 23.6 c
- Distance to Recife - 154 km

== Economy ==
The main economic activities in Maraial are based in food and beverage industry and agribusiness, especially sugarcane, bananas, pineapples, cattle and goats.

=== Economic Indicators ===
Population	GDP x(1000 R$).	GDP pc (R$)	PE
12.303	56.715	4.592	0.09%

Economy by Sector (2006)

Primary sector	Secondary sector	Service sector
10.64%	26.05%	63.31%

=== Health Indicators ===
HDI (2000)	Hospitals (2007)	Hospitals beds (2007)	Children's Mortality every 1000 (2005)
0.564	1	13	30.8

== See also ==
- List of municipalities in Pernambuco
