= Industrial steam locomotive =

Type of locomotive

An industrial steam locomotive is a type of steam locomotive which primarily ran on industrial railways to serve a company by transporting or assisting the manufacturing products of that particular company's produce. Industrial railways often transported items such as coal, iron, slate and workers to aid production. In many countries, industrial steam serving coal mines in particular, lasted significantly longer than the nations otherwise mainline steam traction, due to the readily available fuel.

== UK ==
The United Kingdom is known for its widespread use of internal and external railways of many different gauges. The most common industrial gauge in the UK was standard gauge. This used 4 ft 8 1/2 the most common gauge throughout the world.

== Common motive power ==
- Steam locomotive
- Diesel locomotive
- Electric locomotive

=== Notable builders ===
- Avonside Engine Company
- Andrew Barclay Sons & Co.
- Edward Borrows and Sons
- Brush Traction
- English Electric
- George England and Company
- Hawthorn Leslie and Company
- Hudswell Clarke
- Hunslet Engine Company
- Kerr, Stuart and Company
- Kitson and Company
- Manning Wardle
- North British Locomotive Company
- Peckett and Sons
- Robert Stephenson and Hawthorns
- Robert Stephenson and Company
- Sentinel Waggon Works
- W. G. Bagnall
- Vulcan Foundry
- Yorkshire Engine Company

=== Notable Locomotive Designs ===
- Bagnall 0-4-0ST "Alfred" and "Judy"
- Bagnall 0-6-0ST Victor/Vulcan
- Hunslet Austerity 0-6-0ST
- Peckett OQ Class
