= Polar Bear (steam locomotive) =

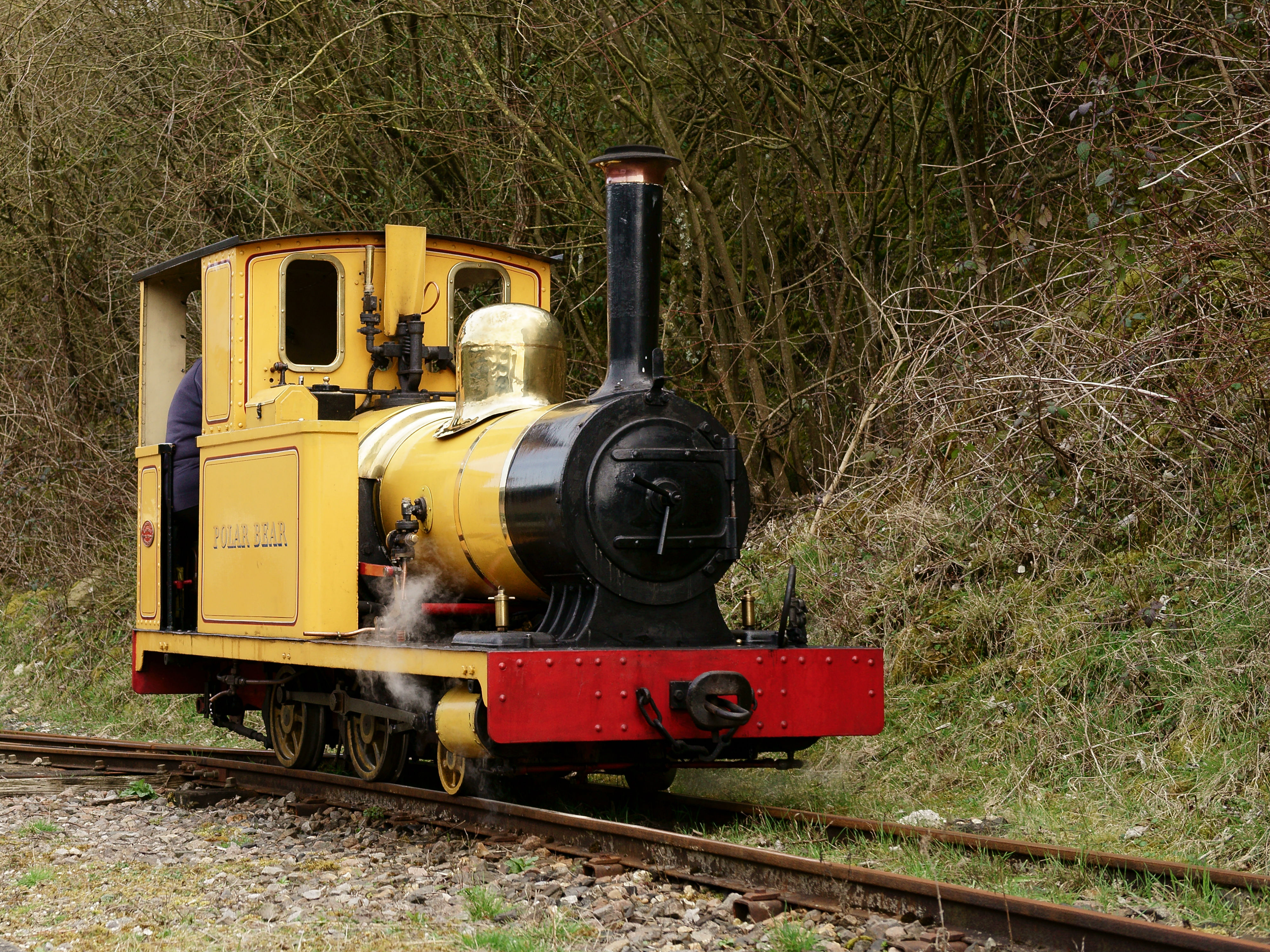
- Polar Bear at Amberley Museum Railway
Type and origin
- Power type: Steam
- Designer: William Gordon Bagnall
- Builder: W. G. Bagnall & Co., Stafford
- Serial number: 1781
- Build date: 1905
Specifications
- Configuration
  - Whyte: 2-4-0T
- Gauge: 2 ft
- Boiler pressure: 120 psi (0.83 MPa)
- Cylinders: Two
- Cylinder size: 4.5 in bore x 7.5 in stroke
- Loco brake: Hand
- Train brakes: Air
Performance figures
- Maximum speed: 15 mph (24 km/h)
- Tractive effort: 1,463 lbf
Career
- Operators: Groudle Glen Railway
- Withdrawn: 1962
- Restored: 1979–1982
- Disposition: Preserved at Amberley Museum & Heritage Centre

Polar Bear is a narrow-gauge steam locomotive built in 1905 by W. G. Bagnall for the Groudle Glen Railway. It is now preserved and runs on the Amberley Museum Railway.

== Preservation ==
Polar Bear in motion

Polar Bear was sold to the Brockham Museum Trust in 1967. In 1982 it passed, with the rest of the Brockham collection, to the Amberley Museum Railway, where it was returned to traffic in 1983. Polar Bear's boiler was condemned around 1988, returning to service with a new boiler in 1993. Its boiler certificate expired at the end of 2010; with a retube and work on the firebox being required before a return to service. Since being based at Amberley, Polar Bear has returned to the Groudle Glen on three occasions (1993, 1996 and 2005) to visit.

Polar Bear was stripped down for overhaul in early 2011. The boiler was moved to Chatham for overhaul, with mechanical work being undertaken in-house at Amberley. The boiler was returned to Amberley in January 2012. Polar Bear was relaunched on 13 July 2013 by BBC newsreader and railway enthusiast Nicholas Owen.

Polar Bear made its fourth visit to the Groudle Glen Railway since it was preserved in late July 2016. After its two week stay there, it returned home to Amberley museum.

== Brown Bear ==
In January 2013 the Groudle Glen Railway announced a plan to construct a new locomotive to be named Brown Bear. Brown Bear will be built using the original Bagnall drawings for Polar Bear (Works No. 1781 of 1905) which have largely survived. Once complete the locomotive will operate alongside the older Sea Lion, allowing the railway to accurately represent the period from 1905 through until the outbreak of World War II, when these locomotives would have been used together daily during the busy summer months.

Polar Bear was an updated and more powerful version of Sea Lion incorporating several modifications. Some of these, such as the change from Baguley's modified valve gear to Bagnall Price gear, can be attributed to changes in key personnel at Bagnall's; others, such as the larger-bore cylinders, increased grate area and increased driving wheel diameter were likely based on the nine years of experience with Sea Lion. The most obvious visible difference between the two is the change from round to rectangular spectacle plates in the front cab sheet, which improved the forward vision for the driver.

As Polar Bear was the last locomotive ordered by the original railway company and is arguably a more advanced design, Brown Bear will be built as close to Polar Bear's design as reasonably possible. The original locomotives made extensive use of cast components, and while the new build will use castings where patterns are already available, some one-off components will be fabricated.

Assuming that major components will be manufactured off-site by a series of specialist firms before being brought to Groudle for assembly, the build's total cost is expected to be about £50,000, with completion expected within five years.
