= W.G Bagnall 0-6-0ST "New Standard 18" =

Class of saddle tank locomotives built by Bagnall

W.G. Bagnall 0-6-0ST "New Standard 18"
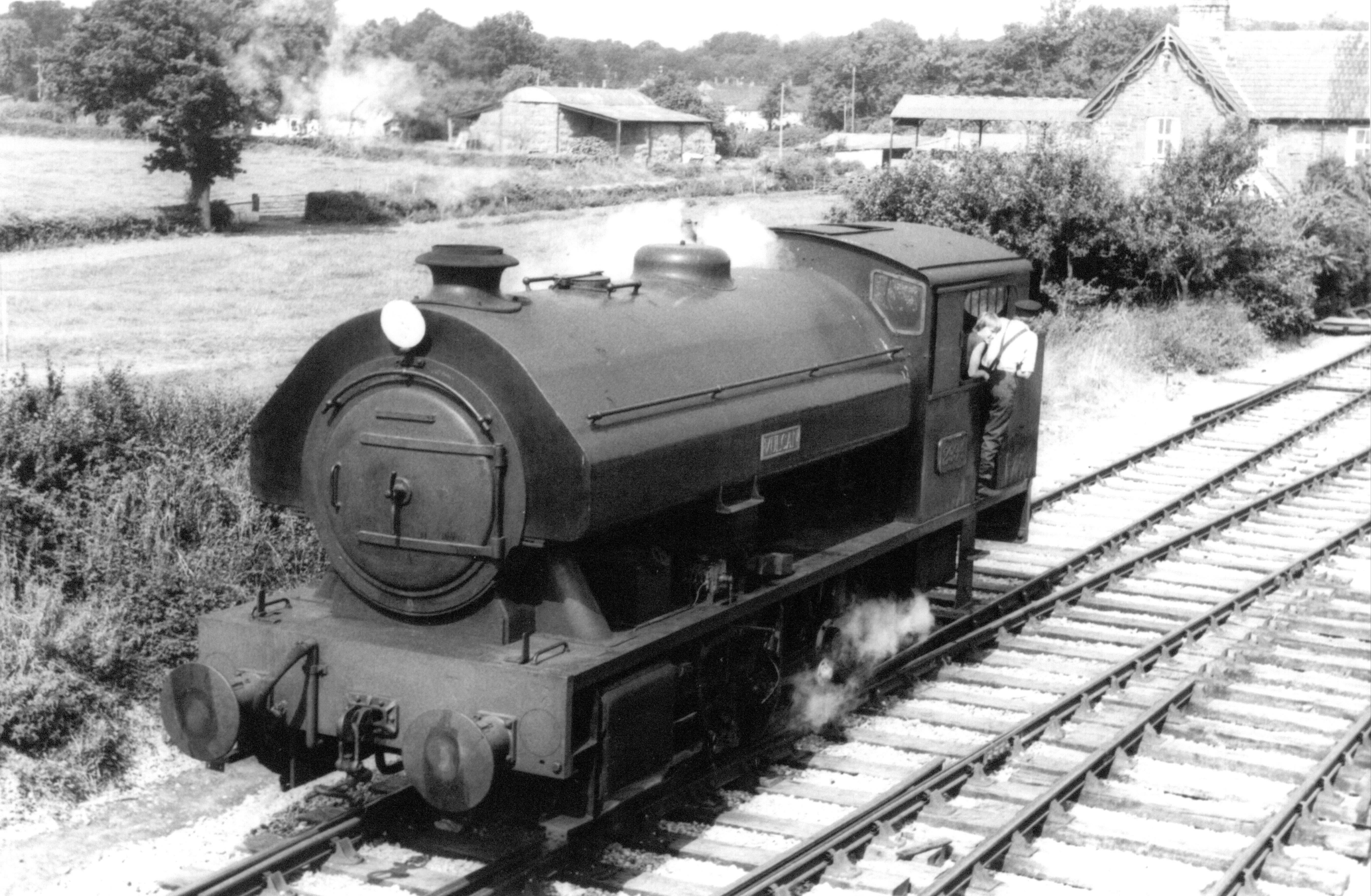
- Vulcan at Bishops Lydeard in 1980
Type and origin
- Power type: Steam
- Designer: W. G. Bagnall; Harold Wood
- Builder: W. G. Bagnall
- Serial number: 2994–2996
- Build date: 1951
- Total produced: 3
Specifications
- Configuration
  - Whyte: 0-6-0ST
  - UIC: C n2t
- Gauge: 4 ft 8 1/2 in (1,435 mm)
- Driver dia.: 4 ft 3 in (1.3 m)
- Fuel type: Coal
- Cylinders: Two, outside
- Cylinder size: 18 in × 24 in (460 mm × 610 mm)
- Valve gear: Walschaerts valve gear
- Valve type: Piston valves
Performance figures
- Tractive effort: 25,250 lbf (112.32 kN)
Career
- Operators: Steel Company of Wales → Austin Motor Company (2), National Coal Board (1)
- Withdrawn: 1956–1966
- Preserved: Victor 2996, Vulcan 2994
- Disposition: Two preserved, one scrapped

The W. G. Bagnall New Standard 18 0-6-0ST is a type of industrial steam locomotive designed by Harold Wood at W.G. Bagnall in 1951 and manufactured at the company's Castle Engine Works. The class was specifically designed for the Port Talbot Steelworks, and ran there from 1951 to 1973. Two locomotives later worked at the British Leyland Longbridge plant and are now preserved.

== Design and construction ==
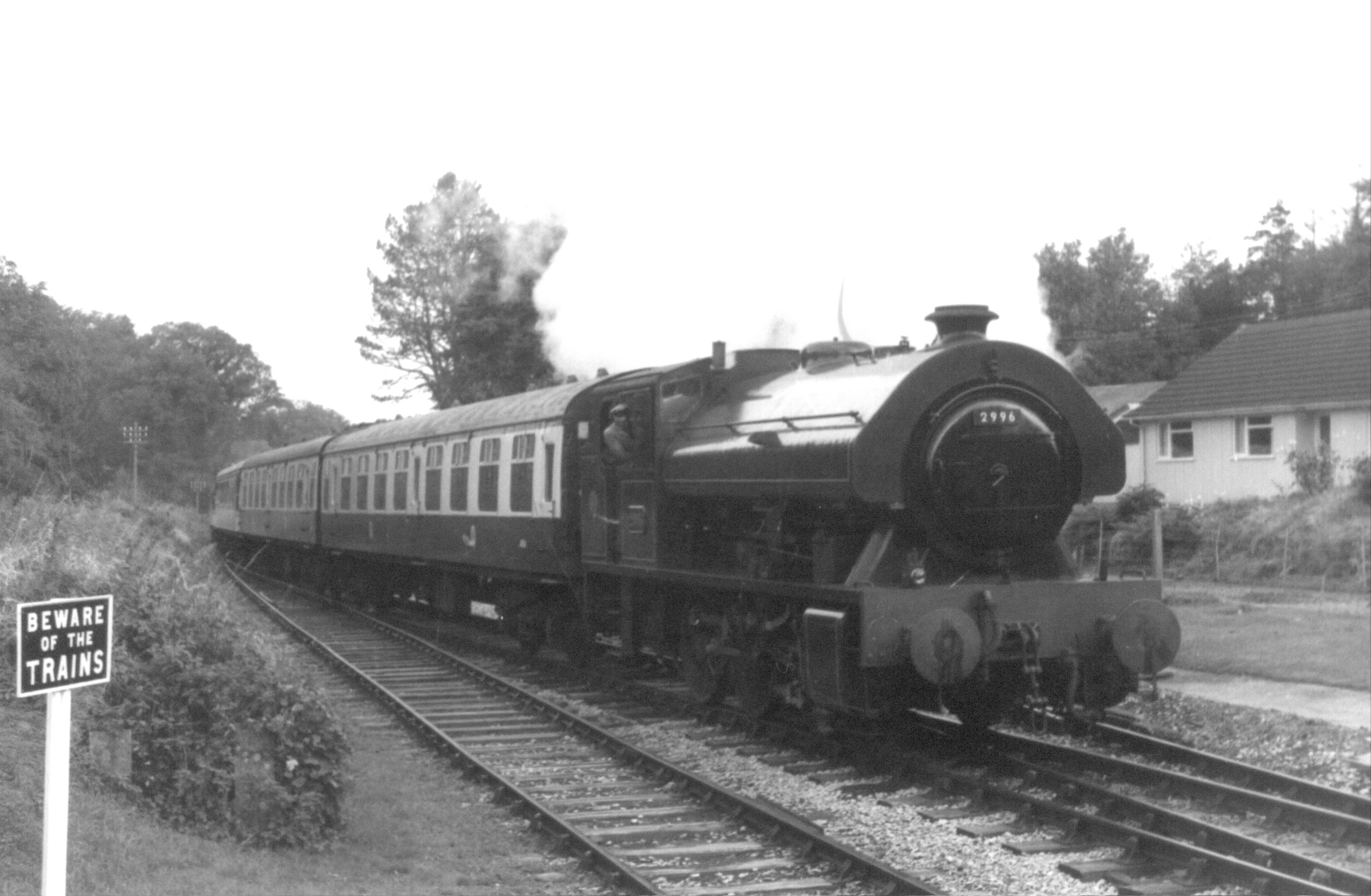
2996 Victor

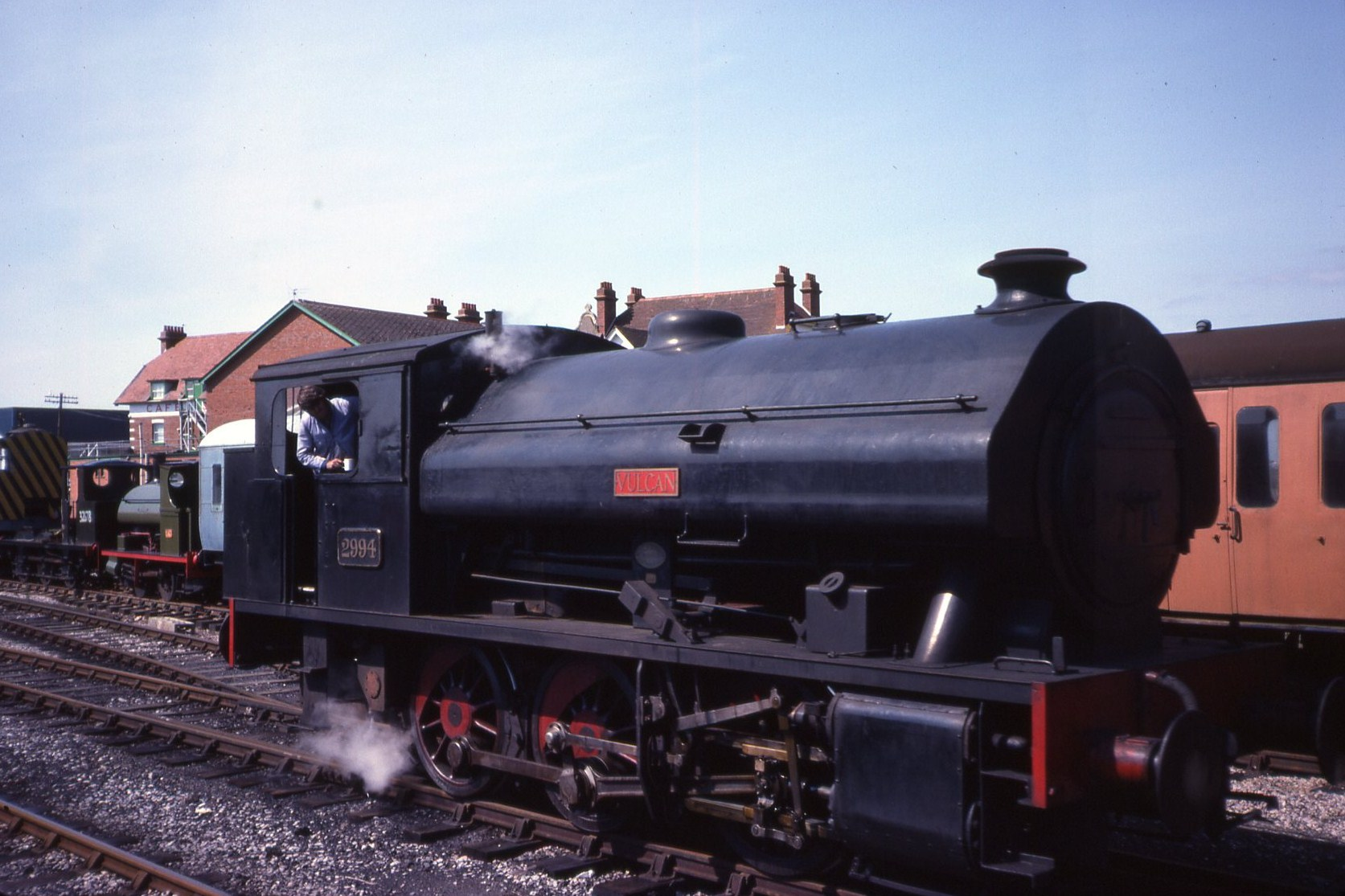
2994 Vulcan

Three locomotives were ordered by the Steel Company of Wales (SCOW) for their Abbey, Margam and Port Talbot works in 1950 and built by Bagnall with works numbers 2994–2996. The Steel Company of Wales wanted to see how economical and effective steam locomotives could be compared to diesel locomotives. In order to give a fair comparison with a modern steam locomotive, not the elderly steam locos that they had at that time, SCOW ordered large and specially designed tank locomotives from W.G. Bagnall, who had previously provided two powerful 0-4-0ST locomotives to Port Talbot in the 1930s.

W.G. Bagnall intended for the New Standard 18 locomotives to be their new standard, post-war heavy shunter, but with diesel locomotives becoming more popular in the industrial locomotive markets, the Steel Company of Wales would be the only customer. W.G. Bagnall merged with Brush Traction in 1951 to create Brush Bagnall Traction Limited, which focused more on diesel locomotives.

To make maintenance easier the locomotives had a wide range of features that were uncommon on industrial locomotives, including roller-type big-end and side-rod bearings, manganese steel axle-box and horn plate liners, hopper ashpans, self-cleaning smokeboxes and rocking grates. The locomotives had outside cylinders and Walschaerts valve gear. Steel fireboxes were used as well as "Owens" patent poppet valve and balanced regulator valves. As was usual for short-journey locomotives they were not fitted with superheating, as short journeys allow little time for the superheater elements to reach working temperature.

The cylinders provided for the class were 18-by-24-inch (460 mm × 610 mm), together with 4 ft 3 in (1.3 m) diameter driving wheels. The dimensions of the class were comparable to the Hunslet Austerity 0-6-0ST, widely used for similar purposes. The Bagnall locomotives had 25,250 lbf (112.3 kN) of tractive effort, which was higher than the Hunslet locomotives' 23,870 lbf (106.2 kN) and for a UK industrial engine second only to the Peckett OQ Class with 29,527 lbf (131.34 kN).

== Industrial service ==
=== Steel Company of Wales ===
When they first arrived at Port Talbot the locomotives were given the running numbers 401–403, in the same order as their works numbers. The three locos performed above and beyond the requirements of their original design specification and were noted for their high reliability and availability, however the decision was made in favour of diesel power and by 1957 all three had been replaced by Brush Bagnall diesel locomotives.

=== Longbridge ===
Locomotives 2994 and 2996 were sold to the Austin Motor Company (later to become British Leyland) for use at their Longbridge plant in Birmingham. At Longbridge the locomotives received the names Victor and Vulcan, a reference to the RAF V bombers then entering service. The two locomotives remained in service at Longbridge until 1973.

=== National Coal Board ===
2995 was not required by Austin and was sold to a scrap and plant dealer in South Wales from whom it was purchased by the National Coal Board for use at one of their collieries in South Wales until problems developed with its steel firebox. Steel fireboxes are less tolerant of poor maintenance and it is likely that the loco did not receive boiler washouts as regularly as should have been the case. Serious consideration was given to replacing the boiler with one from a Great Western Railway pannier tank locomotive, but this idea was not pursued and the loco was subsequently scrapped on site in 1967.

== Preservation ==
The two locomotives from Longbridge were purchased in 1973 for use on the West Somerset Railway. Victor ran the first train on the preserved line in December 1975 and along with GWR 6412 worked passenger trains once the railway re-opened in 1976. Vulcan was brought into service the following year. The class were never intended, nor suited, for operation over such a long line but in the right hands could put up some remarkable performances. However their rough riding, a consequence of their short wheelbase and long overhangs, earned them the nickname "Camel class".

Vulcan (2994) was sold in 1986 to the North Tyneside Steam Railway. It was renamed Thomas Burt and was in service until 2008. Following an overhaul the locomotive returned to service in 2019.

Victor (2996) was sold in 1988 to the Strathspey Railway. After subsequent spells on both the Battlefield Line Railway and the Great Central Railway (Nottingham) the locomotive moved in 2009 to the Lakeside and Haverthwaite Railway where it was overhauled and put into service.

== Fleet list ==
Works Number	Built	Name	Notes	Status	Location
2994	1951	Vulcan	Worked on the West Somerset Railway from 1977 to 1986. Re-entered service in April 2019 after a lengthy overhaul.	Operational	North Tyneside Steam Railway
2995	1951		Went to NCB	Scrapped in 1967	
2996	1951	Victor	Worked on the West Somerset Railway from 1975 to 1989 then moved to the Strathspey Railway, then the Great Central Railway (Nottingham section) and the Battlefield Line. After the expiry of its boiler certificate it moved to Tyseley. In 2015 the overhaul was completed.	Operational	Lakeside and Haverthwaite Railway

== See also ==
- Hunslet Austerity 0-6-0ST, a comparable locomotive from Hunslet
- Bagnall fireless locomotives (preserved)
- Bagnall 0-4-0ST "Alfred" and "Judy"
