= Amberley Museum Railway =

Narrow gauge railway in Amberley, West Sussex, England

Coordinates: 50°54′02″N 0°32′10″W

Amberley Museum Railway Collection
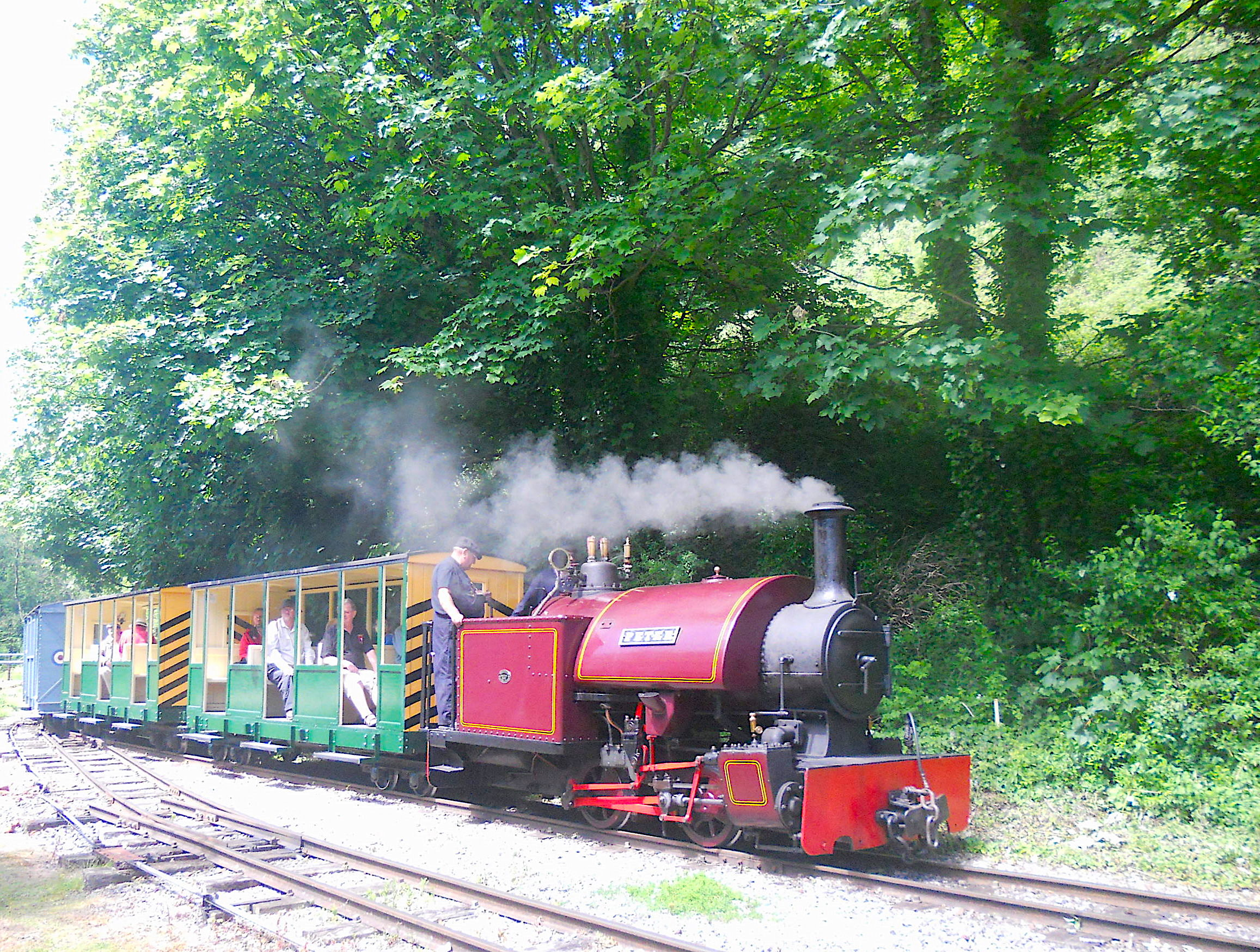
- Bagnall 0-4-0ST 'Peter' and a passenger train nears Brockham Station

Overview
- Dates of operation: 1982–present

Technical
- Track gauge: 2 ft (610 mm)
- Length: 500 yd (460 m)

Other
- Website: Amberley Museum and Heritage Centre Rail Group website

The Amberley Museum Railway is a 2 ft (610 mm) narrow gauge railway based at Amberley Museum, Amberley, West Sussex. It has a varied collection of engines and rolling stock ranging from 18 in (457 mm) gauge to 5 ft 3 in (1,600 mm) gauge. It operates passenger trains at the museum using a mixture of steam, internal combustion and battery-electric locomotives.

== History ==
=== Pre-Preservation ===
Before the advent of Amberley Museum, the site was a chalk quarry operated by Pepper & Sons. The site had its own loco worked 4 ft 8 1/2 in (1,435 mm) standard gauge railway, which connected with the London, Brighton & South Coast Railway at Amberley station. Over the years Peppers owned a range of locos, including Marshall and Aveling & Porter steam designs, and a Hibberd Planet petrol loco. When the site was abandoned in the late 1960s the track was lifted.

=== Early Days ===
When the museum opened in the late 1970s a small industrial railway was envisaged, operating typical narrow gauge industrial trains. The first loco to arrive on site was Hibberd Simplex 1980 from the City of Chichester Sewage Works at Apuldram. In 1982 the Thakeham Tiles company, located a few miles from the museum, donated its entire railway system including two Hudson Hunslet locos, several wagons and some track, a new conveyor system having started operation at the works. The donation was on the condition the whole lot was removed over a weekend. This was duly accomplished. Today some of the Thakeham track is still in use on non-passenger parts of the line, along with one of the locos (Hunslet 3653). The other, Hudson Hunslet 2208 is in store, having been used as a spares donor for the museum's other Hudson Hunslet locos. Also in 1982, the Brockham Railway Museum in Surrey closed down and moved its entire stock to Amberley. This influx, including several steam locos, gave the inspiration to expand the operation to a passenger carrying line.

=== The Combined Collection ===
A running line was built at Amberley from 1982 to 1984 running along one side of the pit between Amberley and Brockham stations. The inaugural train was hauled by Polar Bear, by that time back in steam. The Hunslet diesels 3097 and Blue Star were stalwarts of the passenger service in the 80s, until the arrival of Motor Rail Simplex 60S prototype 11001. In the mid-1980s Decauville 0-4-0WT 'Barbouilleur' entered service, and following Polar Bear's boiler being condemned around 1987, was the sole steam locomotive available until 1993. 'Polar Bear' re-entered traffic with a new boiler in 1993, and was joined that same year by 'Peter'. 'Townsend Hook' departed in 1995 to Eastleigh College for an ultimately ill-fated restoration attempt.

=== Expansion ===
The railway expanded in the 2000s. In the early 2000s it was decided that WW1 Baldwin 4-6-0PT 778 Lion, which had been in store for many years, needed an alternative home as it was too big for the sharp curves at Amberley. It departed for the Leighton Buzzard Light Railway, where it is now in service.

A new exhibition hall and carriage shed, built with lottery funding, was opened in 2003; the carriage fleet had previously deteriorated when stored outside. A new running shed opened in 2005, serving as the operating and restoration base for the passenger steam fleet, as well as a dedicated home and charging station for the battery electric locos. The steam fleet was bolstered in 2006 by the arrival of the Hampshire Narrow Gauge Trust's Bagnall 0-4-0ST 2091 Wendy.

The running line was extended in mid-2007 with a new section round the top of the pit to Cragside station. In 2008 Hunslet diesel-hydraulic 8969 No. 12 entered service as the main non-steam passenger loco. The steam fleet grew again in 2009 when HNGRT's other steam loco, Quarry Hunslet 0-4-0ST 542 Cloister arrived. However both HNGRT locos left Amberley during summer 2012.

== The line today ==
The main line runs from Amberley station near the museum entrance along the side of the pit past the De Witt lime kilns to Brockham station, currently the only intermediate station. From Brockham the line curves round the top of the pit, passes the running shed and ends up at Cragside station, across the pit from Brockham. The industrial (non-passenger) lines connect to the main line at Brockham station. At Amberley station there is a rarely used siding into the woodyard. Brockham has a small siding on Platform 2, as well as a former London, Brighton and South Coast Railway ticket office from Hove station. In addition there is the Betchworth Hall shed, used for the restoration of Townsend Hook; it will eventually be used as a museum to display the Dorking Greystone Lime Co. exhibits (Townsend Hook, Monty, The Major, wagons 10 and 60, and some miscellaneous items).

The railway holds its annual Gala Weekend on the second weekend of July each year, in addition to two Industrial Trains Days in April and October.

== Locomotives ==
Listings correct as of December 2017

Engines marked 'In occasional use' are generally only operated at railway special events and are usually either on display in the museum building or stored in one of the sheds or the tunnel. Locos marked 'Air Fitted/Piped' are capable of hauling passenger trains.

=== Steam locomotives ===
Name	Works Number	Type	Gauge	Builder	Year built	Previous Operator	Status	Notes	Image
Polar Bear	1781	2-4-0T	2 ft (610 mm)	W.G. Bagnall	1905	Groudle Glen Railway	In use	Boiler Certificate expired in 2023. Currently being overhauled. Air fitted.	
Peter	2067	0-4-0ST	2 ft (610 mm)	W.G. Bagnall	1917	Cliffe Hill Quarry Co.	In use	Built as 3 ft (914 mm) gauge, converted to 2 ft (610 mm) in 1919. Boiler Certificate expires in 2032. Air fitted.	
Barbouilleur	1126	0-4-0WT	600 mm (1 ft 11 5/8 in)	Decauville	1947	L'enterprise Gagneraud	Static display	Currently being overhauled. Privately owned. Air fitted.	
Townsend Hook	172L	0-4-0T	3 ft 2 1/4 in (972 mm)	Fletcher Jennings	1880	Dorking Greystone & Lime Co Ltd, Betchworth	Static display		
23	23L	0-4-0T	1 ft 10 in (559 mm)	Wm. Spence	1920	Guinness Brewery, Dublin	Static display		

=== Internal combustion locomotives ===
Name	Works Number	Gauge	Builder	Year built	Previous Operator	Status	Notes	Image
T0001	3751	2 ft (610 mm)	Baguley-Drewry	1980	RNAD Dean Hill, Wiltshire	In occasional use. Privately Owned. Air fitted.		
Peldon	JF21295	2 ft (610 mm)	Fowler	1936	Essex Water Authority, Abberton	In use. Air fitted.		
-	FH1980	2 ft (610 mm)	Hibberd	1936	City of Chichester Sewage Works	In occasional use.		
-	FH3627	2 ft (610 mm)	Hibberd	1953	North Bierley Sewage Works, Bradford	In occasional use.		
-	45913	2 ft 6 in (762 mm)	Hudson	1932	Midhurst Whites Ltd, Midhurst	ex-Gloddfa Ganol. On static display.		
-	DM686	2 ft (610 mm)	Hudswell Clarke	1948	National Coal Board, Tilmanstone Colliery	Undergoing cosmetic restoration.		
-	HE2208	2 ft (610 mm)	Hudson Hunslet	1941	Thakeham Tiles, Storrington	Source of spares.		
-	HE3097	2 ft (610 mm)	Hudson Hunslet	1944	Borough of Merton Sewage Works	In use. Air fitted.		
Blue Star	Unknown	2 ft (610 mm)	Hudson Hunslet	Unknown	Star Construction, Partridge Green, Sussex	In use. Air fitted.		
-	HE3653	2 ft (610 mm)	Hunslet	1946	Thakeham Tiles, Storrington	In occasional use.		
No.12	HE8969	2 ft (610 mm)	Hunslet	1980	BAE Bishopton, Glasgow	In use. Air fitted.		
-	L33937	2 ft (610 mm)	Lister	1949	William H Collier Ltd, Marks Tey	In occasional use. Privately Owned.		
-	L34521	2 ft (610 mm)	Lister	1949	Cumberland Moss Litter Industries, Carlisle	In occasional use.		
Redland	OK6193	2 ft (610 mm)	Orenstein & Koppel	1937	Redland Pipes Ltd., Ripley	In occasional use.		
Monty	OK7269	3 ft 2 1/4 in (972 mm)	Orenstein & Koppel	1936	Dorking Greystone & Lime Co Ltd, Betchworth	In occasional use.		
The Major	OK7741	2 ft (610 mm)	Orenstein & Koppel	1937	Dorking Greystone & Lime, Betchworth	In occasional use.		
Sonia	OK4013	2 ft (610 mm)	Orenstein & Koppel	1930	Diamond Tread (Chart) Ltd (Ashford)	In occasional use. Privately Owned.		
-	MR872	2 ft (610 mm)	Motor Rail	1918	C V Buchan & Co Ltd	Static display.		
'The Breadbin'	MR1381	2 ft (610 mm)	Motor Rail	1918	War Department	In occasional use.		
No.27	MR5863	2 ft (610 mm)	Motor Rail	1934	Joseph Arnold, Leighton Buzzard	In occasional use.		
-	MR10161	2 ft 11 in (889 mm)	Motor Rail	1950	London Brick Works, Arlesey	Static display.		
Ibstock	MR11001	2 ft (610 mm)	Motor Rail	1956	London Brick Co., Yaxley	In use. Air fitted.		
Burt	MR9019	1,435 mm (4 ft 8 1/2 in)	Motor Rail	1959	Burt, Boulton and Haywood Timber, Erith	In occasional use.		
-	RR80	2 ft (610 mm)	Ransomes and Rapier	1936	Chinnor Cement & Lime Co Ltd	In occasional use.		
-	RH166024	2 ft (610 mm)	Ruston & Hornsby	1933	Colne Valley Water Co, Rickmansworth	Dismantled, awaiting restoration.		
-	RH187081	2 ft (610 mm)	Ruston & Hornsby	1937	City of York Sewage Department	In occasional use. Privately Owned.		
-	4	2 ft (610 mm)	Thakeham Tiles	c1946	Thakeham Tiles, Storrington	ex-Gloddfa Ganol. In occasional use. Privately owned.		
-	5	2 ft (610 mm)	Thakeham Tiles	c1950	Thakeham Tiles, Storrington	In occasional use. Privately owned.		
WD904	3403	2 ft (610 mm)	D Wickham & Co	1943	MoD Eastriggs	In occasional use. Privately owned. Air piped.		

=== Battery-electric locomotives ===
Works Number	Gauge	Builder	Year built	Previous Operator	Status	Notes	Image
16303	2 ft (610 mm)	Brush Traction	1917	HMEF Queensferry, Deeside	Operational, occasional use. Privately owned.		
16306	2 ft (610 mm)	Brush Traction	1917	HMEF Queensferry, Deeside	Dismantled, incomplete. Used as spares for 16303. No longer on site.		
808	2 ft (610 mm)	English Electric	1931	Post Office Railway, London	Static Display.		
4998	2 ft (610 mm)	Wingrove & Rogers	1953	Redland Brick Ltd, North Holmwood	Operational. Air piped.		
5031	2 ft (610 mm)	Wingrove & Rogers	1953		Dismantled, source of spares.		
5034	2 ft (610 mm)	Wingrove & Rogers	1953	Redland Brick Ltd, North Holmwood	Operational.		
T8033	2 ft (610 mm)	Wingrove & Rogers	1979	Redland Brick Ltd, North Holmwood	Operational.		

== Passenger stock ==
- 1x RAF Fauld coach. Restored in 2007. Can run on its own or with the Lydd or Penrhyn coaches.
- 2x Lydd coaches. From Lydd Ranges in Kent. Can run together as a set or with the Fauld coach to make a 3-car set.
- 2x Penrhyn Quarry Railway coaches. Open top coaches, have to run with either the Fauld coach or one Lydd coach due to lack of a brake position or air brake reserve tanks.
- 4x Groudle Glen Railway coaches. Usually run with Polar Bear, but can run with certain other diesel and steam locos.
- Wickham trolley 3404. Originally trailer car for powered trolley 3403, now converted to push-pull trailer to run with battery loco 4998.
- 1x Thorpe Park coach. Built by Alan Keef. Body frame only. In very poor condition and due to be scrapped.

== Gallery ==
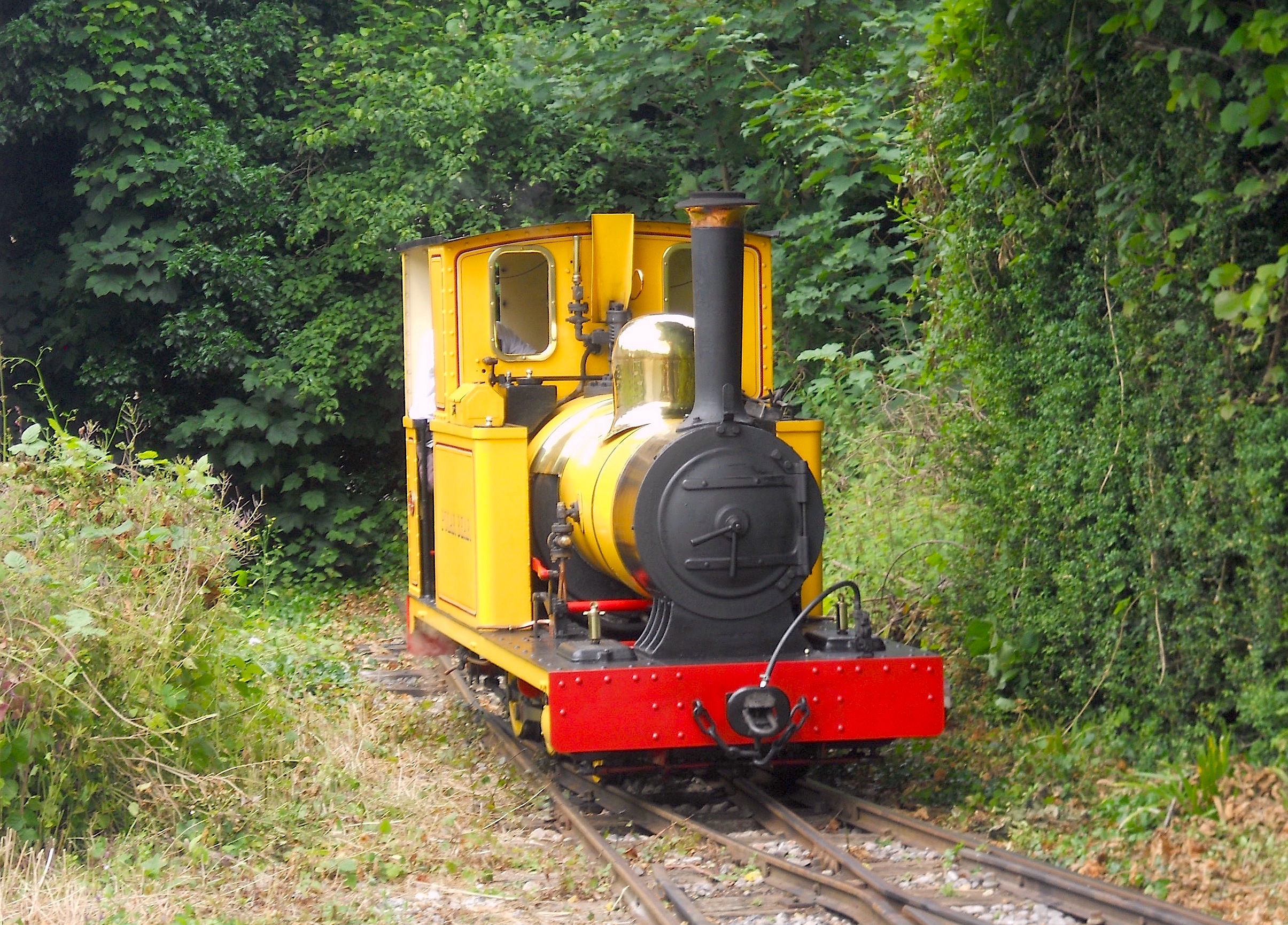
'Polar Bear' on the headshunt at Amberley

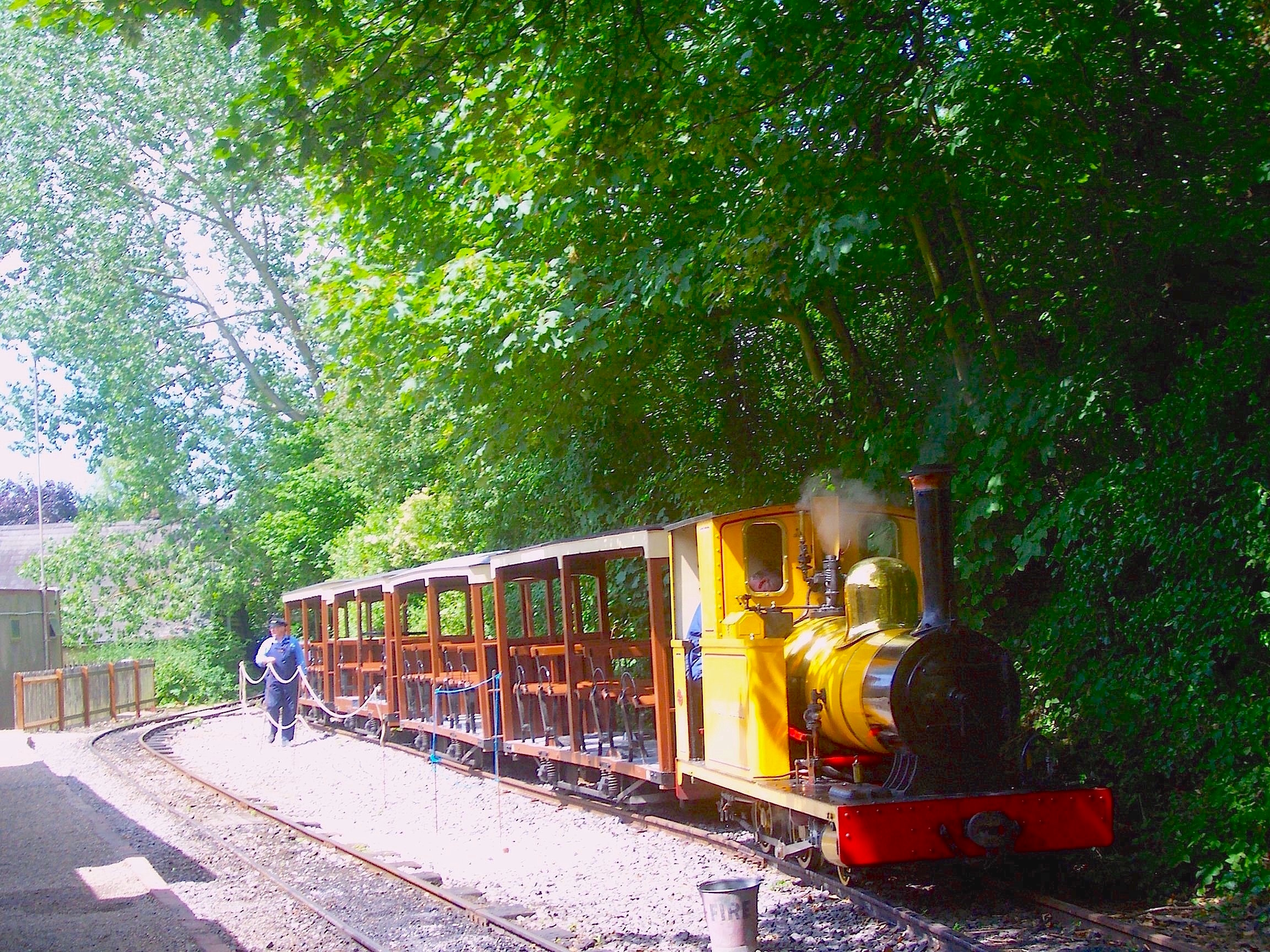
'Polar Bear' and replica Groudle Glen carriages at Amberley

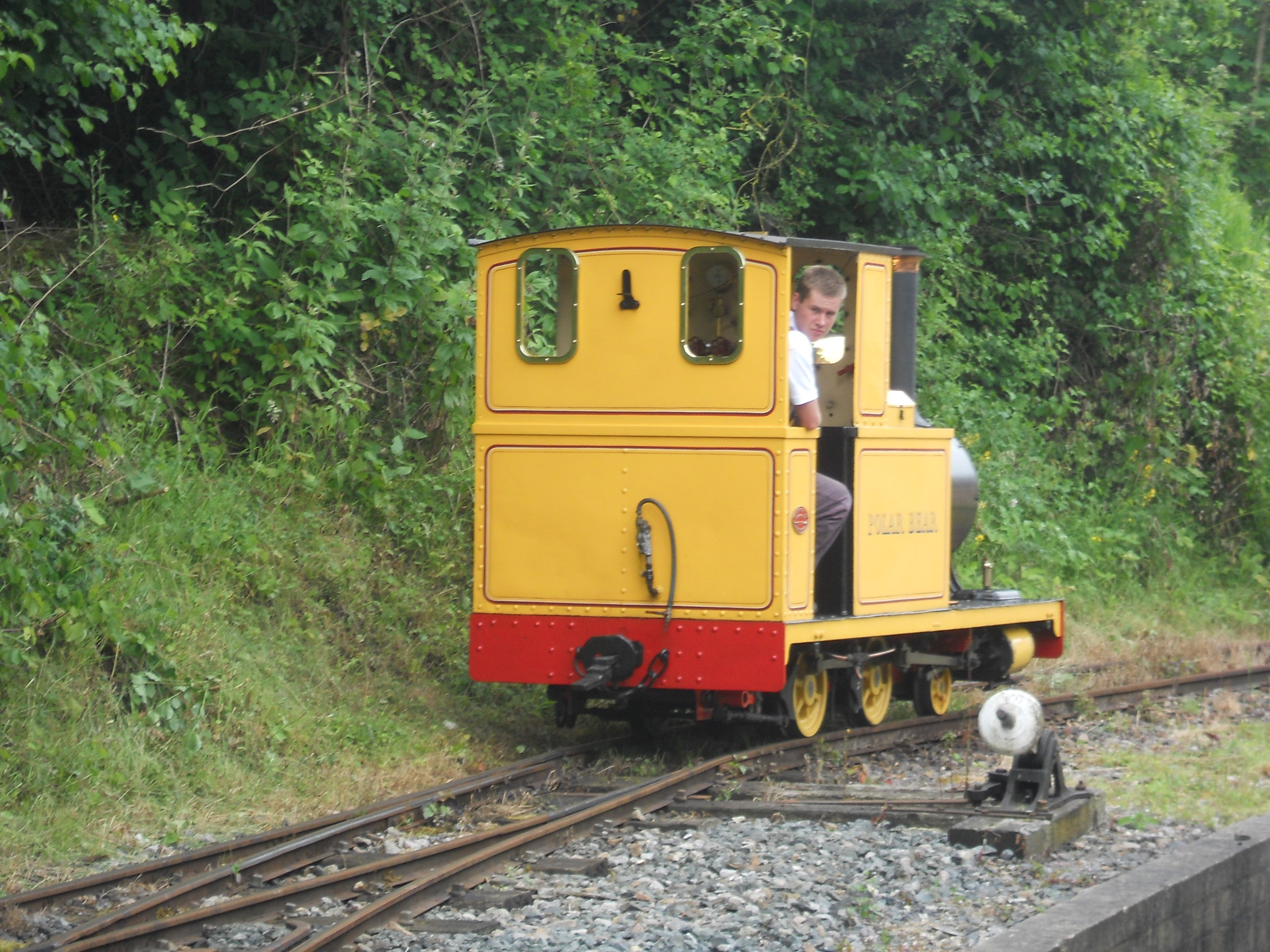
'Polar Bear' on the headshunt at Cragside

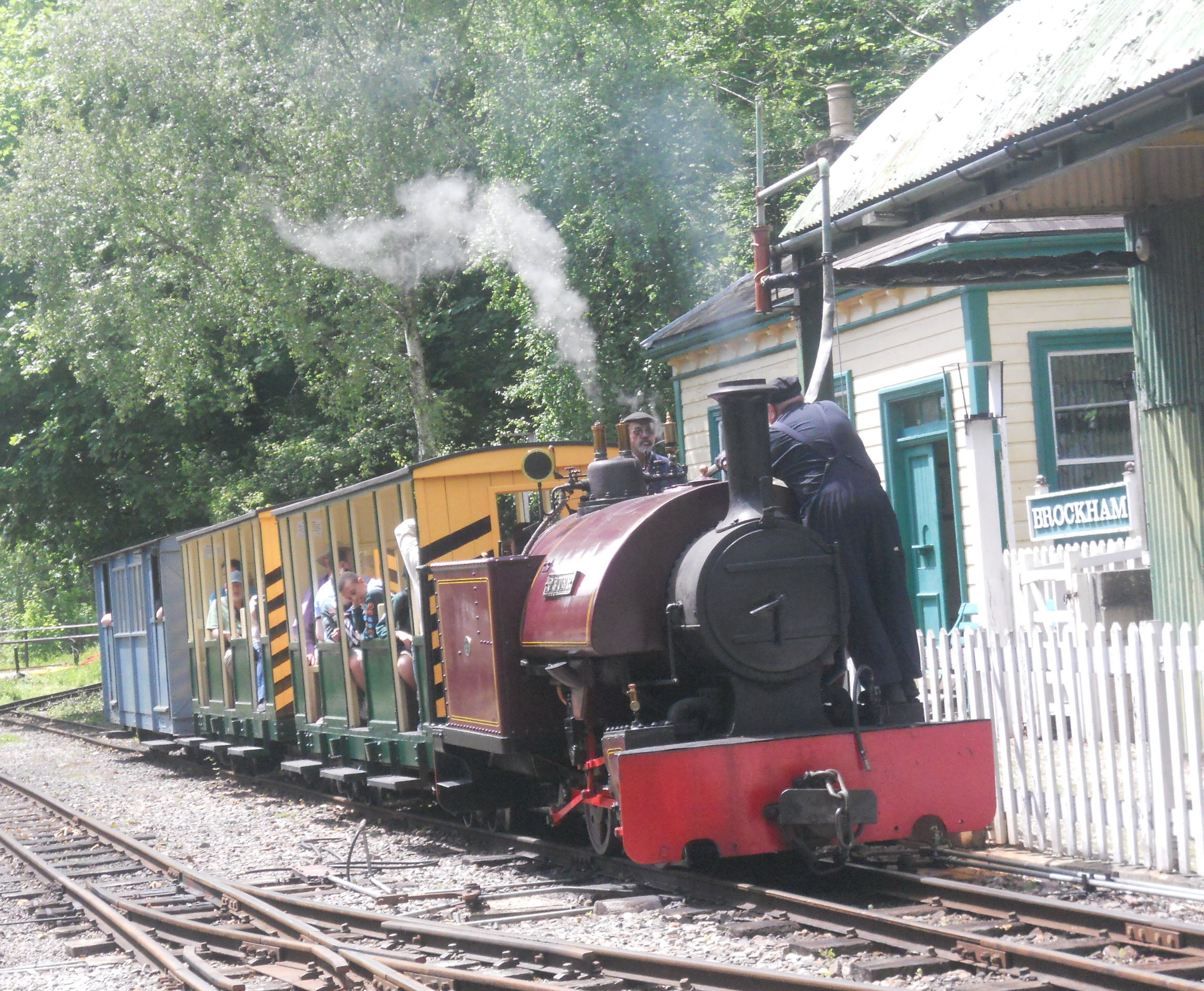
'Peter' and its passenger train at Brockham

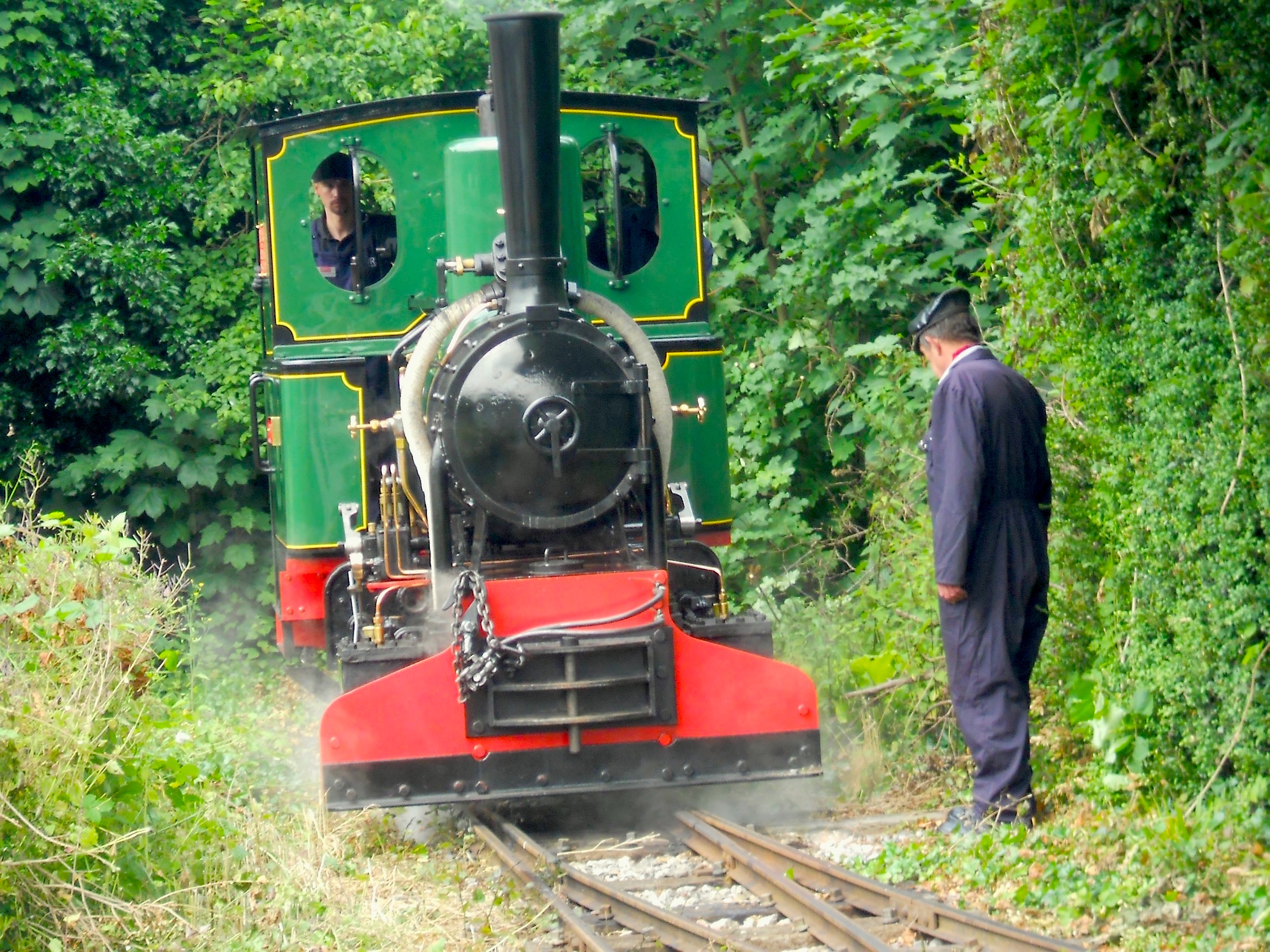
'Jenny' on the headshunt at Amberley

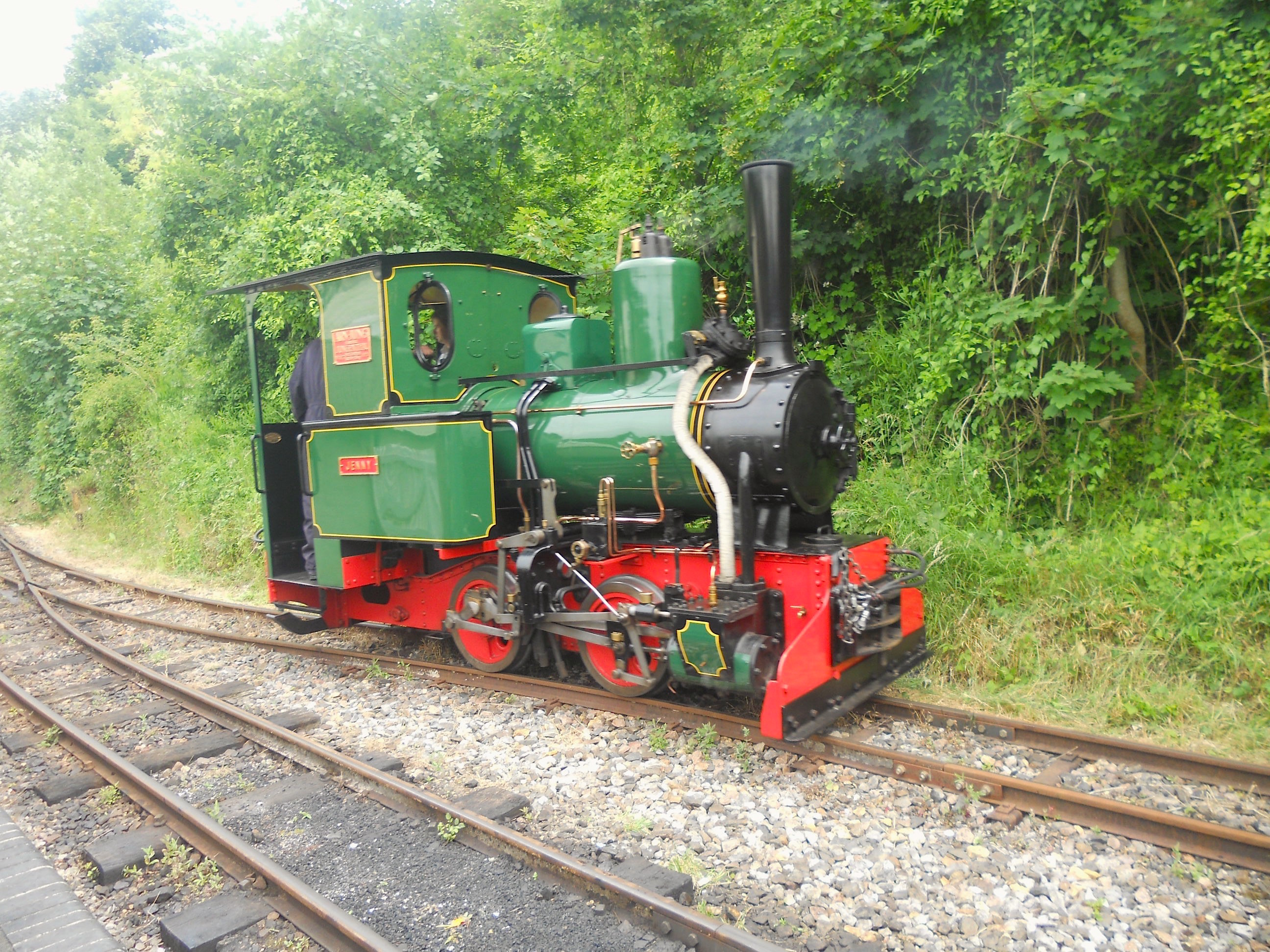
'Jenny' runs round the train at Cragside

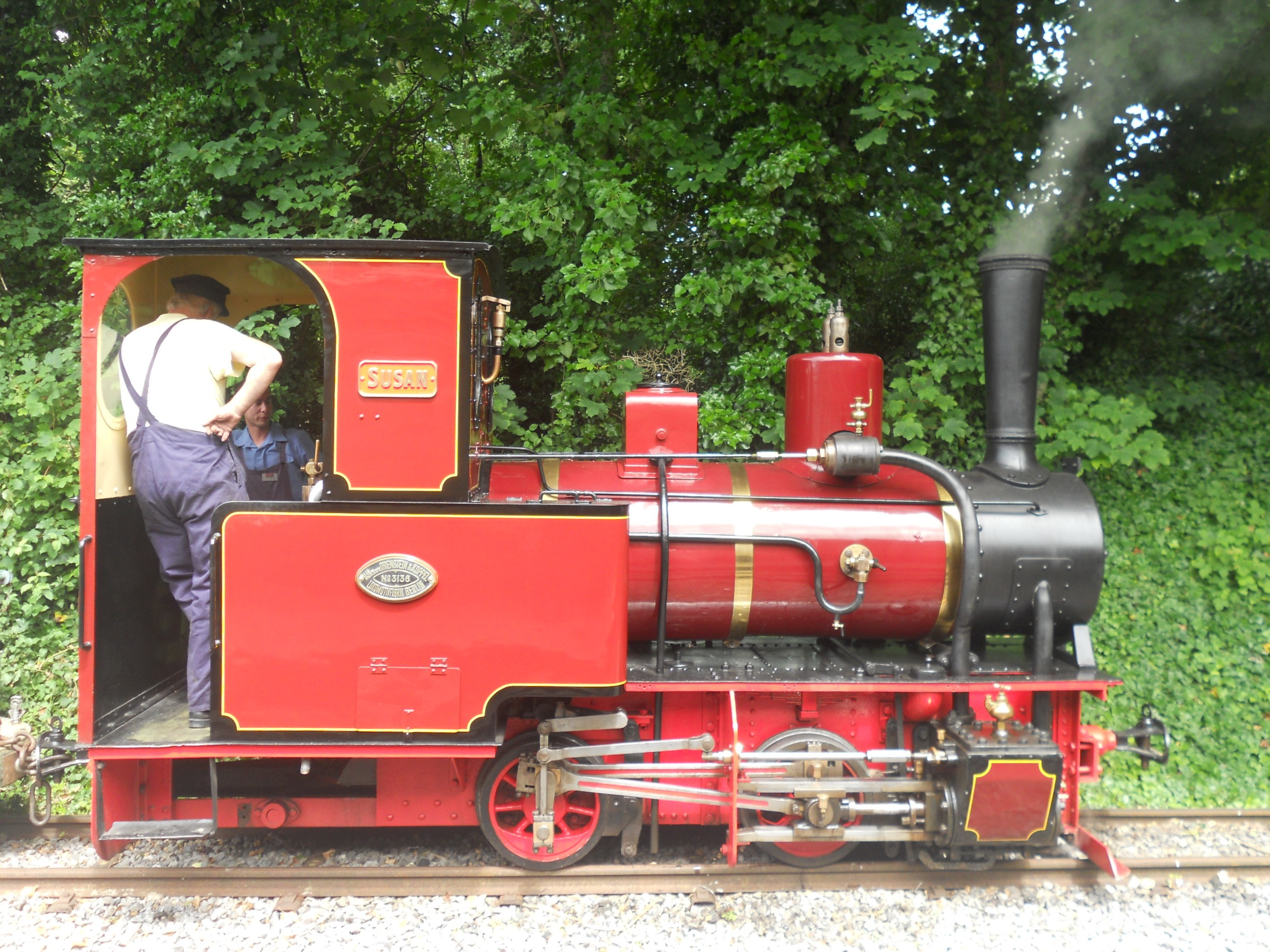
'Susan' at Amberley

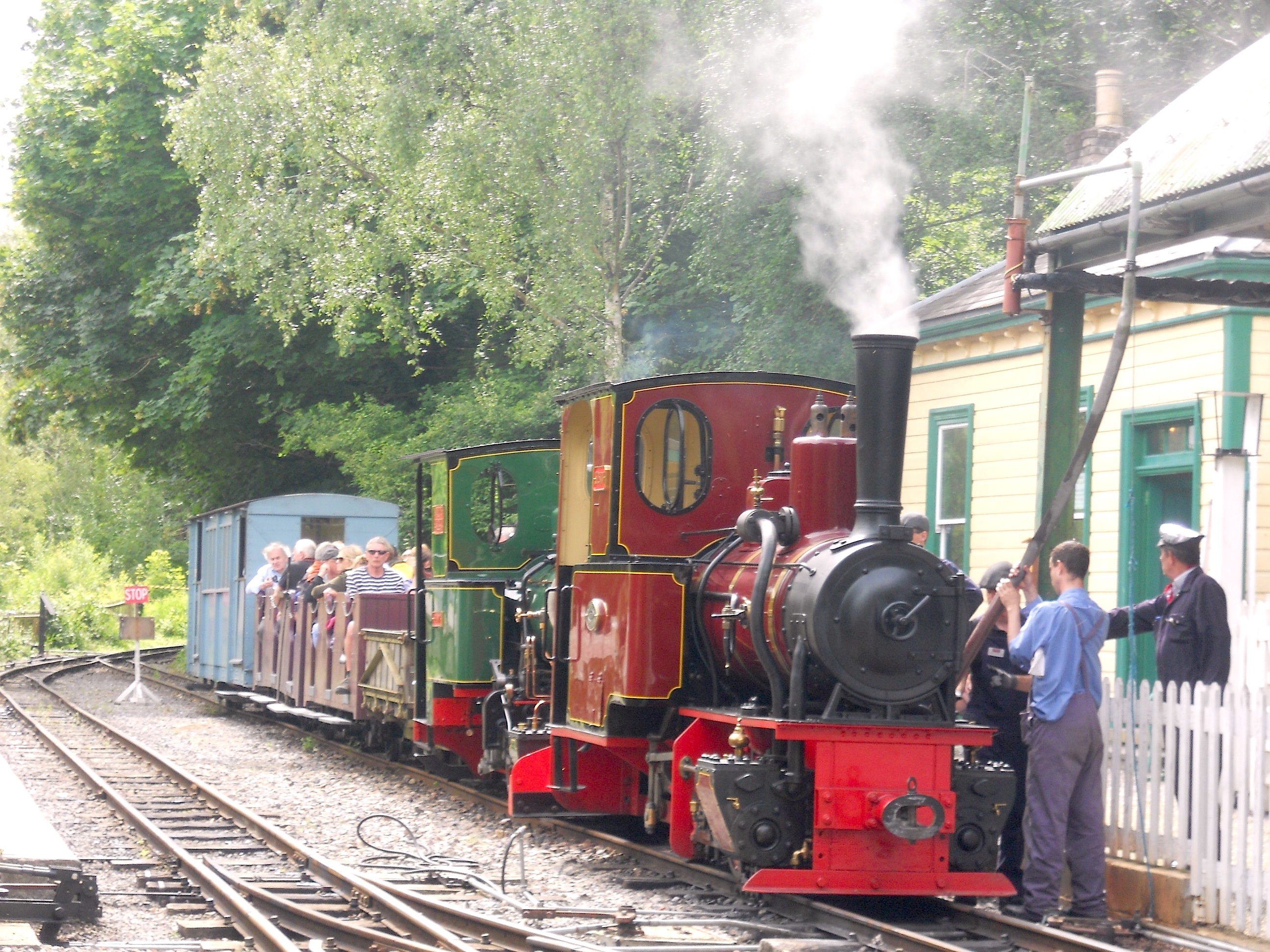
'Susan' and 'Jenny' double head a train at Brockham

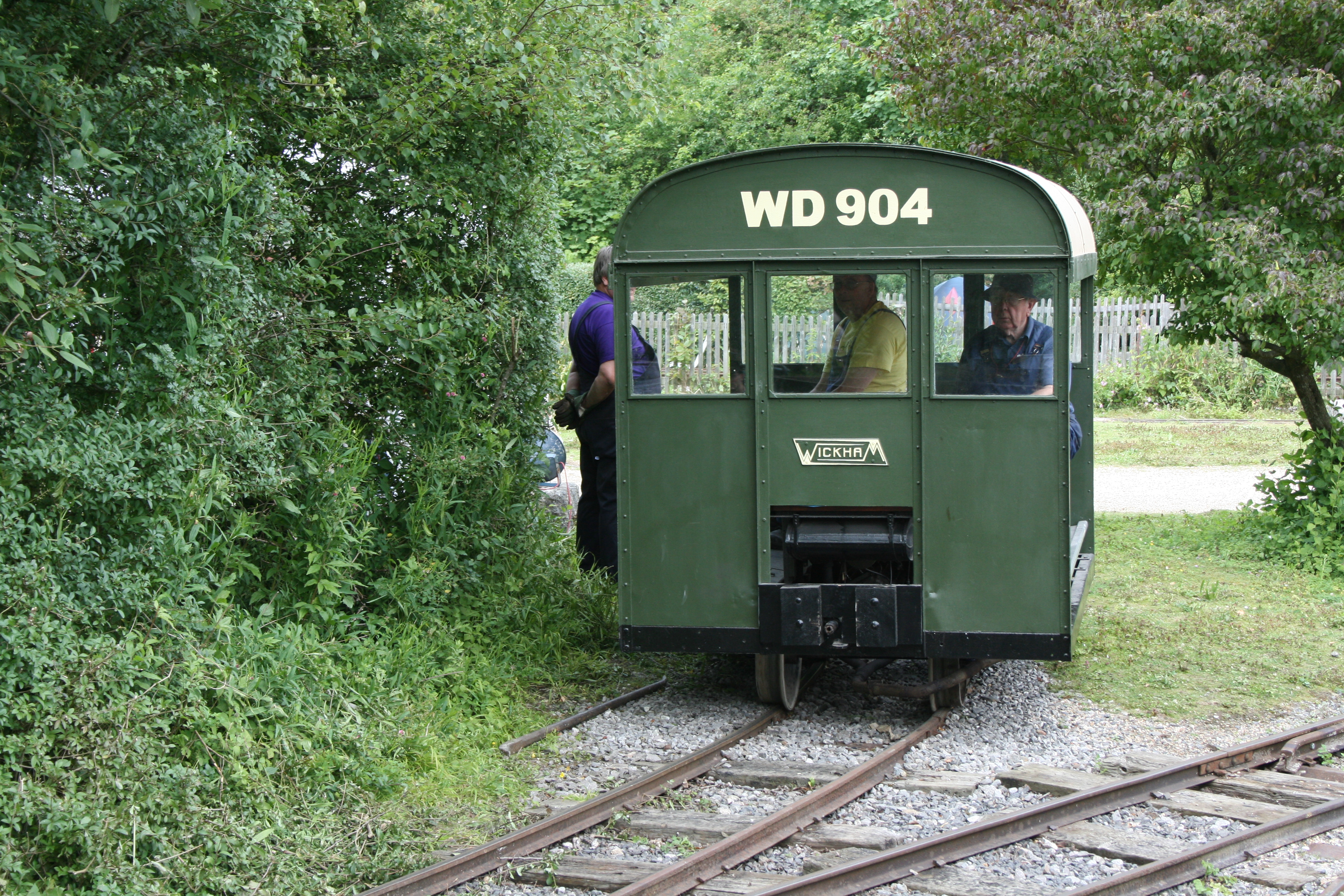
A Wickham trolley

== In popular culture ==
The railway made an appearance in the 1985 James Bond film, A View to a Kill, with the railway's storage tunnel appearing as the entrance to a mine. Later, engines HE3097 and 'Blue Star' were sent to Pinewood Studios along with a quantity of wagons to film scenes 'inside the mine'. Many of the railway's skip wagons still carry 'Zorin' green livery.

In 2010 four of the museum's Hudson flat wagons were sent to Pinewood Studios for use in the film, Captain America: The First Avenger.
