= William Gordon Bagnall =

Founder of the locomotive manufacturing company of W.G. Bagnall

William Gordon (W.G.) Bagnall
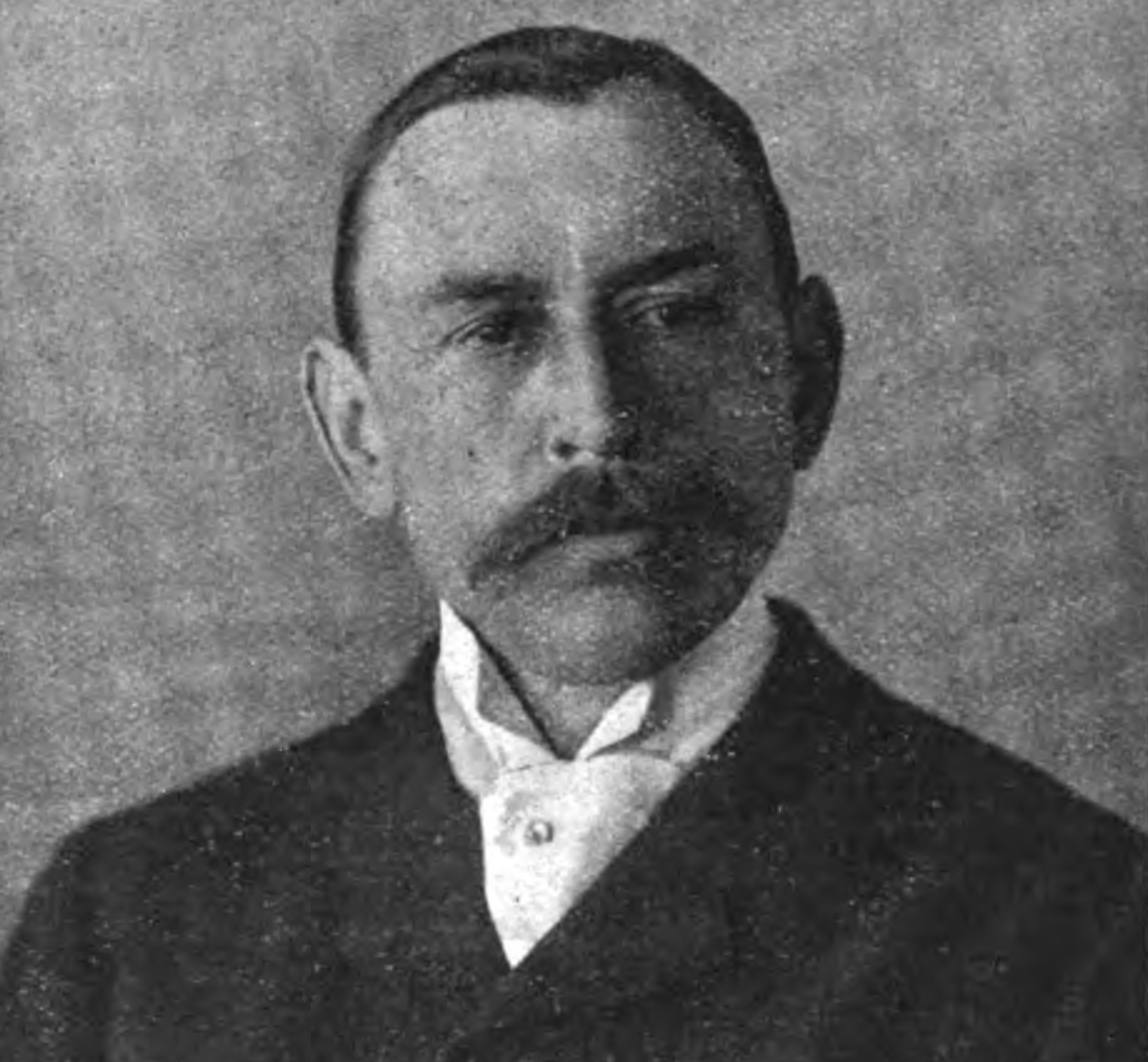
- Portrait of William Gordon Bagnall
- Born: 18 January 1852
- Died: 19 July 1907 (aged 55)
- Occupation: locomotive builder
- Known for: founder of W. G. Bagnall, Ltd.

William Gordon Bagnall (18 January 1852 – 19 July 1907) was a British mechanical engineer.

== Early life ==
Bagnall was born at Cliff House in Tamworth, Staffordshire. After school he worked for two years in a bank, then joined his father's company of John Bagnall & Sons of West Bromwich.

== Career ==
In 1875, Bagnall left his father's firm and set up his own engineering company, W.G. Bagnall. Although initially a general Millwrights, the company soon specialised in locomotive manufacturing and the supply of light railway equipment, especially for narrow-gauge railways.

In 1882, he was appointed as one of two liquidators for John Bagnall & Sons.

== Personal life ==
Bagnall was a member of the Staffordshire County Council and Stafford Town Council. In 1903, he fell ill and had to give up his public roles. He died in 1907 at the age of 55.
