= W. G. Bagnall =

Locomotive manufacturer based in Stafford, England

W.G. Bagnall ltd
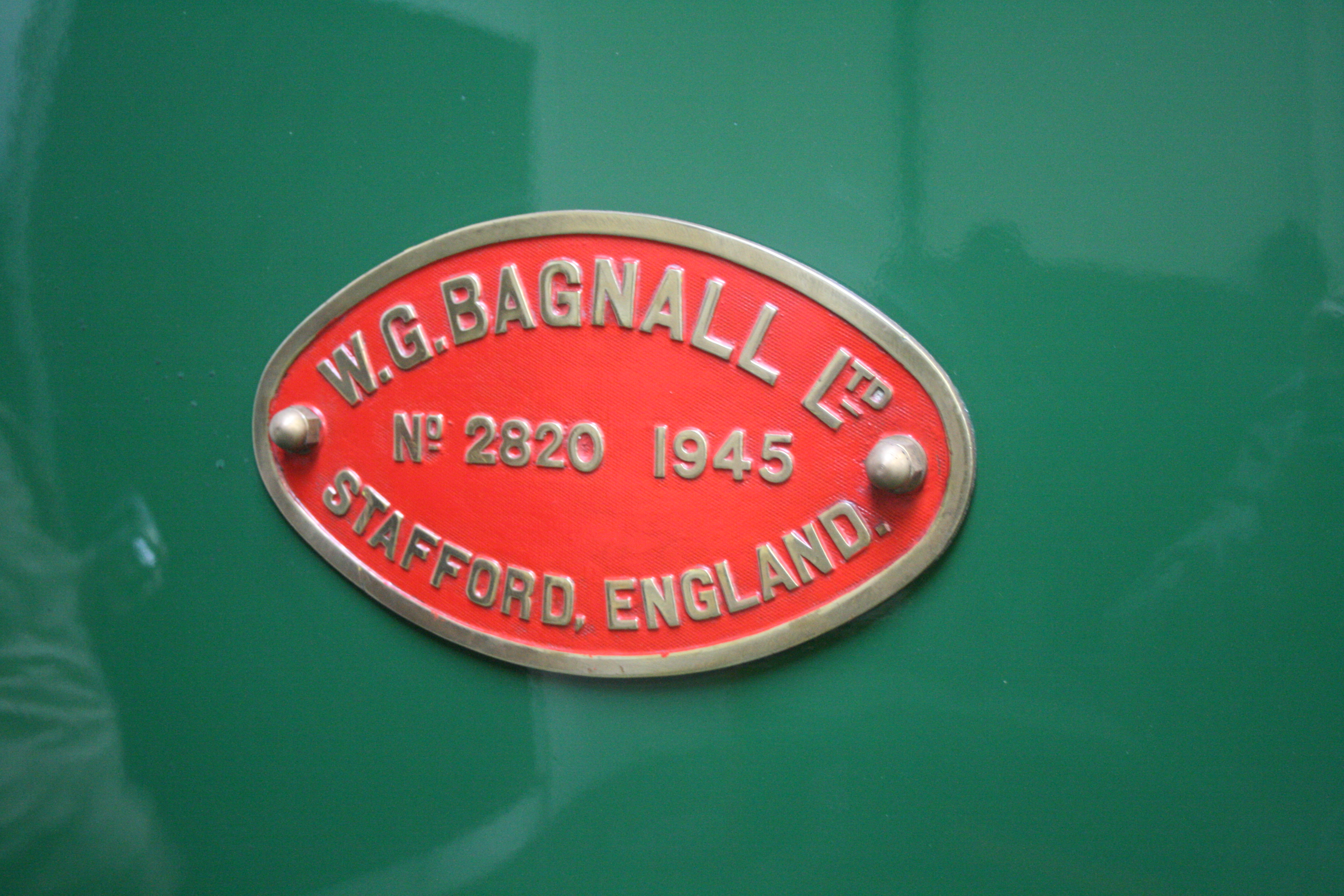
- Type: Ltd
- Industry: Engineering
- Founded: 1875
- Defunct: 1962
- Fate: Taken over
- Successor: English Electric
- Headquarters: Stafford, United Kingdom
- Key people: William Gordon Bagnall; Ernest E. Baguley
- Products: Locomotive manufacture Engine manufacture Rails; Sleepers; Spare parts Boilers

W. G. Bagnall was a locomotive manufacturer from Stafford, England. The firm was founded in 1875 and operated until it was taken over by English Electric in 1962.

== History ==
The company was founded in 1875 by William Gordon Bagnall. The majority of their products were small four- and six-coupled steam locomotives for industrial use, and many were narrow gauge. They were noted for building steam and diesel locomotives in standard and narrow gauges. Some of Kerr Stuart's designs were brought to Bagnalls when they employed Kerr Stuart's chief Draughtsman. Examples of such locomotives can be seen on the Sittingbourne & Kemsley Light Railway.

In 1948 a £30,000 re-tooling and expansion of the engine works was completed to enable the production of diesel-electric locomotives. Provision was made for erecting two locomotives at a time with the two-year target of building one diesel-electric locomotive per week, in addition to steam locomotive production.

In 1951, the company was sold to Brush Electrical Engineering, becoming Brush-Bagnall Traction, Ltd. In 1959, Bagnall's merged with local engine manufacturer Dorman Diesels. In 1962, both were taken over by English Electric Co Ltd. English Electric then formed English Electric Traction, which amalgamated the two companies with Robert Stephenson and Hawthorns and Vulcan Foundry (acquired by English Electric in 1955) to bring all their railway activities under one management.

== Location ==
The company was located at the Castle Engine Works, in Castletown, Stafford. The factory has been demolished and housing is being built on the site, which will be known as Bagnall Meadows.

== Design ==
Bagnalls introduced two types of locomotive valve gear: the Baguley and the Bagnall-Price. They also used marine (circular) fireboxes on narrow gauge engines, a design that was cheap but needed a different firing technique.

Bagnall developed the inverted saddle tank. The two tanks were joined underneath the smokebox and supported it. Bagnall also commonly used the saddle tank design, in which the water tank is on top of the boiler.

== Steam locomotives ==
The company built many locomotives for both domestic use and export.

Bagnalls also supplied locomotives to the Great Western Railway and the London, Midland and Scottish Railway in the form of the GWR 5700 Class, the GWR 9400 Class and the LMS Fowler Class 3F.

During World War II, Bagnalls was subcontracted work on the Hunslet Austerity 0-6-0ST, which resulted in 52 being manufactured from 1943 to 1947.

The Great Western Railway Bagnall GWR 9400 Class was numbered 8400–8449 and numbers 8400 to 8406 were employed on the former L.M.S. system at Bromsgrove, giving banking assistance on the Lickey Incline.

Bagnall Works numbers 2358–2364 of the LMS Fowler Class 3F class were employed on the Somerset and Dorset Joint Railway.

LMS Fowler Class 3F No. 16539 (In the LMS 1934 renumbering scheme it became No.7456) was built by Bagnall in 1926 was one of two locomotives regauged by the London, Midland and Scottish Railway for the Northern Counties Committee, the other locomotive was built by Hunslet Engine Company of Leeds which lasted until 1963, the Bagnall lasted until 1956 when a suspect crank pin led to her early withdrawal.

The Victor/Vulcan 2994-6 locomotives were ordered by the Steel Company of Wales (SCOW) for their Abbey, Margam and Port Talbot works in 1950. They had a whole range of advanced features, such as 18" X 26" cylinders, together with piston valves, roller-type big-end and side-rod bearings, manganese steel axle-box and horn plate liners, hopper ashpans, self-cleaning smokeboxes, rocking grates and Lambets wet sanding. Steel fireboxes were used as well as "Owens" patent poppet valve and balanced regulator valves though surprisingly the locomotives weren't fitted with superheating. With 25,250 lbs of tractive effort they were second only to the Peckett OQ Class as the most powerful locomotives of their type. In later life 2994 and 2996 were sold to the Austin Motor Company and were named 'Victor' and 'Vulcan'. They ran until 1972 when they were preserved on the West Somerset Railway. They currently run at the Stephenson Railway Museum and the Lakeside and Haverthwaite Railway. 2995 was sold to NCB at the same time for use at a colliery and was scrapped in 1967.

== Diesel locomotives ==
Bagnalls produced diesel locomotives of their own design starting in 1933. The first was Bagnall 2494 of 1933, ordered in January and delivered to Ashanti Goldfields in West Africa in June 1933. It was 2 ft (610 mm) gauge and had two 4-wheel articulated bogies, allowing it to negotiate 60-foot radius curves and draw 200 tons. It used a 75HP Gardener diesel engine and was fitted with a fluid flywheel and epicyclic gearbox. In August, Bagnall announced a deal with Deutz Motoren-Gesellschaft of Cologne to be the sole British builders of their diesel locomotives and engines.

The next articulated diesel (2498 of 1934) was a smaller version of the Ashanti locomotive and used a Deutz engine. It was built for Halkyn District United Mines Ltd., Bryn Owel, Flintshire where it was used underground on the 2-mile 'main-line'. 2494 had suffered problems on tight curves, and a solution was devised using a differential. Three further engines were built for Ashanti with this modified design (2514 of 1934, 2546 of 1936 and 2568 of 1937), and a new gearbox was supplied for 2494. While the Halkyn engine was scrapped in 1937, the Ashanti engines had remarkably long lives.

Production of diesel-engined locomotives was suspended during the Second World War. After the war, Bagnall resumed building diesels, extending and re-tooling the works in 1948 to handle the production of diesel-electric locomotives, with the first locomotive supplied 1950 for the Steel Co of Wales, Port Talbot. This was followed by an order of 25 1000 hp diesel-electric mainline locos fitted with Mirlees V12 engines for the Ceylon Government Railway as their M1 class, the last of which was withdrawn in 1983. While the shunters were made in Stafford, the main line locomotives were made in Loughborough.

Other examples include the New Zealand TR class locomotive of which W.G Bagnall built seven in 1956–57.

== Electric locomotives ==
Bagnall also manufactured electric locomotives. Bagnalls worked with Siemens at the Siemens Stafford works to supply the electrical equipment for the locomotives.

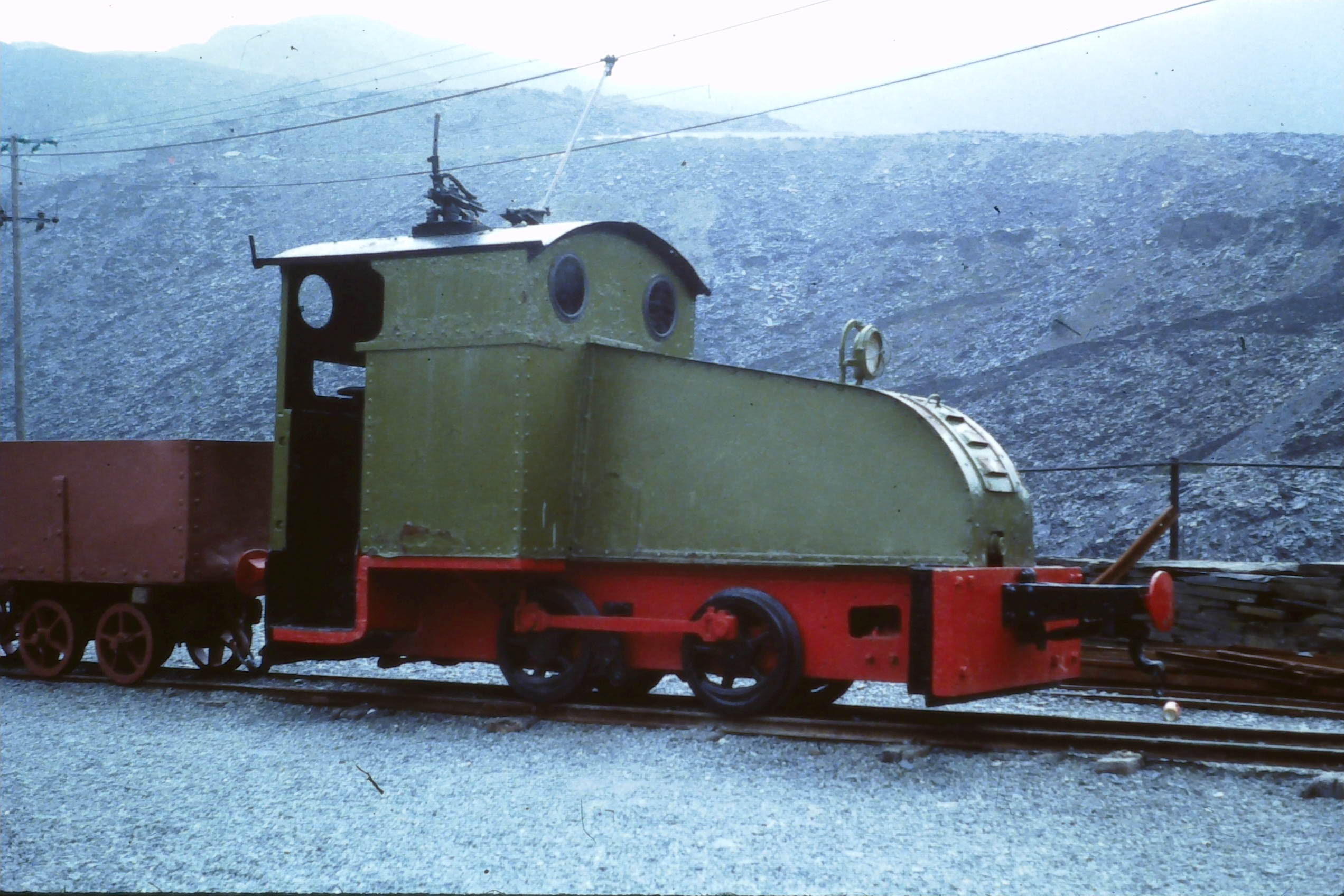
"The Eclipse" at Llechwedd slate mine in 1983

Two Bagnall steam locomotives were converted to overhead electric for the Greaves Llechwedd slate mine. These were Margaret (works no. 1445 of 1895) which was converted in 1927 to become The Eclipse, and Edith (works no. 1278 of 1890) which was converted in 1930 and renamed The Coalition. As of 2026, The Eclipse was at the Statfold Barn Railway, whilst The Coalition was at a private site undergoing restoration to running order, using battery power.

== Paraffin locomotives ==
Paraffin locomotives were one of Bagnall's specialities and appear in most catalogues that Bagnall created.

== Scale models ==
There are few W.G. Bagnall RTR (ready to run) locomotives and kit locomotives. Here are a few examples.

Bachmann Branchline currently produce the OO gauge version of the LMS Fowler Class 3F which Bagnall built and Bachmann are currently manufacturing the Somerset and Dorset Joint Railway liveried Fowler 3F which has been correctly numbered to number 23 which is a number of one of the Bagnall 3Fs, it also features printed Bagnall name plates.

Mercian Models produce possibly Bagnall's most advanced locomotive to date in 7mm scale (O gauge) The Victor/Vulcan locomotives are in two forms; the complete kit which features the body kit, frames, detailing, motor, gearbox and wheels, and the kit only option which features everything except the motor, gearbox and wheels.

A Bagnall inspired 5" gauge live steam locomotive, known as the Sweet Pea, was designed by Jack Buckler, with the first drawings published in the magazine Engineering in Miniature in 1981. Later a 7.25"/7.5" gauge variant known as a Sweet William was created.

In 2014, Hornby introduced a representation of a preserved four-wheeled Diesel shunter into their budget Railroad range utilising the body from "Dart" from the Thomas The Tank Engine range.

== Gallery ==
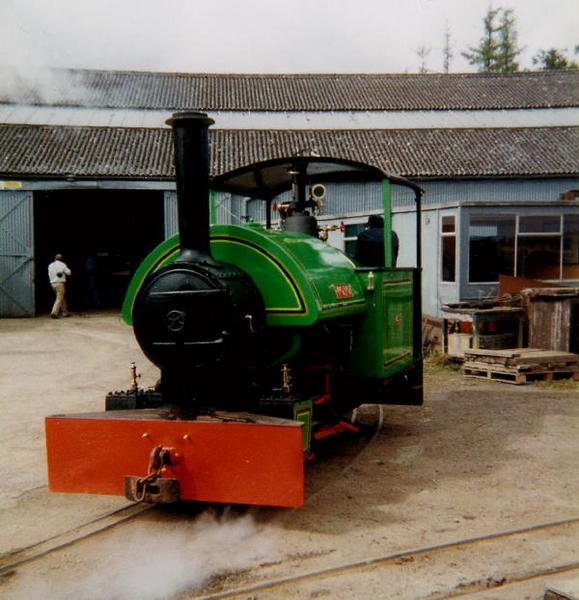
0-4-0ST Woto at Alan Keef Ltd., 1999

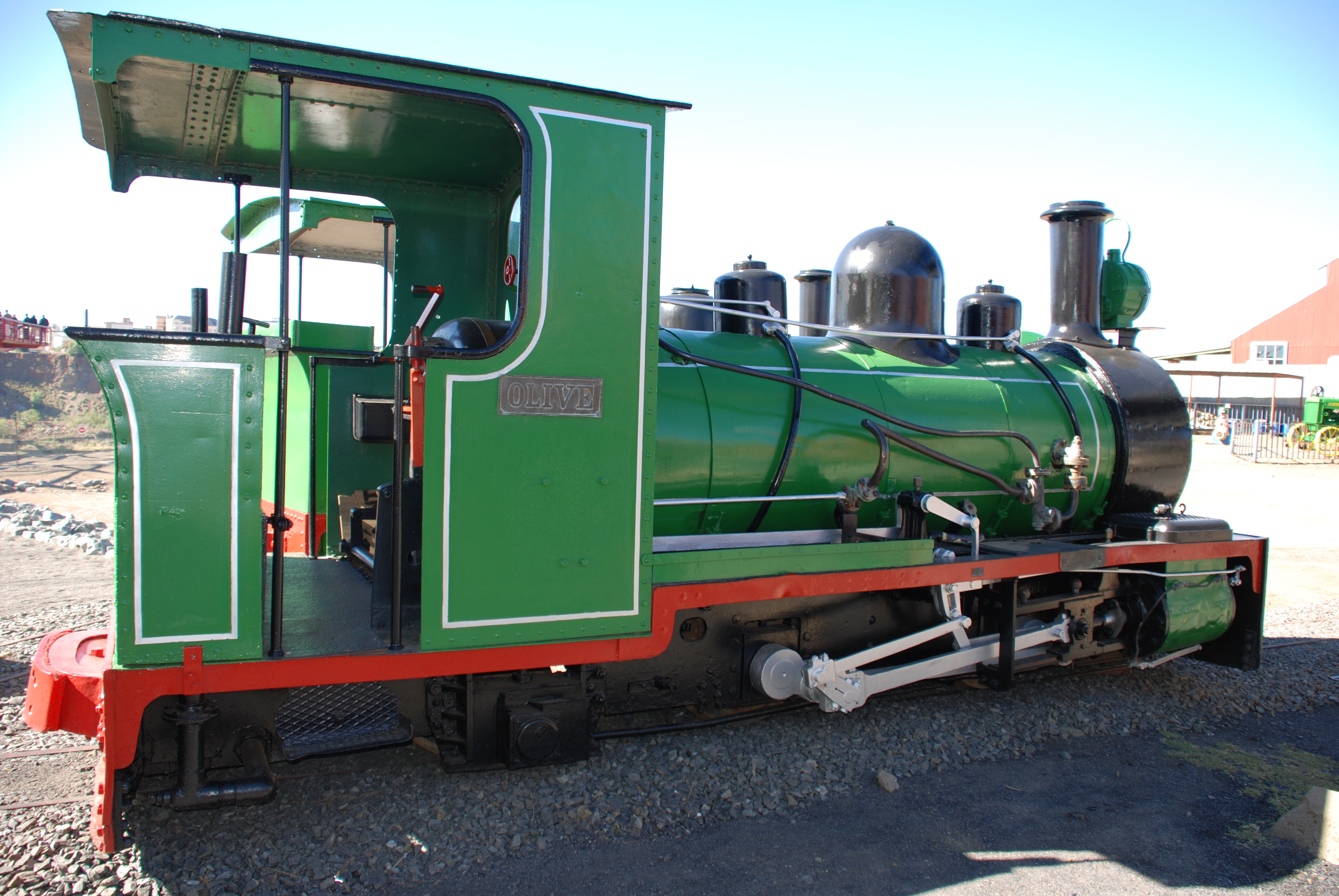
0-4-2WT Olive, an 18 in (457 mm) gauge locomotive, at the Kimberley Mine Museum, 2007

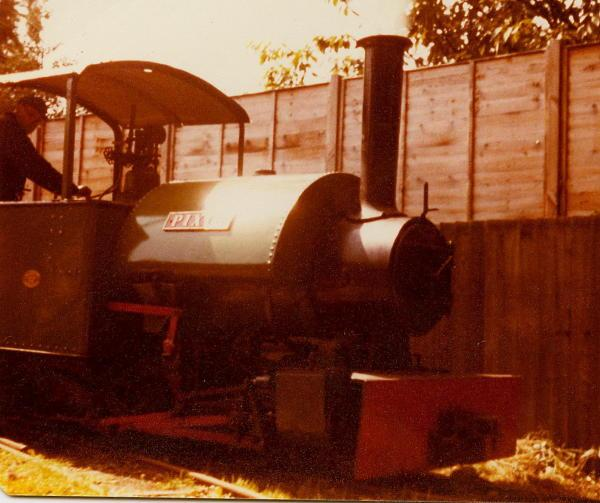
Saddle tank narrow gauge locomotive no 2090 Pixie, on the Cadeby Light Railway in 1981

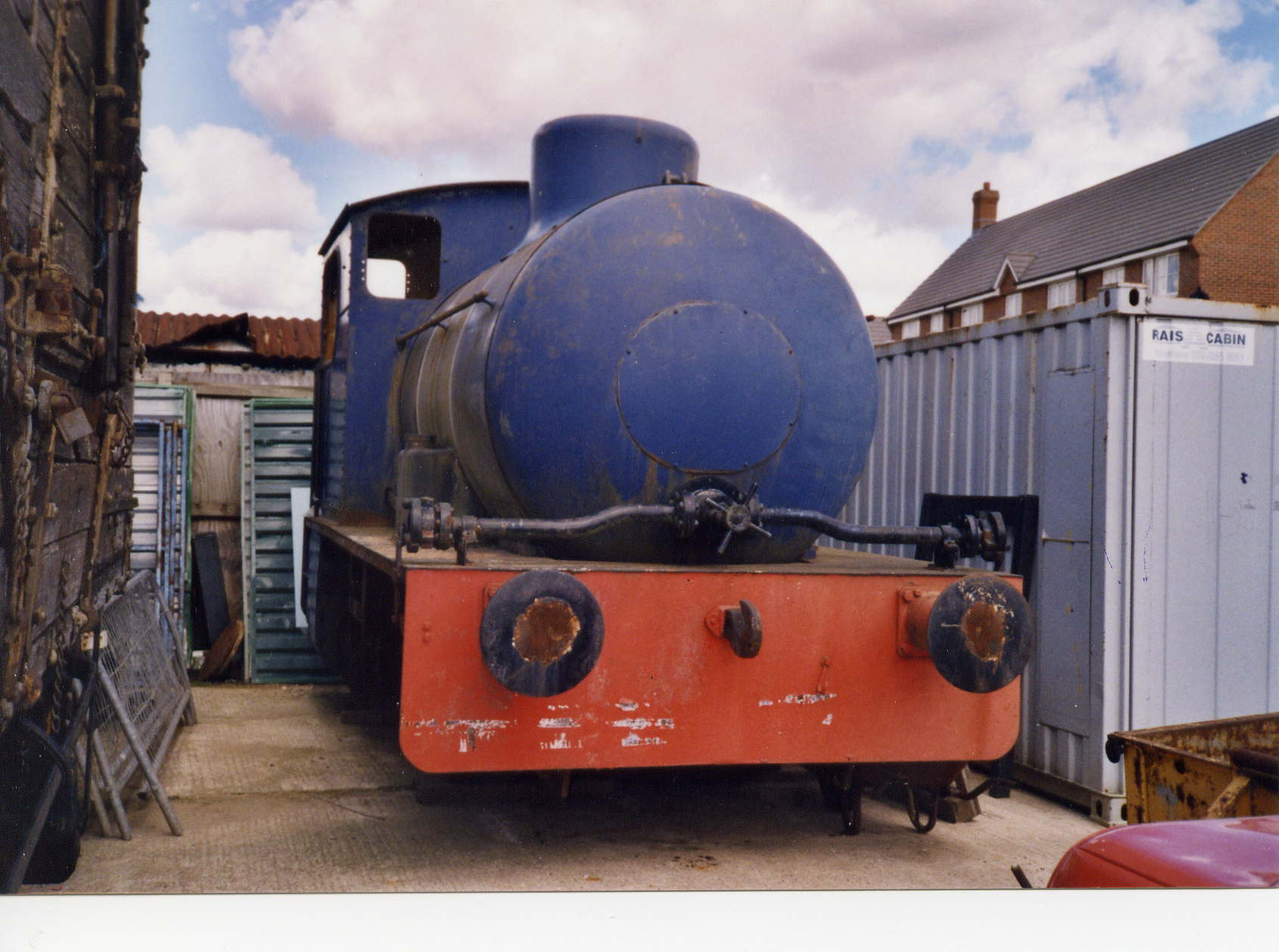
Huntley & Palmers No.1, Bagnall 0-4-0F preserved at Cholsey and Wallingford Railway

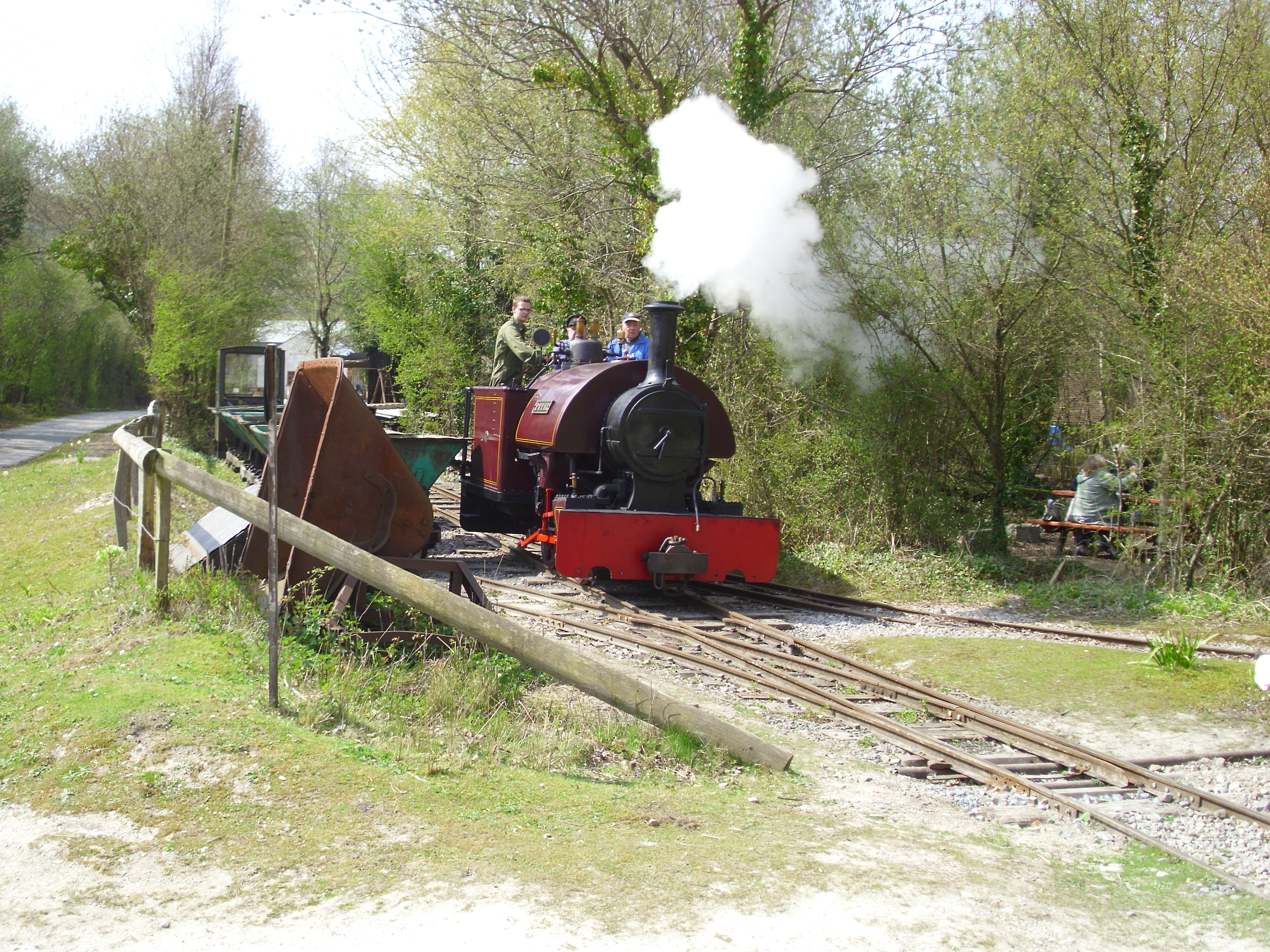
0-4-0ST 2067/1917 'Peter' on the pottery line on the Amberley Museum Railway.

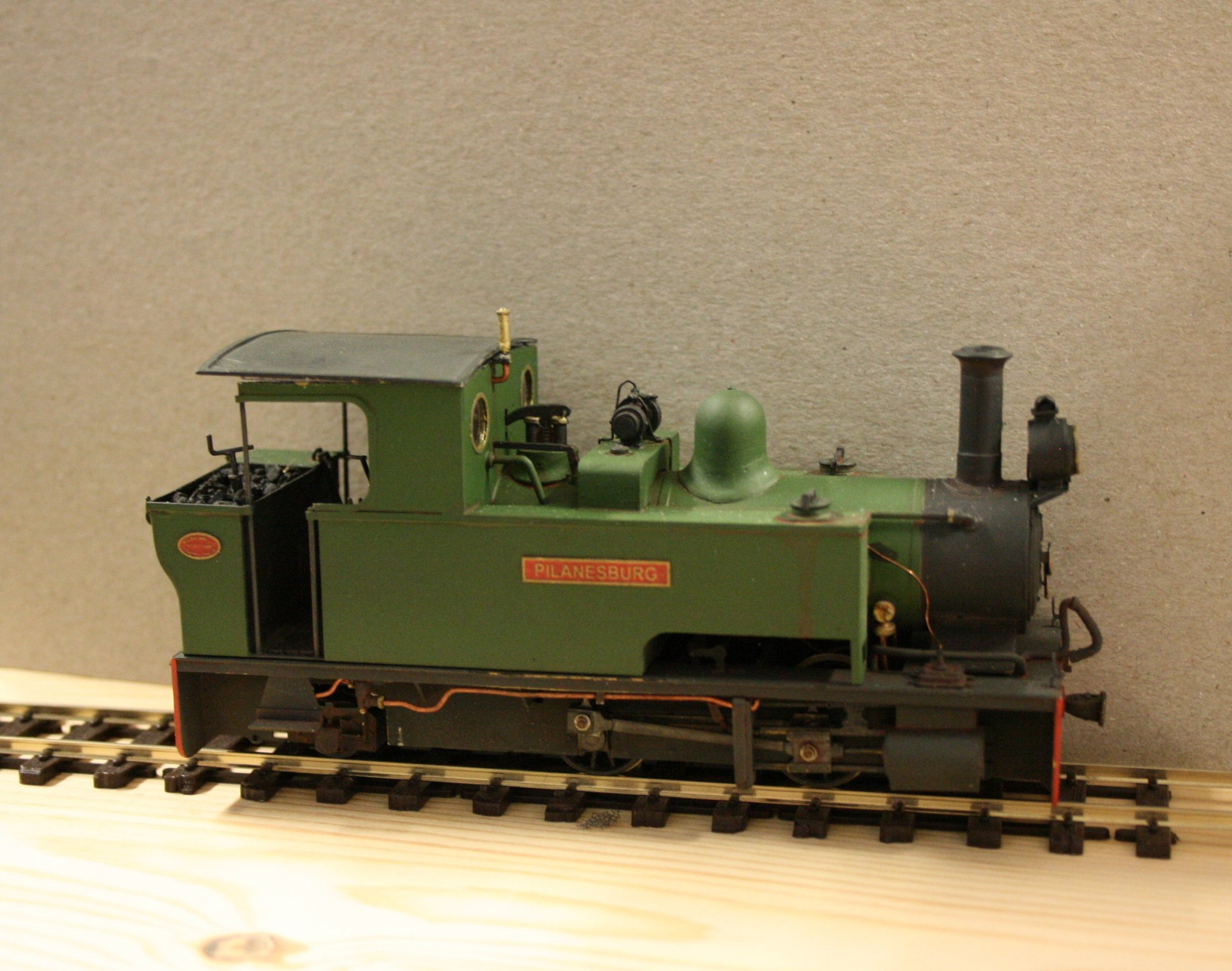
An O16.5 model based on a Bagnall 0-4-2T design

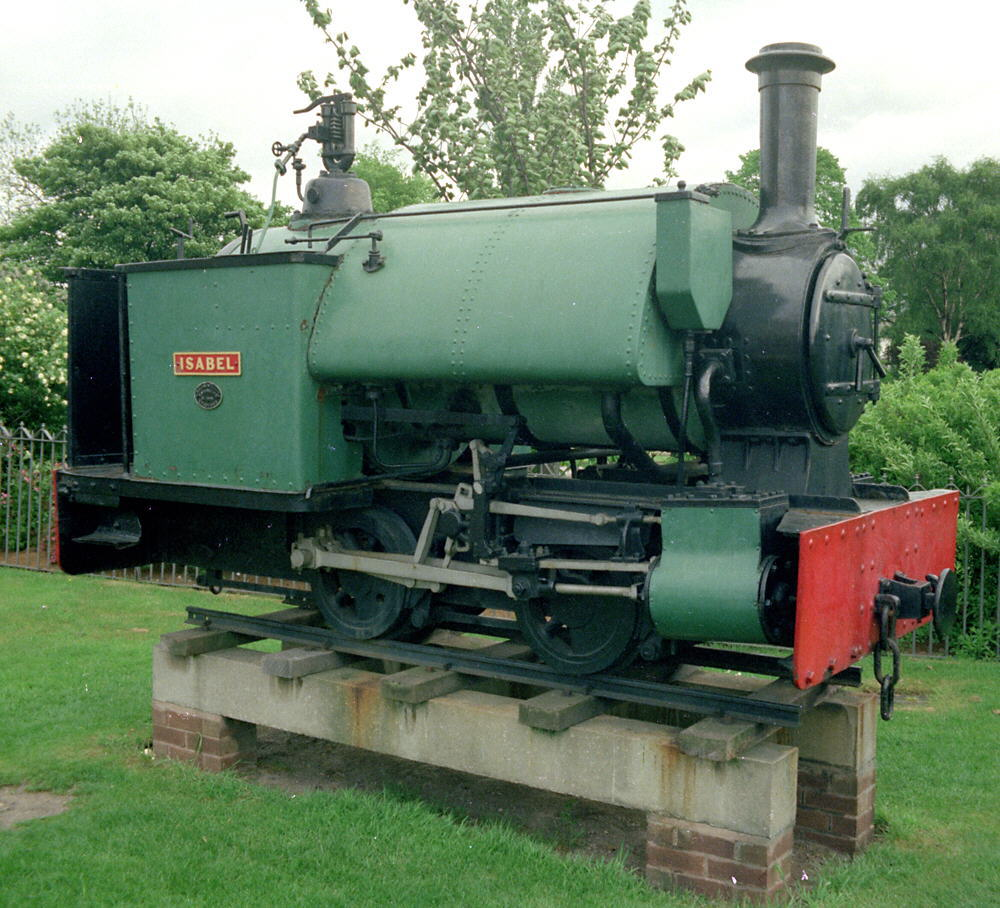
Cliffe Hill Mineral Railway locomotive Isabel, preserved on a plinth in Stafford in 1974. Now running at Amerton Railway.

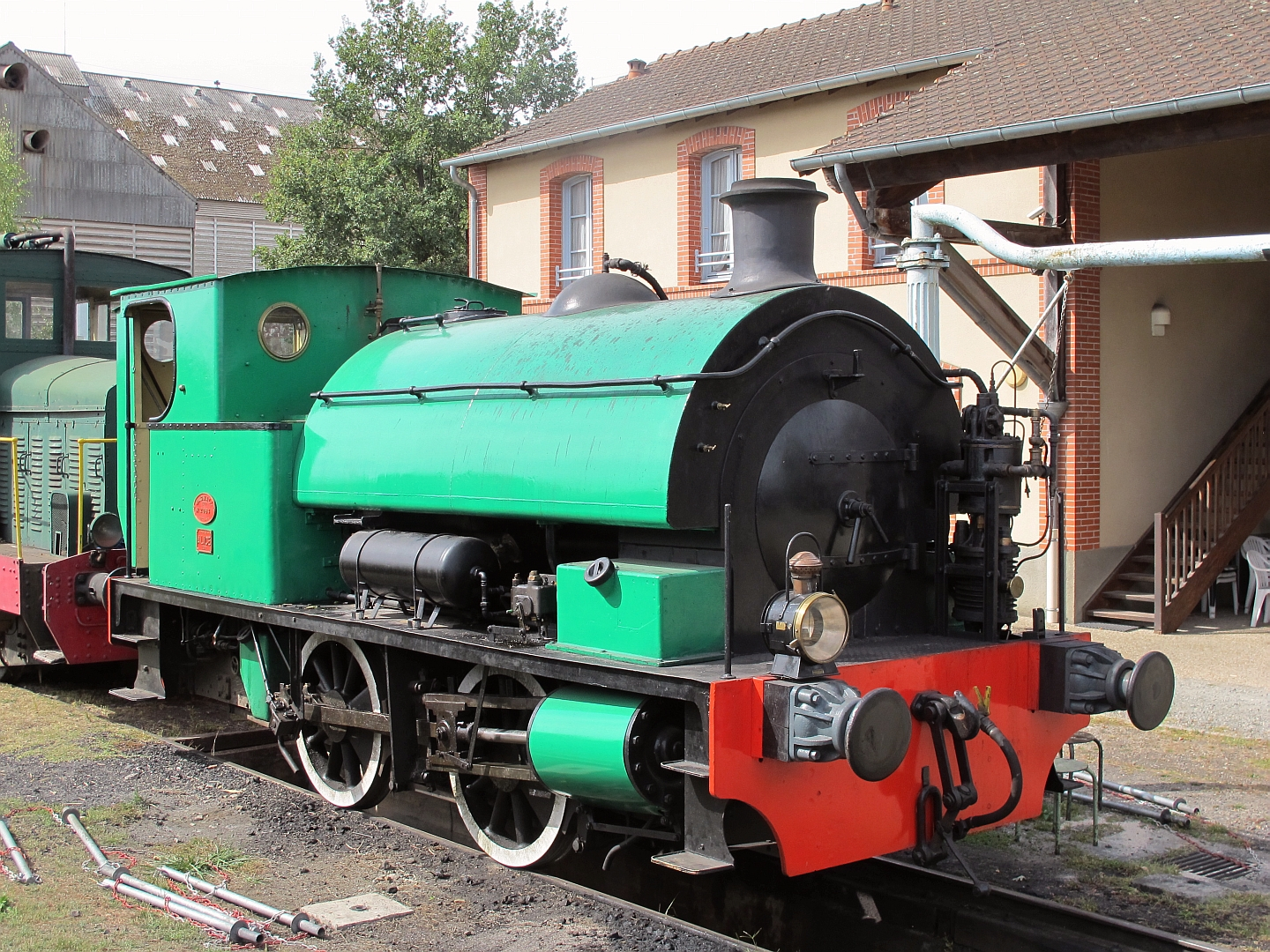
Standard-gauge 0-4-0ST 2064 of 1917 preserved in France on the Sarthe Tourist Railway.

== Preservation ==
Location	Name	Works Number	Built	Arrangement	Gauge	Notes
Statfold Barn Railway	Edith / The Eclipse	1278	1890	0-4-0 electric	2 ft (610 mm)	Originally an 0-4-0ST for the Llechwedd slate quarry, this engine was converted to overhead electric power in 1927 and renamed.
Private site	Margaret / The Coalition	1445	1895	0-4-0 electric	2 ft (610 mm)	Originally an 0-4-0ST for the Llechwedd slate quarry, this engine was converted to overhead electric power in 1927 and renamed. In 2026 it was moved to a private site for restoration to working order, powered by batteries.
Groudle Glen Railway	Sea Lion	1486	1896	2-4-0T	2 ft (610 mm)	Originally built for the Groudle Glen Railway and operated in the glen until the Second World War. She was then left to rust outside the engine shed, and used for spare parts for Polar Bear until after the railway ceased operating in 1963. The rusted locomotive was rescued from the glen, and following a number of years as a static exhibit she was rebuilt as an Apprentice training project by British Nuclear Fuels at Sellafield in 1987 and returned to service on the Groudle Glen Railway in 1987, which in the meantime had been restored by a group of volunteers.
Amerton Railway	Isabel	1491	1897	0-4-0ST	2 ft (610 mm)	a typical Bagnall narrow gauge loco — this locomotive was for many years on public display opposite Stafford Railway Station before it was restored to use.
Bala Lake Railway	Dorothy	1568	1899	0-4-0ST	2 ft (610 mm)	One of three locomotives built for the Llechwedd slate quarry. The other two (1278 & 1445) were converted to overhead electric power, this one was dismantled and left in the quarry until 1972. After restoration, it returned to steam in 2026.
Usina São João in Santa Rita, PB	USJ #3 "João Felipe"	1737	1903	0-4-0ST+T	3 ft 3 3/8 in (1,000 mm)	Unmounted.
Amberley Museum Railway	Polar Bear	1781	1905	2-4-0T	2 ft (610 mm)	Originally built for the Groudle Glen Railway on the Isle of Man, Polar Bear was acquired by the Brockham Museum Trust soon after the GGR closed. Her sister engine, Sea Lion, still works on the GGR. Polar Bear came to Amberley Museum and Heritage Centre when the Brockham collection was transferred there in 1982. Currently under overhaul after being withdrawn from service in 1982.
Usina Santa Tereza in Goiana, PE	"Santa Tereza" (ex "Catu"; unnumbered)	1981	1913	0-4-2T	2 ft 5 1/2 in (750 mm)	Operated before at Usina Nossa Senhora das Maravilhas, also in the state of Pernambuco, where her name used to be "Catu".
Rambagh Palace Hotel, Jaipur, India	4	2009	1914	0-6-4T	2 ft 6 in (762 mm)	Originally Burdwan–Katwa Railway No. 4 S. C. Ghose (Part of the McLeods Light Railways group)
Statfold Barn Railway		2029	1916	2-6-2T	2 ft 6 in (762 mm)	AK16 Ex Katwa Indian Railways
Amberley Museum Railway	Peter	2067	1917	0-4-0ST	2 ft (610 mm)	Peter was built as a 3 ft gauge engine for the Canadian Forestry Commission. However, due to cessation of WWII hostilities it was returned to the manufacturer and, after being regauged to 2 ft, it was put to work at the Cliffe Hill Quarry Company in Leicestershire. It worked here until 1949 when it was stored out of service. Peter was then acquired by the Narrow Gauge Railway Society and eventually came to Amberley with the Brockham Collection along with Polar Bear. Currently in service.
Bressingham Steam Museum	Armistice	2088	1919	0-4-0ST	2 ft (610 mm)	Birmingham, Tame & Rea District Drainage Board Railway, Minworth, England
Bursledon Brickworks	Wendy	2091	1919	0-4-0ST	2 ft (610 mm)	Wendy is a 2 ft gauge Quarry Bagnall formerly used at the Dorothea Quarry in North Wales. She is currently based at the Hampshire Narrow Gauge Railway Trust's Bursledon Brickworks base.
Apedale Valley Light Railway	Woto	2133	1924	0-4-0ST	2 ft (610 mm)	New as 3 ft 6 in gauge loco for the British Insulated Callender Cables Ltd in Kent. Regauged in 1988, moved to Apedale in 2024.
Welshpool and Llanfair Light Railway	Conqueror	2192	1922	0-6-2T	2 ft 6 in (762 mm)	ex Bowaters Paper Railway and Great Whipsnade Railway
Foxfield Light Railway	Lewisham	2221	1927	0-6-0ST	4 ft 8 1/2 in (1,435 mm)	built for the Shropshire Beet Sugar Company at Alscott, near Wellington
Hong Kong Railway Museum	17BG	2227	1928	0-4-4T	2 ft (610 mm)	ex Sha Tau Kok Railway
Vale of Rheidol Railway	18BG	2228	1928	0-4-4T	2 ft (610 mm)	ex Sha Tau Kok Railway
Welsh Highland Railway	Sinembe	2287	1927	4-4-0T	2 ft (610 mm)	built for the Tongaat Sugar Estates, Natal.
Muzium Negara	FMSR No. 13 → MR 321.01	2323	1928	0-6-2T	3 ft 6 in (1,067 mm)	One of five lightweight shunters used on the wharves in Port Swettenham and Singapore. Originally owned by the Federated Malay States Railways and Malayan Railways. Sold to Pan-Malayan Cement in 1965 and painted green, but returned to MR and cosmetically restored with black MR livery in 1972. Placed on display beside Muzium Negara in 1973.
Pallot Heritage Steam Museum, Jersey		2450	1931	0-4-0ST	4 ft 8 1/2 in (1,435 mm)	Built for Courtaulds Aber works, Flint, Flintshire, North Wales
Vale of Rheidol Railway		2457	1932	4-6-2	2 ft (610 mm)	Gwalior Pacific No 765
Vale of Rheidol Railway		2460	1932	4-6-2	2 ft (610 mm)	Gwalior Pacific No 762
Bradford, West Yorkshire	Huntley & Palmers No. 1	2473	1932	0-4-0F	4 ft 8 1/2 in (1,435 mm)	Fireless locomotive
East Anglian Railway Museum	Jubilee	2542	1936	0-4-0	4 ft 8 1/2 in (1,435 mm)	Built for Bowaters Paper Railway. Returned to traffic in 2016, painted in lined light green.
Vale of Rheidol Railway		2545	1936	0-4-4-0T	600 mm (1 ft 11 5/8 in)	ex Renishaw Sugar Mill, South Africa
Bodmin and Wenford Railway	Judy	2572	1937	0-4-0ST	4 ft 8 1/2 in (1,435 mm)	
Mangapps Railway Museum	Brookfield	2613	1940	0-6-0PT	4 ft 8 1/2 in (1,435 mm)	No 2613 was originally designed as a narrow gauge locomotive to go to work in the coal fields in Turkey. But just as construction was starting it was commandeered as part of the war effort and built as standard gauge. It is currently being overhauled at Mangapps Railway Museum in Essex
Foxfield Light Railway	Hawarden	2623	1940	0-4-0ST	4 ft 8 1/2 in (1,435 mm)	built for Butterley Company's steelworks, Ripley, Derbyshire
Chasewater Railway	Dunlop No. 6	2648	1940	0-4-0ST	4 ft 8 1/2 in (1,435 mm)	the first of a batch of 9 supplied to the Ministry of Supply for use at Royal Ordnance Factories
Rushden, Higham & Wellingborough Railway	Cherwell	2654	1942	0-6-0ST	4 ft 8 1/2 in (1,435 mm)	built for the Byfield Ironstone Co's quarry
Plym Valley Railway	Byfield	2655	1942	0-6-0ST	4 ft 8 1/2 in (1,435 mm)	Built to work at Byfield Ironstone Quarry in Northamptonshire. Overhaul is expected to start very soon
Rutland Railway Museum	Cranford No. 2	2668	1942	0-6-0ST	4 ft 8 1/2 in (1,435 mm)	Awaiting overhaul, boiler ticket expired in 2006.
East Anglian Railway Museum	Lamport No. 3	2670	1942	0-6-0ST	4 ft 8 1/2 in (1,435 mm)	One of a batch of 6 similar locomotives supplied to the Staveley Coal and Iron Company. Overhaul in progress, repairs to bunker and cab completed. Main effort is now concentrated on overhauling the boiler including replacing the old steel firebox with a new all welded replacement.
Bodmin and Wenford Railway		2766	1944	0-6-0ST	4 ft 8 1/2 in (1,435 mm)	J94 class
Cripple Creek and Victor Narrow Gauge Railroad	No. 4	2831	1947	0-4-4-0T	2 ft (610 mm)	Located in Cripple Creek, Colorado, United States, and used as season tourist train in one of Colorado's old mining districts
Chasewater Railway	No. 2	2842	1946	0-4-0ST	4 ft 8 1/2 in (1,435 mm)	built for the Kent Electric Power Company at Littlebrook Power Station, near Dartford
Vale of Rheidol Railway		2895	1948	0-4-2ST	2 ft (610 mm)	Built for the Rustenburg Platinum Mines in South Africa
Bodmin and Wenford Railway	No. 19	2962	1950	0-4-0ST	4 ft 8 1/2 in (1,435 mm)	
Stephenson Railway Museum	Vulcan	2994	1950	0-6-0	4 ft 8 1/2 in (1,435 mm)	Originally named "Vulcan" and numbered 401 it was part of a batch of three built for the Steel Company of Wales, they were used at their Abbey, Margam and Port Talbot Steelworks. Replaced by diesels in 1957, 2994 and 2996 were sold in September to the Austin Motor Company of Longbridge plant, Birmingham. No.402 went to the N.C.B. in South Wales, and was scrapped in 1967. Sold to the West Somerset Railway, 401 and 403 become the core of the WSR's early motive power. Replaced by authentic GWR locomotives, 401 was sold to the Stephenson Railway Museum, where it was renamed "Thomas Burt MP" and worked until 2009. Re-entered service in April 2019 after a lengthy overhaul, renamed back to "Vulcan". 403 was sold to the Lakeside and Haverthwaite Railway.
Lakeside and Haverthwaite Railway	No 403 Victor	2996	1950	0-6-0	4 ft 8 1/2 in (1,435 mm)	Under restoration at the Lakeside and Haverthwaite Railway
Statfold Barn Railway	Isaac	3023	1953	0-4-2T	2 ft (610 mm)	Built for the Rustenburg Platinum Mines in South Africa.
Welshpool and Llanfair Light Railway	Monarch	3024	1953	0-4-4-0T	2 ft 6 in (762 mm)	built for the Bowaters Paper Railway in Kent. This was last narrow gauge steam locomotive built for industrial service in the UK.
Welsh Highland Railway	Gelert	3050	1953	0-4-2T	2 ft (610 mm)	Built for the Rustenburg Platinum Mines in South Africa.
Bodmin and Wenford Railway	Alfred	3058	1953	0-4-0ST	4 ft 8 1/2 in (1,435 mm)	
Foxfield Light Railway	Florence No. 2	3059	1954	0-6-0ST	4 ft 8 1/2 in (1,435 mm)	built for the NCB North Staffordshire Area
Bodmin and Wenford Railway		3121	1957	0-4-0F	4 ft 8 1/2 in (1,435 mm)	Rare fireless locomotive
Vale of Rheidol Railway		3124	1957	0-6-0	2 ft (610 mm)	Diesel locomotive built for Rustenburg Platinum Mines, South Africa
Foxfield Light Railway	Leys	3027	1961	0-4-0DH	4 ft 8 1/2 in (1,435 mm)	the last-but-one locomotive built by W G Bagnall

== See also ==
- Bagnall fireless locomotives (preserved)
- Bagnall 0-4-0ST "Alfred" and "Judy"
- Bagnall boiler
