= Brockham Railway Museum =

Former railway museum in Surrey, England

- Established: 1962
- Dissolved: 1982
- Location: Surrey, England
- Coordinates: 51°14′42″N 0°17′10″W

The Brockham Railway Museum was a 2 ft (610 mm) narrow gauge railway based at the site of the Brockham Limeworks, near Dorking, Surrey. When it closed in 1982, the majority of the collection was moved to the Amberley Museum & Heritage Centre where it formed the nucleus of the Amberley Museum Railway.

== History ==
In 1960, the Dorking Greystone Lime Co. of Betchworth, Surrey, was disposing of its railway stock. The company's general manager, Major Taylerson, was keen to see the locomotives preserved. The London Area Group of the Narrow Gauge Railway Society (NGRS) purchased one of the pair of 3 ft 2 1/4 in (972 mm) gauge Fletcher Jennings tank locos, Townsend Hook. This was placed on display at Sheffield Park on the embryonic Bluebell Railway. However this was not a particularly satisfactory arrangement, and efforts were made to find an alternative home.

In October 1961, members of the NGRS visited the disused chalk pit of Brockham Lime & Hearthstone Co. Ltd. The site was deemed suitable, and arrangements were made to establish a museum there, less than a mile west of the site of the Dorking Greystone Lime Co. The site was cleared in early 1962. Townsend Hook moved there in May 1962, and was followed a week later by the two Orenstein & Koppel diesel locos from Betchworth: No. 6 Monty and No. 7, named The Major in honour of Major Taylerson. The Brockham Museum Trust was formed as a separate entity from the NGRS to run the museum.

The Peckett locomotive Scaldwell was purchased from Staveley Minerals and moved to the museum on 20 March 1964. The locomotive was steamed the following weekend and driven into the newly refurbished shed - the first and last time it was operated in preservation.

In 1965, Cliffe Hill Granite Co. Ltd. donated Peter, a Bagnall 0-4-0ST built in 1917, with the provision that it had to be put into working order. Peter initially went to the Lincolnshire Coast Light Railway, but moved to Brockham on 21 August. Another Bagnall arrived in 1967, when 2-4-0T Polar Bear was brought over from the Groudle Glen Railway. Brockham was initially offered the entire railway "lock, stock and barrel" for £50 which included both Polar Bear and her sister, Sea Lion (in a dilapidated state), along with all the carriages many of which had been badly vandalised. The plan was to sell rail and surplus equipment for scrap and use that to fund the move, but arranging this on the island proved difficult. The offer was withdrawn before the contract could be completed, and they were then offered the locomotives and any of the carriages. In the end they purchased Polar Bear and two carriages (which had been in a shed and had not been vandalised), along with many spares from Sea Lion, which had been out of use since 1939, to keep Polar Bear in traffic. The museum continued to expand, becoming home to many items in Amberley's current collection.

In 1973 the museum acquired 60 lengths of portable "Jubilee" track and 8 wagons from the Hampton & Kempton Waterworks Railway. In December several locomotives arrived from storage at the Cadeby Light Railway, including the last remaining narrow-gauge locomotive built by the Bedford firm of J&C Howard (works number 982 of 1981).

From 1972 to 1978 the museum was home to many privately owned locomotives and rolling stock. Many of these were owned by Peter Nicholson, Rich Morris, and Michael Jacob who formed Narrow Gauge Enterrprises and arranged to create a museum at Gloddfa Ganol in North Wales. They moved their locomotives out of Brockham on 18 July 1978 in a convoy of 5 trucks.

== Closure ==
The Brockham Museum Association formed an Educational Trust in 1972, with the Association now being a supporters club. This was a step towards the eventual opening of Brockham to the public. However, access to the site via an ungated level crossing was always an issue. Then in 1976 it appeared the lease of the Brockham Limeworks site was unlikely to be renewed when it came up in 1978. This caused the search for a new site, and for a while it was hoped a move to Ravensbury Park in Merton was the answer, but this failed to get outline planning consent. Then in early 1977 Surrey County Council purchased a large tract of land including Brockham limeworks, and discussions indicated a new lease was now likely. However in 1978 Narrow Gauge Enterprises moved their large collection of privately owned locomotives and rolling stock from the site to their new Gloddfa Ganol museum in North Wales.

In 1979 the trustees prepared the "Brockham Museum Development Handbook", a plan for the development of the museum, which among other things would provide information for the landowners, the planning authorities, potential sponsors, and the Museum officials and volunteers. Included in this was the need for a substantial site lease term (21 years minimum), the need for a commitment from Surrey County Council regarding parking arrangements, and the need for appropriate planning consent for change of use to a public museum, and this last issue was to become a problem.

In 1981, planning consent for public museum was again sought from the local authorities and this time it was firmly refused, because the only road access was across an ungated level crossing over the British Railways line from Dorking to Reigate. The Chalk Pits Museum was in its second year. Discussions started in earnest about relocating the Brockham collection to Amberley and amalgamating the aims of the Brockham Museum Trust and the Southern Industrial History Centre Trust. The museum closed in 1982, with most of the remaining items moving to Amberley over the summer.

== Locomotives ==
Locomotives on-site at Brockham in 1982.

Name	Works Number	Type	Gauge	Builder	Year built	Original Operator	Notes
Townsend Hook	172L	0-4-0T	3 ft 2 1/4 in (972 mm)	Fletcher Jennings	1880	Dorking Greystone Lime	
Monty	7269	4wDM	3 ft 2 1/4 in (972 mm)	Orenstein & Koppel	1936	Dorking Greystone Lime	
Scaldwell	1316	0-6-0ST	3 ft (914 mm)	Peckett & Sons	1913	Scaldwell Tramway	Moved to Amberley, then to the Southwold Railway in July 2017, with the plan to return it to steam.
	10161	4wDM	2 ft 11 in (889 mm)	Motor Rail	1950	London Brick Company, Arlesey brickworks, Bedfordshire	
Polar Bear	1781	2-4-0T	2 ft (610 mm)	W.G. Bagnall	1905	Groudle Glen Railway	
Peter	2067	0-4-0ST	2 ft (610 mm)	W.G. Bagnall	1917	Cliffe Hill Mineral Railway	Built as 3 ft (914 mm) gauge, converted to 2 ft (610 mm) in 1919.
LR 2593	872	4wPM	2 ft (610 mm)	Motor Rail	1918	C V Buchan & Co Ltd	
No. 15	1320	4wDM	2 ft (610 mm)	Motor Rail	10 September 1918	War Department Light Railways LR3041	Originally a 'protected' version with Dorman 4JO petrol engine, converted to a diesel before preservation. This was at the Moor Hill gravel pits of Inns & Co. Preserved at Brockham in 1978. Purchased by Ian Jolly in early 1990, then moved to the Cadeby Light Railway on 5 March 1994. Purchased by the Moseley Railway Trust and moved to their Apedale Light Railway on 29 April 2006.
	166024	4wDM	2 ft (610 mm)	Ruston & Hornsby	1933	Colne Valley Water Co, Eastbury Pumping Station, Rickmansworth	
Peldon	21295	4wDM	2 ft (610 mm)	Fowler	1936	Essex Water Authority, Abberton	
Redland	6193	4wDM	2 ft (610 mm)	Orenstein & Koppel	1937	Redland Pipes Ltd., Ripley	
The Major	7741	4wDM	2 ft (610 mm)	Orenstein & Koppel	1937	Dorking Greystone Lime	
	80	2 ft (610 mm)	4wDM	Ransomes and Rapier	1936	Chinnor Cement & Lime	
WD904	3403	2w-2PM	2 ft (610 mm)	Wickham	1943	MoD Eastriggs	Arrived Brockham Oct 1975 together with Wickham 3404 non-powered trailer
	3097	2 ft (610 mm)	4wDM	Hudson Hunslet	1944	Borough of Merton Sewage Works	
	5031	4wBE	2 ft (610 mm)	Wingrove & Rogers	1953	Donatedbt Redland Bricks Lts, Warnham Wealden Works, Sussex	Arrived at Brockham 1978. After move to Amberley was dismantled and used as a source of spares
23	23L	0-4-0T	1 ft 10 in (559 mm)	Wm. Spence & Son	1920	Guinness Brewery, Dublin	Complete with hoist and standard gauge converter bogie. Designed and patented by Samuel Geoghegan, the head of Guinness engineering staff. Made by William Spence & Son of Dublin who made brewing equipment.

The table below lists other locomotives that were at some time at Brockham Museum. Most were privately owned by members of the museum. In the period in which the museum was active there were still industrial narrow gauge railways in Britain, and a small group of people saved some of the rarer examples of locomotives for the future. There were numerous moves of these privately owned locos between different locations as they changed hands or were moved by the owners to different locations to be worked on or stored.

Name	Works Number	Type	Gauge	Builder	Year built	Original Operator	Notes
Kathleen	106	0-4-0VBT	1 ft 10 3/4 in (578 mm)	De Winton	1877	Penrhyn quarry railway	Saved in 1961. Owned by Alan Keef, then Walcroft Bros 1968, then Pete Nicholson when at Brockham Railway Museum in the early 1970s.Moved to Longfield, Kent for restoration in August 1973, later moved to Gloddfa Ganol, now in Vale of Rheidol Railway museum collection.
Llanfair		0-4-0VBT	3 ft (914 mm)	De Winton	1895	Penmaenmawr granite quarry	Partially restored at Brockham Railway Museum in the 1970s, later moved to Gloddfa Ganol, and then on display on a plinth at Dinas Station on the Welsh Highland Railway
	16306	4wBE	2 ft (610 mm)	Brush Electrical Engineering	1917		Ex HM’s Explosives Factory at Queensferry, then Manod Slate Quarries. Moved to Gloddfa Ganol in 1978. Bodywork framing was used to restore 16303.
LR3101	1381	4wPM	2 ft (610 mm)	Motor Rail	1918	War Department Light Railway	Protected version owned by J. Townsend. Restored as Open Version. Left Brockham for restoration in Herefordshire in May 1970. Recently at Amberley Chalk Pits Museum
	1568	4wPM	2 ft (610 mm)	Hibberd	1927	APCM Murston Brickworks, Kent	Purchased by Pete Nicholson and moved to Brockham Railway Museum in February 1972. The oldest surviving Hibberd loco. In 1978 moved to Gloddfa Ganol, and more recently at Leighton Buzzard Light Railway.
Python	4470	4wPM	600 mm (1 ft 11 5/8 in)	Orenstein & Koppel	1930		Purchased by P.D. Nicholson from Gillingham Pottery Brick & Tile Co and moved to Brockham in Feb 1971, later moving to Gloddfa Ganol. Now with Moseley Railway Trust at Apedale.
	982	4wPM	2 ft (610 mm)	Howards	1931	Whittlesea Central brickworks	The only remaining narrow-gauge locomotive built by Howards. Preserved in 1970 at the Cadeby Light Railway. Move to Brockham in 1973, then to Gloddfa Ganol in 1978. Sold in 2007 to a member of the Moseley Railway Trust where restored.
1747	1747	4wPM	2 ft (610 mm)	Hibberd	1931		Purchased by Pete Nicholson and moved to Brockham Railway Museum in February 1974. In 1978 moved to Gloddfa Ganol.
	3916	4wPM	2 ft (610 mm)	R A Lister and Company	1931	Tarmac Ltd, Wolverhampton	Worked at Dorothea Slate Quarry before preservation in 1970. Arrived at Brockham Oct 1970, moved to Gloddfa Ganol c1978. In storage at Long Eaton. More lately at Twyford Waterways Trust.
	45913	4wPet/Par	2 ft 6 in (762 mm)	Robert Hudson Ltd	1932	Ex-Midhurst Whites Ltd	Arrived Brockham March 1972, owner Rich Morris. In 1978 moved to Gloddfa Ganol, and later to Amberley Chalk Pits Museum
164350	164350	4wDM	2 ft (610 mm)	Ruston & Hornsby	1933		Purchased by Michael Jacobs from Enfield Sewage Works in 1966. Moved to Brockham in February 1974. In 1978 moved to Gloddfa Ganol.
	166015	4wDM	2 ft (610 mm)	Ruston & Hornsby	1933	Colne Valley Water Co, Eastbury Pumping Station, Rickmansworth	Arrived Feb 1968. Shortly after arrival it was sold to an undisclosed buyer in "the South of England" - it remained at Brockham but was the victim of a theft from the site in April 1969 when it was reported that the underframe and engine of 166015 (among other things) had been stolen. It was presumably written off as a result, as it is not mentioned in later reports.
	1830	4wPM	2 ft (610 mm)	Hibberd	1933	E. Rochford & Sons, The Nurseries, Stanstead, Essex	Moved to Brockham Dec 1968 from Boothby Peat Co owned by P. Nicholson, marked as temporarily off-site for restoration in Jan 1973 Brockham Museum stocklist. In 2021 under restoration at Westonzoyland Pumping Station Museum, Somerset.
LM11	1082/1348	0-4-0DM	3 ft (914 mm)	Ruhrthaler	1934	Peat Fuel Company, Lullymore, County Kildare, Ireland	Purchased by Michael Jacob in 1973 and moved to Brockham in December. Later purchased by Rich Morris and in 1978 moved to Gloddfa Ganol, then later via Alan Keef c2004 to the Cavan and Leitrim Railway at Dromod. Originally thought to be 1082, but later found to be 1348 of 1934/5. LM11 is the oldest survining Bord na Móna locomotive.
	6299	4wPM	2 ft (610 mm)	R A Lister and Company	1935	John Board & Co Ltd, Dunball Portland cement and lime works near Bridgwater, Somerset	Purchased by Peter Nicholson in 1968. Stored at Brockham in the 1970s, moved to Gloddfa Ganol in 1978. More lately at Westonzoyland Pumping Station Museum, Somerset.
Little George	1298	4wPM	2 ft (610 mm)	Wingrove & Rogers	c1935		Moved to Gloddfa Ganol in 1978. More lately at Moseley Narrow Gauge Industrial Tramway, Tumbly Down Farm, Redruth.
Layer	21294	4wDM	2 ft (610 mm)	Fowler	1936	Essex Water Authority, Abberton	Unrestored. Remains moved to Great Bush Railway later to Leeds Industrial Museum at Armley Mills
	174535	4wDM	2 ft (610 mm)	Ruston & Hornsby	1936		Purchased by J Crosskeys from Maenofferen. Moved to Brockham Oct 1975. 2021 at Chasewater Railway. Left Brockham for storage in late 1975/ early 1976
	5713	4wDM	2 ft (610 mm)	Motor Rail	1936	Staveley Coal and Iron Co. Ltd., Campbell Brickyard	Purchased by A. Wilson, from BSC Stanton Ironworks, bought by J Crosskeys and moved from storage to Brockham April 1975. Left Brockham for storage in late 1975/ early 1976 Later Wey Valley Railway. In 2021 at Old Kiln Light Railway
	2025	4wDM	2 ft (610 mm)	Hibberd	1937		Moved to Brockham Aug 1972 from Clowbridge Reservoir, Nr Burnley, Lancs. In 1978 moved to Gloddfa Ganol where it remained until 1998, now being restored at the Amerton Railway
	9256	4wPM	2 ft (610 mm)	R A Lister and Company	1937		This loco is still preserved, and in 2015 appeared at Amberley Museum when it was among a gathering of 12 Lister's coupled together to pull a train.
	7728	4wDM	2 ft 6 in (762 mm)	Orenstein & Koppel	1938		Purchased by P.D. Nicholson and moved to Brockham in 1976
C13	2449	2w-2PM	3 ft (914 mm)	Wickham	1938		From the Bord na Mona Lullymore Works in County Kildare. Moved to Brockham in December 1973 (chassis only). Later moved to Gloddfa Ganol.
	2201	4wDM	2 ft (610 mm)	Hibberd	1939		In 1978 moved to Gloddfa Ganol, lately at the Devon Railway Centre
	7603	4wDM	2 ft (610 mm)	Motor Rail	1939		Recorded as being at Redland Pipes with OK 6193 in April 1971, and both moved to Brockham in April 1974 along with track and wagons. It is not in the May 1975 stocklist.
	2176	4wDM	2 ft (610 mm)	Hudson Hunslet	1940	Ministry of Supply	From Burton Construction Co
	18557	4wPM	2 ft (610 mm)	R A Lister and Company	1941		This loco is still preserved, and in 2015 appeared at Amberley Museum when it was among a gathering of 12 Lister's coupled together to pull a train.
Penlee	2666	4wDM	2 ft (610 mm)	Hudson Hunslet	1942		Moved to Gloddfa Ganol in 1978, more recently at the Yaxham Light Railway
22	226302	4wDM	2 ft (610 mm)	Ruston & Hornsby	1944		Ex-Penrhyn Quarries. Bought by J Crosskey from Wychbold Railway, overhauled 1972/1973 by A.Keef. Arrived Brockham April 1975. Left Brockham for storage in late 1975/ early 1976
C18	4808	2w-2PM	3 ft (914 mm)	Wickham	1948		Purchased by Rich Morris from the Bord na Mona Attymon Works in County Galway. Type 8S, BSA engine. Moved to Brockham in December 1973. In 1978 moved to Gloddfa Ganol.
C20	4810	2w-2PM	3 ft (914 mm)	Wickham	1948		Purchased by Pete Nicholson from the Bord na Mona Ballyvor Works in County Westmeath. Type 8S, BSA engine. Moved to Brockham in December 1973. In 1978 moved to Gloddfa Ganol. Scrapped by the East Somerset Railway 2008.
C23	4813	2w-2PM	3 ft (914 mm)	Wickham	1948		Purchased by Pete Nicholson from the Bord na Mona Ballydermot Works in County Kildare. Chassis and body. Moved to Brockham in December 1973. In 1978 moved to Gloddfa Ganol.
(C26)	4816	2w-2PM	3 ft (914 mm)	Wickham	1948		Purchased by Rich Morris from the Bord na Mona Clonsast Works in County Offaly. Chassis only. Moved to Brockham in December 1973. In 1978 moved to Gloddfa Ganol.
4	3930044	4wDM	3 ft (914 mm)	John Fowler	1950	Sundon cement works near Luton	Arrived at Brockham Nov 1974. Effectively a Field Marshall Tractor made for rail. Moved to Gloddfa Ganol in 1978.
	20073	4wDM	2 ft (610 mm)	Motor Rail	1950		Purchased by J Crosskeys from Maenofferen. Moved to Brockham 1975. 2021 at Richmond Light Railway, Kent
	4396	4wDM	2 ft (610 mm)	Hudson Hunslet	1952	Hall Aggregates, Farnborough, Hants	Arrived Brockham June 1970 and immediately in use, owned by Pete Nicholson.
	6018	4wDM	2 ft (610 mm)	Hudson Hunslet	1961	Hogsmill Valley Sewage Treatment Works Kingston upon Thames	Arrived Brockham late 1975/early 1976, owned by Pete Nicholson. Moved to Gloddfa Ganol in 1978.
