= Gloddfa Ganol =

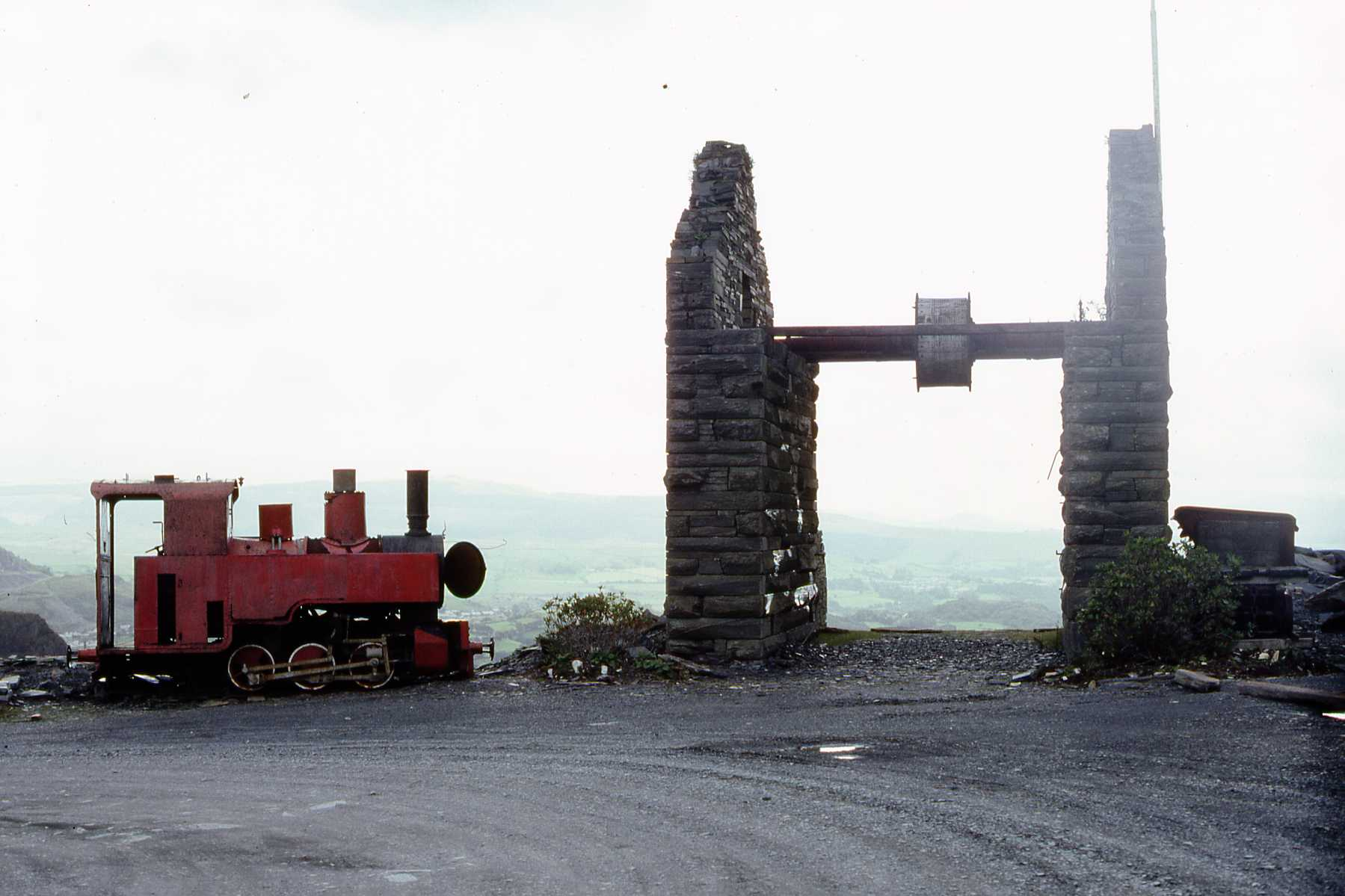
- The top of the Dinas incline from Gloddfa Ganol down to the Festiniog Railway

- Location within Gwynedd
- Established: 1974
- Dissolved: 1998
- Location: Blaenau Ffestiniog, Gwynedd, Wales
- Coordinates: 53.001823°N 3.950456°W
- Type: Railway museum

Gloddfa Ganol (also known as the Gloddfa Ganol Mountain Center) was a museum dedicated to the Welsh slate industry and narrow-gauge railways, situated in the Oakeley slate quarry in Blaenau Ffestiniog. It opened in 1974 and closed in 1998 following an auction of its exhibits.

== Gloddfa Ganol Mountain Center ==
The Oakeley slate quarry was the largest underground slate mine in the world, but it suffered from a sharp decline in worldwide demand for slate after the Second World War. As quarrying declined in the 1970s, the owners sought to diversify to serve the growing tourist trade in Wales. In 1974 the abandoned Middle Quarry was re-opened, producing architectural slab, and as an attraction to the public - the Gloddfa Ganol Mountain Center. The centre offered guided tours of several miles of underground tunnels and chambers and was based in the old Middle Mill, which had been rebuilt for the purpose.

== Rich Morris collection ==
Railway enthusiast Rich Morris began collecting narrow gauge rolling stock in 1963, when he purchased a metre gauge Ruston Proctor locomotive from a china clay mine in St Austell. He continued to purchase locomotives from across the United Kingdom, initially storing items at his house in Bampton in Oxfordshire. In 1974, he moved to Longfield in Kent, but the collection soon outgrew the storage capacity of his garden. In 1976, Morris arranged to move some of his locomotives to Pen-yr-Orsedd slate quarry in North Wales where he planned to set up a museum to exhibit his collection and tell the story of narrow gauge industrial railways.

Pen-yr-Orsedd was owned by The Festiniog Group, which owned several slate quarries across North Wales. In 1977, the company consolidated their activities in their quarries in Blaenau Ffestiniog and closed down Pen-yr-Orsedd. They offered space to the Morris collection at their largest quarry, Oakeley.

== The Narrow Gauge Railway Centre ==
A new company, Narrow Gauge Enterprises, was set up to oversee the new museum at Gloddfa Ganol. Morris moved most of his collection to the Gloddfa Ganol Mountain Centre starting in May 1978, with the majority being moved on five articulated lorries on 23 June. Some exhibits initially went into storage in an annexe in Blaenau Ffestiniog. As well as Morris' collection, locomotives belonging to Pete Nicholson were moved from the Brockham Railway Museum near Dorking on 18 July. By September of that year, all the equipment had been moved from Pen-yr-Orsedd, and more than 70 locomotives were on site.

The collection was initially housed in a new Exhibition Hall, with some locomotives scattered outside. This hall was adapted from the disused winding house of the Dafydd Glanamarch incline.

Around 1985 Holland's Lower Mill, which had been demolished many years previously, was rebuilt and the railway collection was moved there. This mill was on the west end of the Gloddfa Ganol site, and in 1987, a short railway was laid to connect the main car park to the mill. It opened for the 1988 season, with three Motor Rail locomotives running passenger trains along this line.

=== Locomotives ===
Name/ Number	Gauge	Builder	Type	Date	Works number	Disposition	Notes
50823	1,000 mm (3 ft 3 3/8 in)	Ruston, Proctor and Company	4wPM	1915	50823	Vale of Rheidol Museum Collection.	The first locomotive in Rich Morris' collection, purchased in 1963.
Llanfair	3 ft (914 mm)	De Winton	0-4-0VB	1895		Welsh Highland Railway, on display at Dinas	Owned by Peter Nicholson. Built for the Penmaenmawr & Welsh Granite Co.
C37	3 ft (914 mm)	Locospoor	2w-2PM		B7281E		4-wheel trolley purchased by Rich Morris from the Bord na Mona Coolnagan Works in County Westmeath. Moved to the Morris' home in December 1974.
LM11	3 ft (914 mm)	Rhurthaler	0-4-0DM	c1936	1082		Ran at the Lullymore Briquetting Factory in Ireland. Purchased by Michael Jacob in 1973 and moved to the Brockham Railway Museum in December. Later purchased by Rich Morris and moved to Gloddfa Ganol. The only example of its type on the British Isles.
C13	3 ft (914 mm)	Wickham	2w-2PM	1938	2449		From the Bord na Mona Lullymore Works in County Kildare. Moved to Brockham Railway Museum in December 1973.
6/501	3 ft (914 mm)	Wickham	2w-2PM	1946	4091	Owned by the UK County Domnegal Group, in Birmingham.	
W6/504	3 ft (914 mm)	Wickham	2w-2PM	1946	4092		Rebuilt by Jason Allen of Grimoldby in 2005.
C18	3 ft (914 mm)	Wickham	2w-2PM	1948	4808		Purchased by Rich Morris from the Bord na Mona Attymon Works in County Galway. Moved to the Brockham Railway Museum in December 1974.
C20	3 ft (914 mm)	Wickham	2w-2PM	1948	4810		Purchased by Pete Nicholson from the Bord na Mona Ballyvor Works in County Westmeath. Moved to the Brockham Railway Museum in December 1974.
C23	3 ft (914 mm)	Wickham	2w-2PM	1948	4813		Purchased by Pete Nicholson from the Bord na Mona Ballydermot Works in County Kildare. Moved to the Brockham Railway Museum in December 1974.
(C26)	3 ft (914 mm)	Wickham	2w-2PM	1948	4816		Purchased by Rich Morris from the Bord na Mona Clonsast Works in County Offaly. Moved to the Brockham Railway Museum in December 1974.
4	3 ft (914 mm)	John Fowler	4wDM	1950	3930044		Worked at the Sundon cement works near Luton.
W6/32	3 ft (914 mm)	Motor Rail	4wDM	1969	105H006	Owned by Pete Nicholson. On long-term loan to the Southwold Railway	
The Wee Pug later named: Darent	2 ft 6 in (762 mm)	Andrew Barclay Sons & Co.	0-4-0T	1903	984	Eynsford Light Railway. Purchased in 2013 by the Hampton Kempton Waterworks Railway.	Built for the Provan Gas Works in Glasgow. Sold for scrap in 1961, but purchased by Rich Morris in May 1963. Converted to 2 ft (610 mm) and fitted with a cab and saddle tank at Eynsford.
Yard No. 988	2 ft 6 in (762 mm)	Ruston & Hornsby	4wDM	1944	235729	Chasewater Narrow Gauge Railway.	
45913	2 ft 6 in (762 mm)	Robert Hudson	4wPM	1932	45913	Amberley Museum Railway.	Rare Hudson GoGo Tractor. Worked at Midhurst Whites in Midhurst.
Dolwyddelan	750 mm (2 ft 5 1/2 in)	Hunslet	4wDM	1941	2209	In private ownership	Supplied to Workington Colliery. Displayed on the platform at Dolwyddelan railway station while part of the Gloddfa Ganol collection.
Corris	2 ft 4 in (711 mm)	Ruston Hornsby	4wDM	1956	398102	Blatchford Light Railway	
Dorothy	2 ft (610 mm)	Bagnall	0-4-0ST	1899	1568	In private ownership, lately at Bala Lake Railway	ex-Llechwedd quarry, where it was dismantled to convert into an overhead-wire electric locomotive, though conversion did not take place. Parts purchased by Rich Morris in 1973.
AshoverDerw Bach	2 ft (610 mm)	Kerr Stuart	0-4-0ST	1918	3114	Sold to Allen Civil in 1978. Ran on the Amerton Railway in 2002. In the Vale of Rheidol Museum Collection.	Built for the RAF for the aerodrome at Eastburn near Driffield. Worked on five reservoir construction projects across the UK. In 1942 it was purchased for use at the Woodthorpe Hall colliery, connected to the Ashover Light Railway. Purchased for private use by J. L. Baker of Erdington at his farm at Brockamin. Sold to Alan Maund who restored it to working order. Sold on to Rich Morris in 1971. Moved to Gloddfa Ganol in March 1978. Loaned to the Bala Lake Railway from 1982 to 1985.
Steam Tram	2 ft (610 mm)	Lister	4wVB	1940	14005	Retained by Rich Morris after closure. Moved to the Tanat Valley Light Railway.	Lister petrol locomotive converted to steam by Roy Etherington in 1969.
	2 ft (610 mm)	Lister	4wPM		39005	Retained by Rich Morris after closure. Moved to the Tanat Valley Light Railway.	
	2 ft (610 mm)	Rhiwbach quarry	2w-2PM			Moseley Railway Trust	Built at the quarry from parts of an Austin 7 car.
	2 ft (610 mm)	Brush	4wBE	c1917	16306	Parts used to rebuild Brush 16307 and 16303 at the Amberley Museum Railway.	Built for HMEF Queensferry, Deeside.
No. 760	2 ft (610 mm)	Baguley	0-4-0PM	1918	760	Sold to the Abbey Light Railway in 1998, moved to the Welsh Highland Heritage Railway.	10hp McEwan Pratt design built for the Timber Supply Department. Purchased by Rich Morris in 1965.
Oakeley	2 ft (610 mm)	Baguley	0-4-0PM	1919	774		Built for the Pennal timber tramway. Purchased secondhand by Oakeley Quarry in 1927. Purchased by Rich Morris in 1970.
39924	2 ft (610 mm)	Robert Hudson	4wPM	1924	39924	Abbey Light Railway. Moved to the Welsh Highland Heritage Railway.	
A110	2 ft (610 mm)	Muir-Hill	4wPM	1925	A110	Abbey Light Railway. Moved to the Welsh Highland Heritage Railway.	
Welsh Pony	2 ft (610 mm)	Wingrove & Rogers	4wWE	1926	640	West Lancashire Light Railway	ex-Llechwedd quarry
Spondon	2 ft (610 mm)	Derbyshire and Nottinghamshire Electric Power Company	4wBE	1926		Sold to a private owner in Derbyshire. Restored to working order.	Built for use at the Spondon power station.
1568	2 ft (610 mm)	Hibberd	4wPM	1927	1568	Leighton Buzzard Light Railway.	
36863	2 ft (610 mm)	Robert Hudson	4wDM	1929	36863	Leeds Industrial Museum at Armley Mills.	
D564	2 ft (610 mm)	Hudswell Clarke	4wDM	1930	D564	Vale of Rheidol Museum Collection	Supplied to Beswick’s Limeworks, near Buxton.
982	2 ft (610 mm)	Howards	4wPM	1930	982	Restored to working order at the Apedale Valley Railway.	The only remaining locomotive built by Howards. Supplied new to the Whittlesea Central brickworks. Preserved in 1970 at the Cadeby Light Railway. Move to Brockham Railway Museum in 1973. Sold in 2007 to a member of the Moseley Railway Trust.
1747	2 ft (610 mm)	Hibberd	4wPM	1931	1747		Purchased by Pete Nicholson and moved to Brockham Railway Museum in February 1974.
3916	2 ft (610 mm)	Lister	4wDM	c1931	3916	Twyford Waterworks Railway.	
Delta	2 ft (610 mm)	Deutz	0-4-0DM	1932	257081		Purchased by Rich Morris from the Long Reach works of the West Kent Main Sewerage Board. Moved to his house in Longfield in January 1974.
164346	2 ft (610 mm)	Ruston & Hornsby	4wDM	1932	164346	Leighton Buzzard Narrow Gauge Railway	Worked at the West Kent Main Sewage Board, Littlebrook, Kent. Purchased by Rich Morris. The second oldest Ruston Hornsby locomotive in existence.
166028	2 ft (610 mm)	Ruston & Hornsby	4wDM	1932	166028		Dismantled in 1982.
164350	2 ft (610 mm)	Ruston & Hornsby	4wDM	1933	164350		Purchased by Michael Jacobs from Enfield Sewage Works in 1966. Moved to Brockham Railway Museum in February 1974.
1881	2 ft (610 mm)	Hibberd	4wPM	1934	1881	Steeple Grange Light Railway	Originally 18 in (457 mm). Supplied to the Crowle Brickworks near Scunthorpe. Purchased by Rich Morris in October 1970, regauge to 2 ft (610 mm) in 1972.
6299	2 ft (610 mm)	Lister	4wPM	1935	6299	Devon Railway Centre.	
Little George	2 ft (610 mm)	Wingrove & Rogers	0-4-0BE	c1935	1298	Moseley Narrow Gauge Industrial Tramway, Tumbly Down Farm, Redruth.	
2025	2 ft (610 mm)	Hibberd	4wDM	1937	2025	Under restoration at the Amerton Railway.	
2201	2 ft (610 mm)	Hibberd	4wDM	1939	2201	Devon Railway Centre	Worked at the Berrylands Sewage Works.
2207	2 ft (610 mm)	Hunslet	4wDM	1941	2207		Built for the Trefor granite quarry. Acquired by Morris in 1965; moved to Gloddfa Ganol in 1977; displayed at Duffws station in 1979.
Penlee	2 ft (610 mm)	Hunslet	4wDM	1942	2666	Yaxham Light Railway.	
213834	2 ft (610 mm)	Ruston & Hornsby	4wDM	1942	213834		Owned by the Gwynedd River Authority, and stored at their depot at Dinas railway station from 1963 until at least 1970.
Pen-yr-orsedd	2 ft (610 mm)	Ruston & Hornsby	4wDM	1945	235711	Devon Railway Centre	Hired for use in the reconstruction of the Britannia Bridge after preservation.
Thakeham No. 4	2 ft (610 mm)	Thakeham Tiles Company	4wPM	c.1945		Moved to the Cadeby Light Railway, then into private ownership at the Amberley Museum Railway.	
3424	2 ft (610 mm)	Hibberd	4wPM	1949	3424	Steeple Grange Light Railway and regauged to 18 in (457 mm)	Originally 18 in (457 mm) gauge and used at the Saltlands Tileries, near Bridgwater. Purchased by Rich Morris in 1969, and converted to 2 ft (610 mm) gauge in 1971.
Bredbury	2 ft (610 mm)	Bredbury water works	4wPM	c1954		West Lancashire Light Railway	
ZM32 Horwich	2 ft (610 mm)	Ruston & Hornsby	4wDM	1957	416214	Steeple Grange Light Railway	Supplied to British Railways, Horwich Works in Lancashire. Initially preserved at the National Railway Museum, before moving to Gloddfa Ganol.
432664	2 ft (610 mm)	Ruston & Hornsby	4wDM	1959	432664		Purchased from the Rosemary Tileries, Staffordshire.
Twusk	2 ft (610 mm)	Hunslet	4wDM	1961	6018		Built for the North Surrey Joint Sewage Board work at New Malden.
Trent Water Authority later Sylvia	2 ft (610 mm)	Motor Rail	4wDM	1962	22128	Sold to William Sinclair Horticultural, Springfield Moss works	Arrived at Gloddfa Ganol between 1979 and 1982.
Rail Taxi	2 ft (610 mm)	Rich Morris	4-2-0PM	1967		Retained by Rich Morris after closure. Moved to the Tanat Valley Light Railway.	An Isetta "bubble car" converted for rail use by Rich Morris. Initially used on the Leighton Buzzard Light Railway.
2442	600 mm (1 ft 11 5/8 in)	Kerr Stuart	0-6-0T	1915	2442	Purchased by the Teifi Valley Railway. Now at the private Richmond Light Rawilay in Kent.	Joffre class. Worked at the quarry of Carriers de la Vallee Heureuse, in France from October 1930.
2451	600 mm (1 ft 11 5/8 in)	Kerr Stuart	0-6-0T	1915	2451	Lynton and Barnstaple Railway, restored to working order and named Axe.	Joffre class. Worked at the quarry of Carriers de la Vallee Heureuse, in France.
3010	600 mm (1 ft 11 5/8 in)	Kerr Stuart	0-6-0T	1916	3010	Statfold Barn Railway in 2012.	Joffre class. Worked at the quarry of Carriers de la Vallee Heureuse, in France in June 1930. Moved to the Yaxham Light Railway after the closure of Gloddfa Ganol,
3014	600 mm (1 ft 11 5/8 in)	Kerr Stuart	0-6-0T	1916	3014	Moseley Railway Trust and restored to working order.	Joffre class. Worked at the quarry of Carriers de la Vallee Heureuse, in France in October 1930.
LR2182	600 mm (1 ft 11 5/8 in)	Motor Rail	4wPM	1917	461	The Greensand Railway Museum Trust at the Leighton Buzzard Light Railway	40hp armoured Simplex built for use in the First World War.
No. 646	600 mm (1 ft 11 5/8 in)	Baguley	0-4-0PM	1918	646	Moseley Railway Trust	10hp McEwan Pratt design built for the Timber Supply Department.
No. 736	600 mm (1 ft 11 5/8 in)	Baguley	0-4-0PM	1918	736	Abbey Light Railway, then the Welsh Highland Heritage Railway	10hp McEwan Pratt design built for the Timber Supply Department.
Python	600 mm (1 ft 11 5/8 in)	Orenstein & Koppel	4wPM	1930	4470		Purchased by P.D. Nicholson and stored at the Brockham Railway Museum before Gloddfa Ganol.
1835	600 mm (1 ft 11 5/8 in)	Hunslet	4wDM	1937	1835		Built for the ordnance depot at Barlow, North Yorkshire.
MP18	600 mm (1 ft 11 5/8 in)	Hunslet	4wDM	1940	2024	Bala Lake Railway	Supplied to the Trefor granite quarry. Sold in 1962 to the Cwt-y-Bugail quarry.
211647	600 mm (1 ft 11 5/8 in)	Ruston & Hornsby	4wDM	1941	211647		
2607	600 mm (1 ft 11 5/8 in)	Hunslet	4wDM	1942	2607	Tanfield Railway.	
Monster	1 ft 11 1/2 in (597 mm)	North Staffordshire Group of the Festiniog Railway	4wDM	1974		Sold back to the Festiniog Railway in 1998. Restored to working order.	Built from a skip frame, parts of a Lister Road Truck and an Enfield boat engine. Sold to Rich Morris in 1976.
Kathleen	1 ft 10 3/4 in (578 mm)	De Winton	0-4-0VB	1877		Vale of Rheidol Museum Collection	
551	18 in (457 mm)	Wingrove & Rogers	4wBE	1924	551		Worked at Gurnos Tin Plate, Clydach, Swansea, then moved to the nearby John Player & Sons factory.
Whippet Quick	15 in (381 mm)	Lister	0-4-4PM	1935	6502	Windmill Farm Railway	Rebuilt at the Fairbourne Railway from a Lister 4wPM Railtruck

=== Gallery ===
Ex-Gloddfa Ganol locomotives:

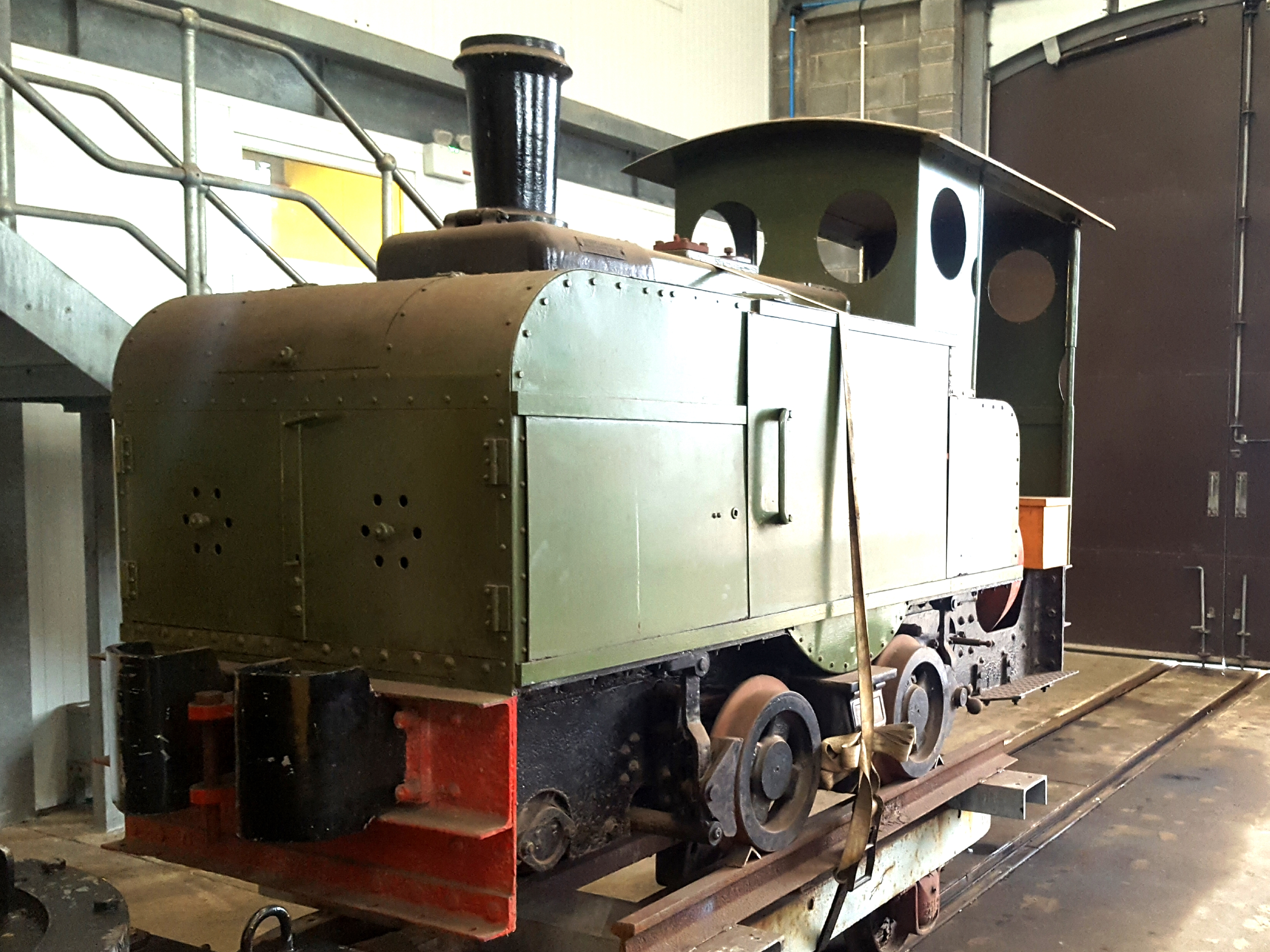
The first locomotive purchased by Rich Morris. Ruston Proctor 50823 of 1915

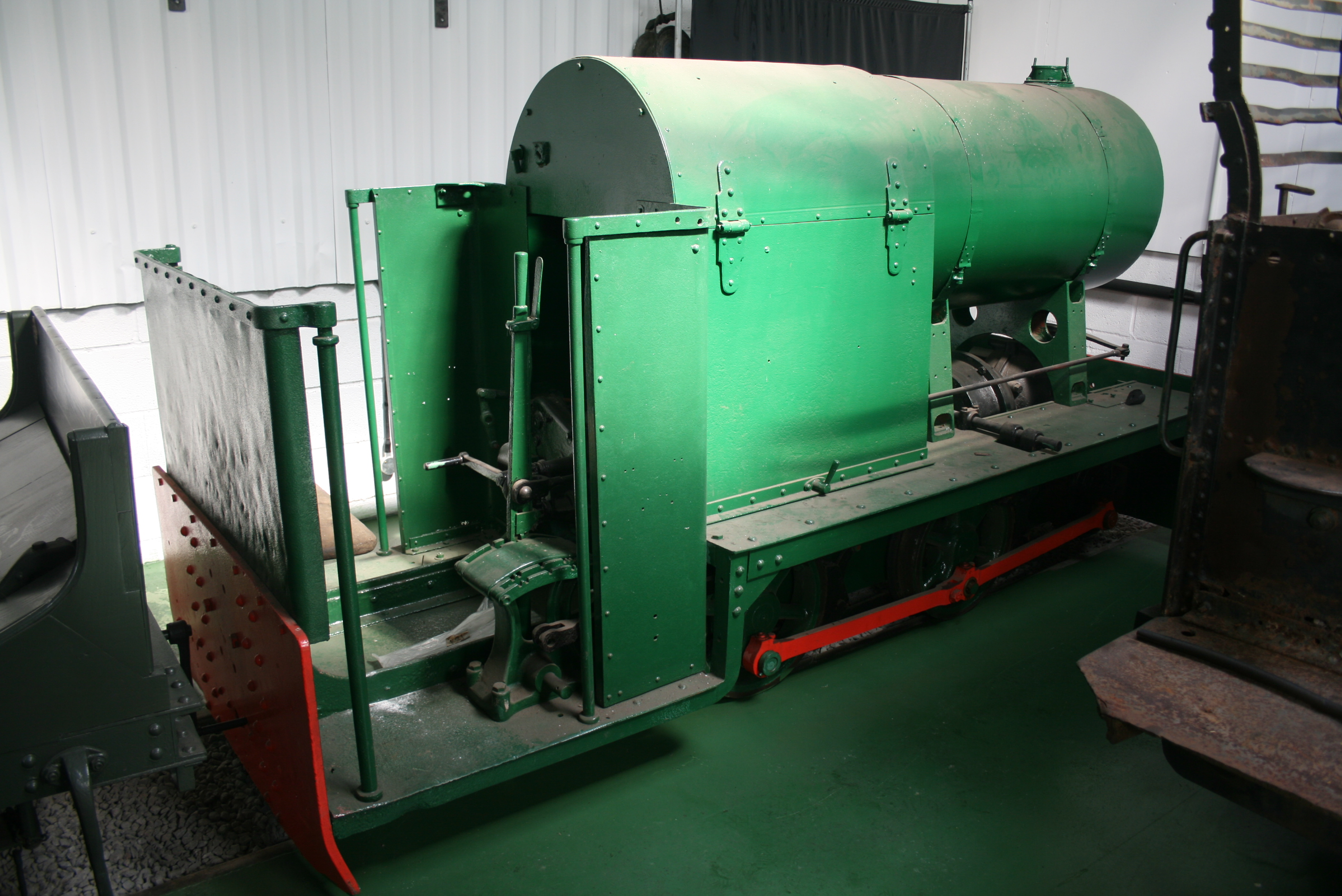
Baguley 774 at the Statfold Barn Railway

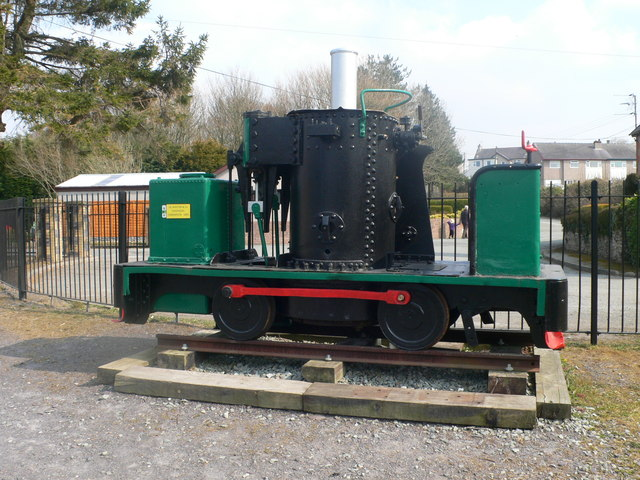
De Winton Llanfair at Dinas station

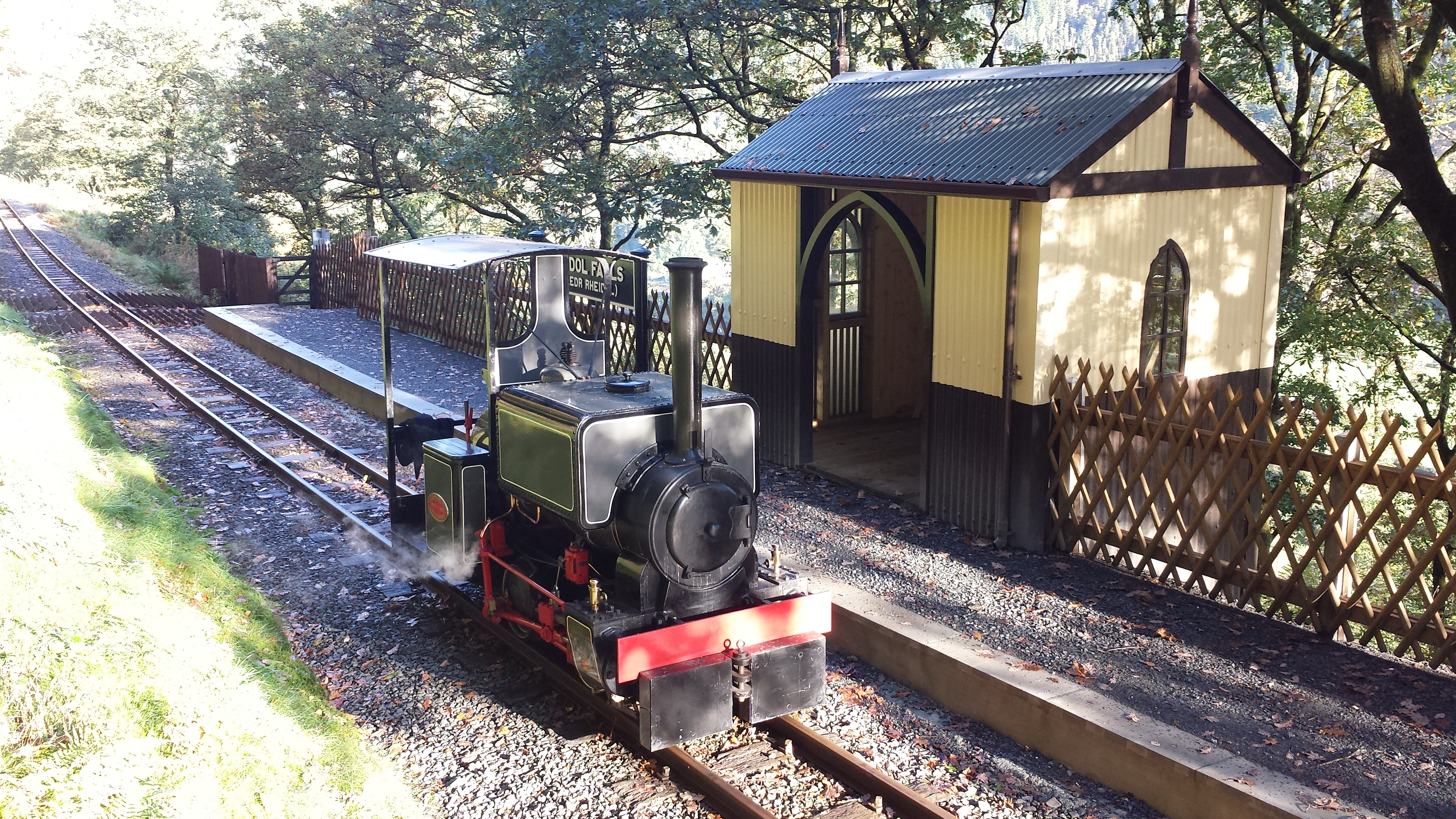
Kerr Stuart 3114 at the Vale of Rheidol Railway

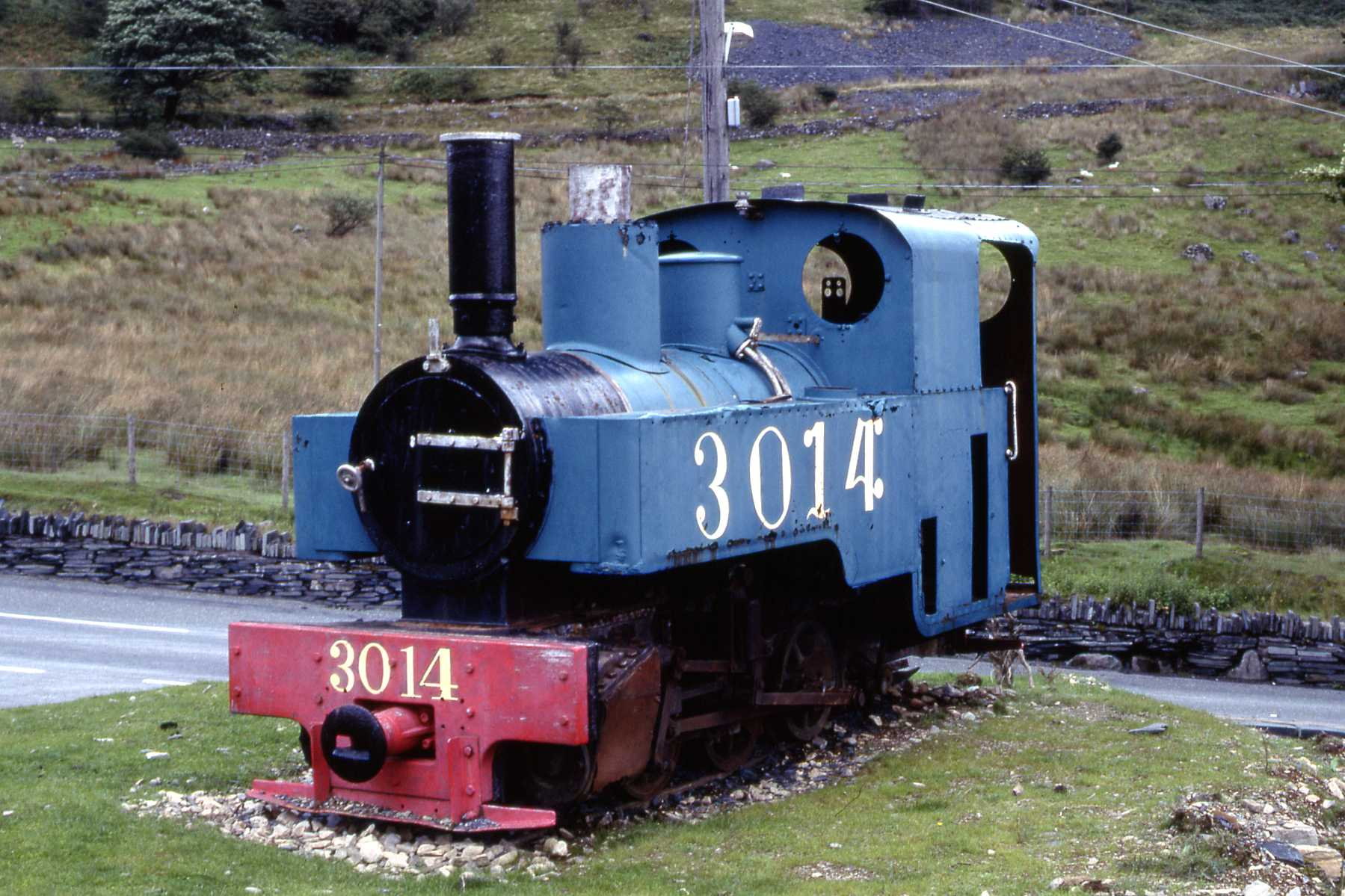
Kerr Stuart 0-6-0T locomotive at the entrance to Gloddfa Ganol

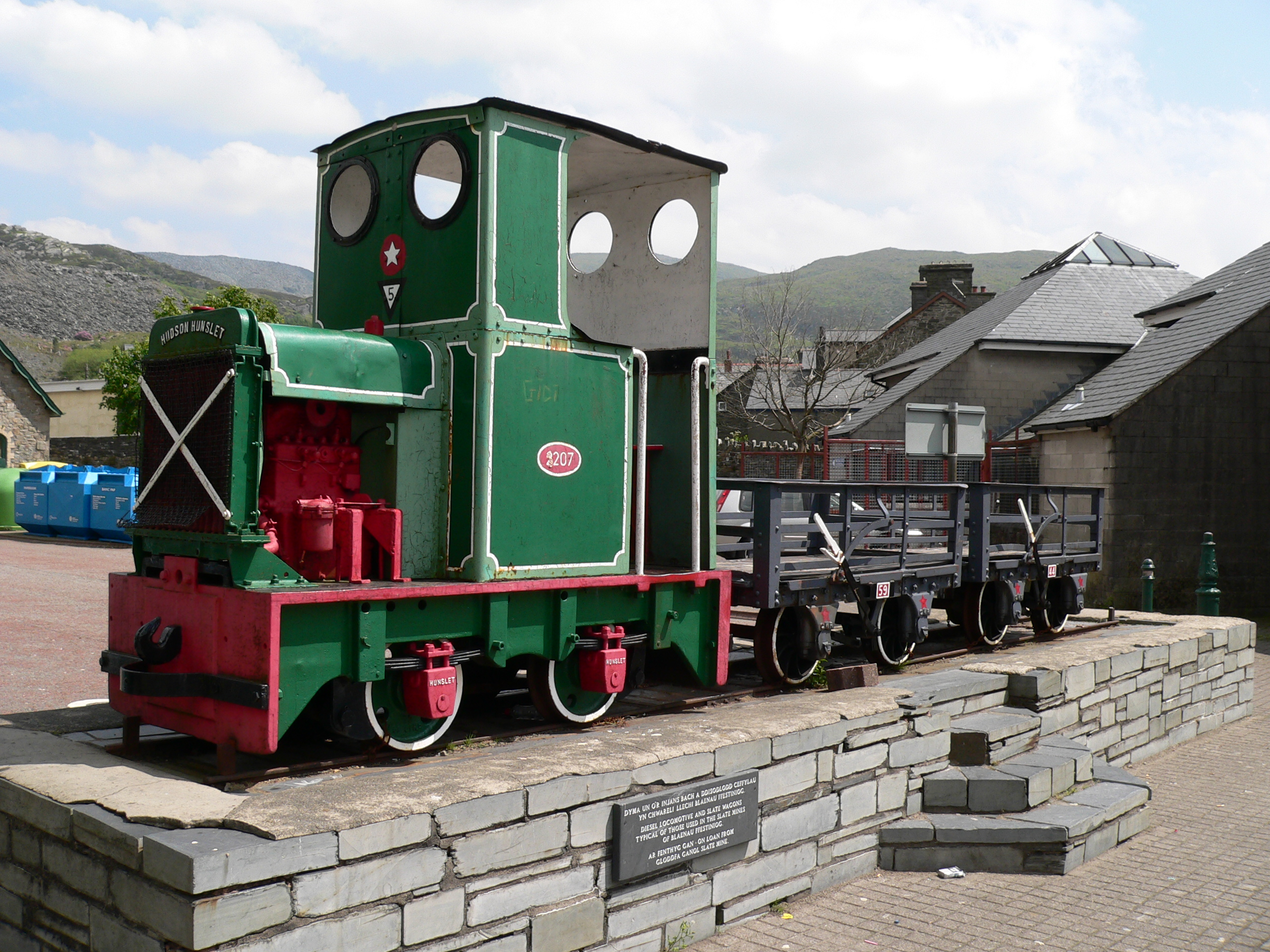
Hunslet 2207 on display at Duffws station

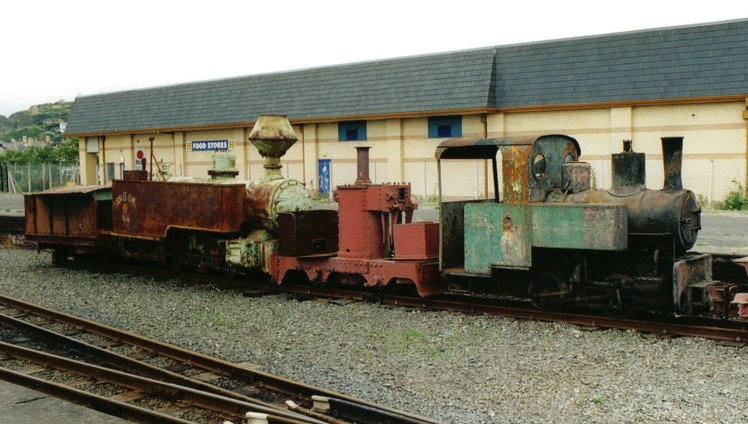
Kathleen at Aberystwyth station

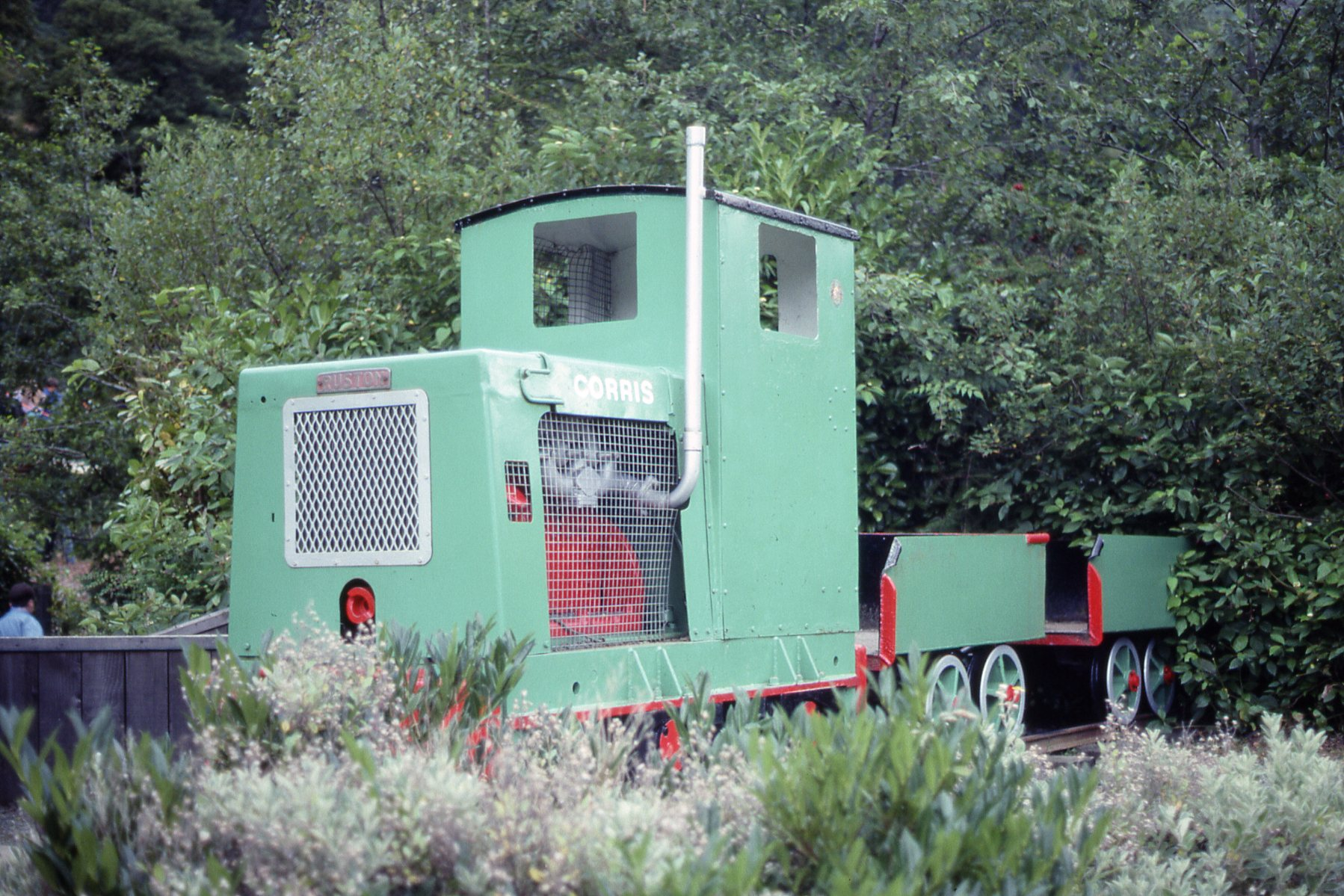
Ruston & Hornsby 398102 on display at the Corris Craft Centre

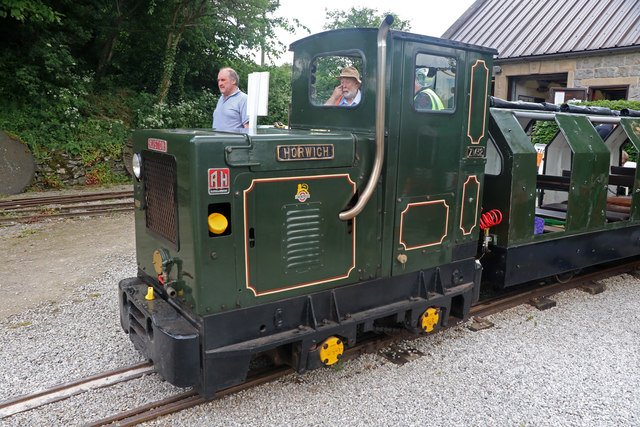
ZM32 Horwich at Steeple Grange Light Railway

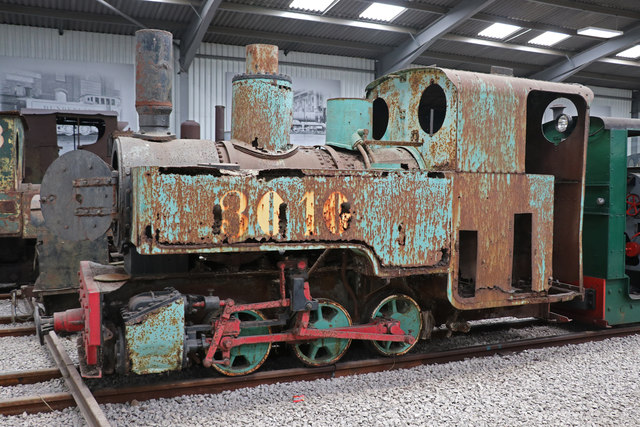
Joffre 3010 at the Statfold Barn Railway

== Closure ==
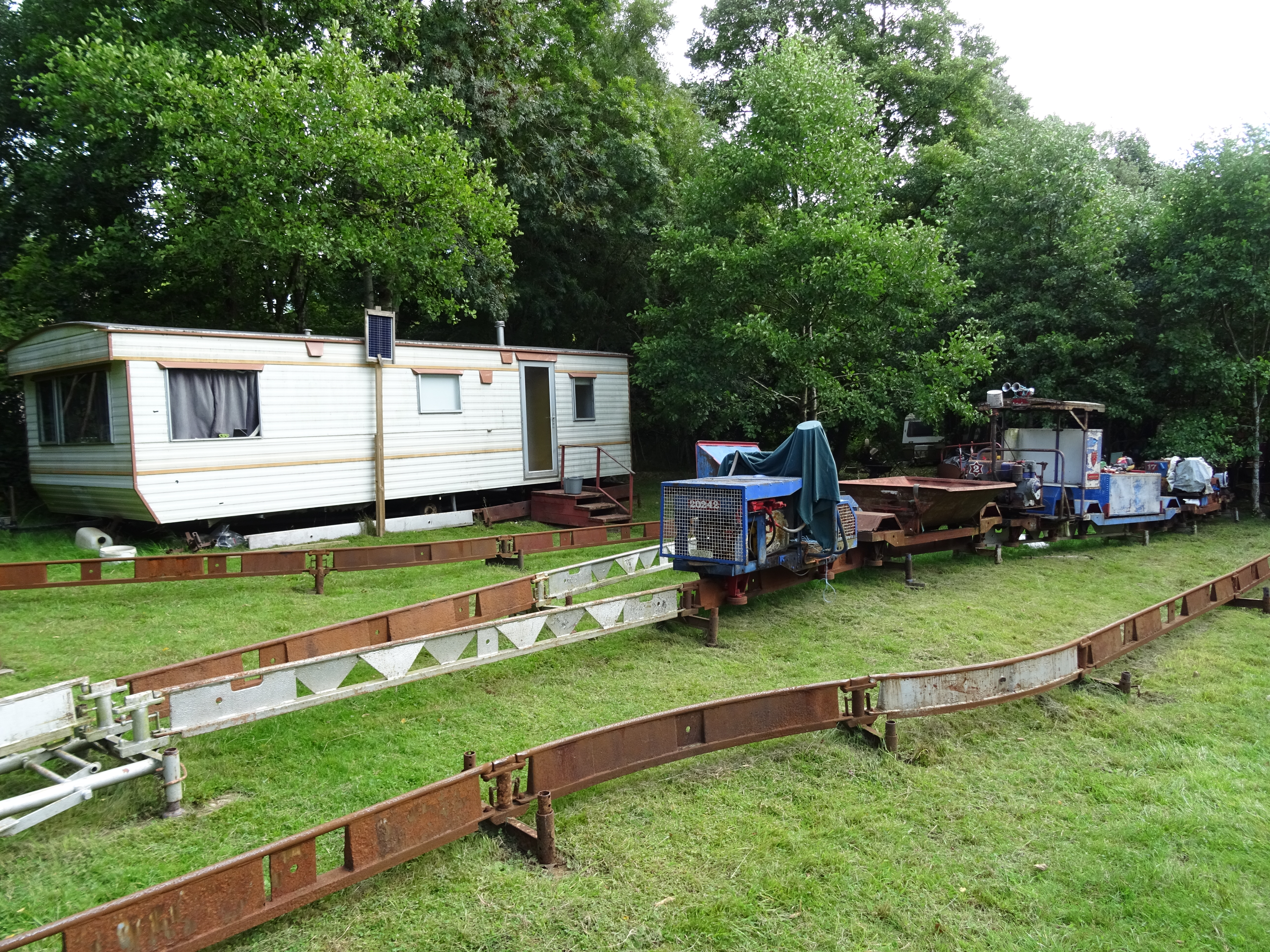
Some of Rich Morris' industrial monorail collection

On 8 October 1997 it was announced that Alfred McAlpine Slate had taken over the Ffestiniog Slate group, including the Oakeley quarry. McAlpines immediately announced that Gloddfa Ganol would close at the end of the year. The majority of the locomotive collection was auctioned in February 1998. By June 1998, only three locomotives remained on the site.

Rich Morris retained his collection of portable industrial monorail equipment, designed by Road Machines (Drayton) Ltd and used for construction projects in the mid 20th century, along with the remains of the Gloddfa Ganol collection: Listers 39005 and 14005, one standard gauge Wickham trolley and Rail Taxi.

Morris died in 2018, and his collection was transferred to the Tanat Valley Light Railway.

== See also ==
- Llechwedd Slate Caverns
- Ffestiniog Railway
