= Trefor Quarry railway =

UK railway company

Coordinates: 52.984°N 4.412°W

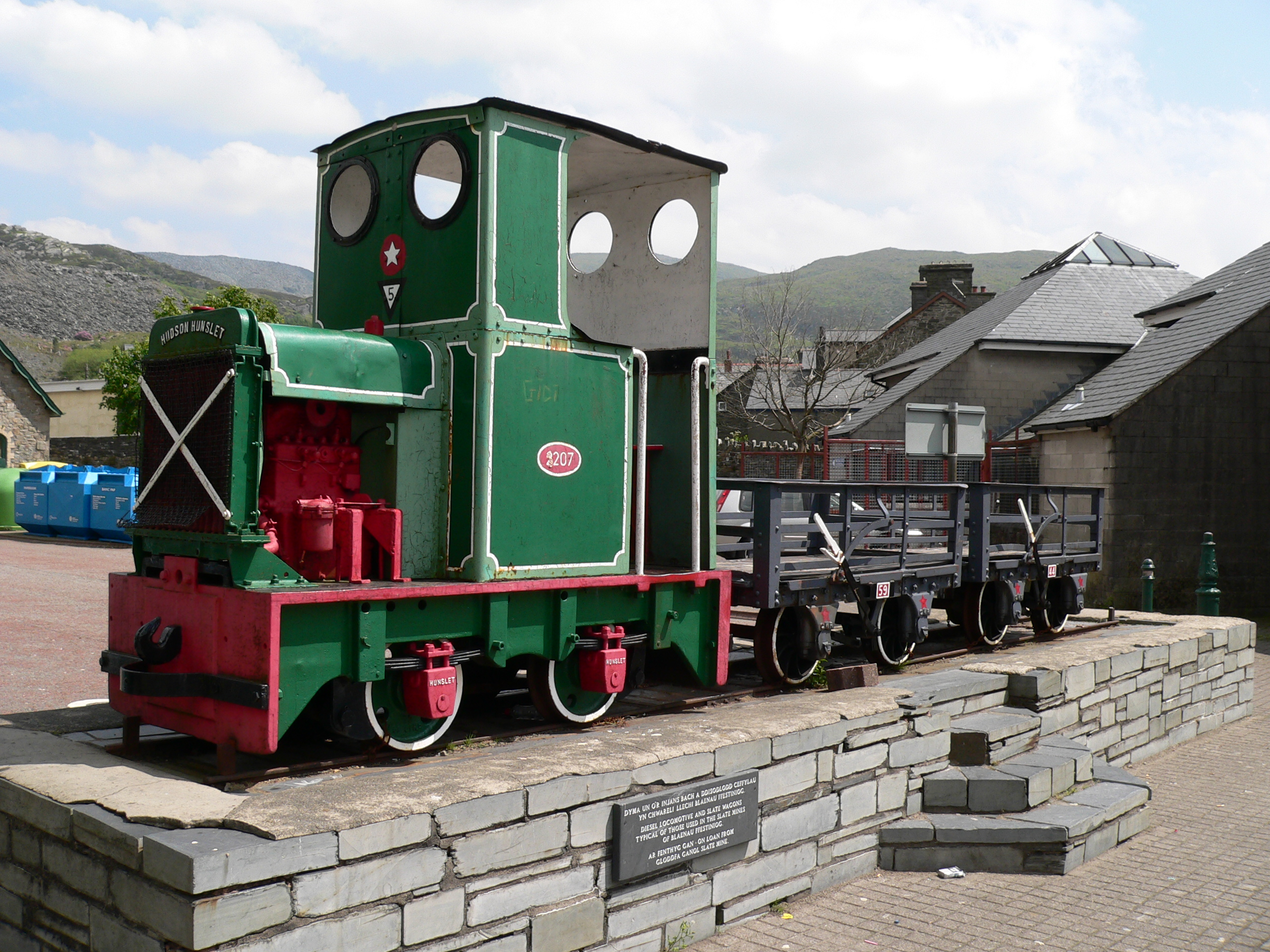
- Locomotive 2207 and slate wagons, now on display at Blaenau Ffestiniog

Overview
- Headquarters: Llanaelhaearn
- Locale: Wales
- Dates of operation: 1864–1962
- Successor: Abandoned

Technical
- Track gauge: 1 ft 11 1/2 in (597 mm)
- Length: 1 mile

The Trefor Quarry railway was an industrial, 1 ft 11 1/2 in (597 mm) narrow-gauge railway connecting the Trefor granite quarry with the pier at Llanaelhaearn on the Llŷn Peninsula.

== History ==
The Trefor granite quarry (also known as the Yr Eifl quarry) opened in 1850. In 1855 the quarry applied to build a jetty on the coast to ship granite products. The pier was not built, but the application was renewed in 1867, the pier being built by 1870 and a railway was constructed connecting the quarry with the pier. There had been horse-worked internal quarry tramways as early as 1865.

In 1873 steam locomotives were introduced to work in the quarry and along the ½ mile long section from the foot of the quarry incline to the pier. One incline was particularly steep with one section at a gradient of 1 in 1¾, said to be the steepest incline in any granite quarry in Britain.

A short branch line served the village of Trefor at the foot of the incline. This branch was lifted before 1920. From 1951 onwards the railway was gradually replaced by road transport. The main incline was abandoned in 1959 and the railway finally closed in 1962.

== Locomotives ==
Number	Name	Builder	Type	Date	Works number	Notes
		De Winton	0-4-0VB	1873		Scrapped by 1914
		De Winton	0-4-0VB	1875		Scrapped by 1914
	Isabel	W.G. Bagnall	0-4-0ST	1900	1614	Scrapped 1930
	Betty	Hunslet	0-4-0ST	1912	1101	To Brymbo Steel Co., Hook Norton in 1942; scrapped in 1949
	Redstone	Darbishire's	0-4-0VB	1905		Only briefly ran at Trefor in 1921
	Michael	Kerr Stuart	0-4-2ST	1917	2494	Withdrawn in 1932; subsequently scrapped
	Mark	Kerr Stuart	4-6-0T	1920	4213	ex-War Department Light Railways; scrapped by 1938
		Motor Rail	4wPM	1918	1378	ex-War Department Light Railways; sold
		Motor Rail	4wPM	1925	3736	Rebuilt ex-War Department Light Railways locomotive; scrapped
		Motor Rail	4wDM	1930	5513	To Penmaenmawr & Welsh Granite Co.
1		Motor Rail	4wDM	1931	5609	sold. Now at the Chasewater Railway
2		Motor Rail	4wDM	1918	1078	Rebuilt ex-War Department Light Railways locomotive; scrapped by 1954
2		Motor Rail	4wDM	1937	5949	Sold or scrapped
3		Motor Rail	4wPM			Sold or scrapped by 1954
3		Motor Rail	4wDM	1938	7221	Sold
4 (ex-6)		Motor Rail	4wDM	1929	5025	Sold
5		Motor Rail	4wPM			Sold or scrapped
5		Hunslet	4wDM	1941	2207	Sold in 1965 to Rich Morris. Moved to Gloddfa Ganol in 1977. Put on display at Duffws station in 1979.
6		Hunslet	4wDM	1941	2208	Withdrawn by 1962
7		Ruston & Hornsby	4wDM	1938	189953	Sold
8		Motor Rail	4wDM	1940	8570	Sold or scrapped 1954
9		Hunslet	4wDM	1940	2024	ex-Forestry Commission. Sold in 1962 to the Cwt-y-Bugail quarry. Now preserved at the Bala Lake Railway.
10		Hunslet	4wDM	1940	2025	ex-Forestry Commission; withdrawn by 1961
11		Hunslet	4wDM	1940		Sold
12		Ruston & Hornsby	4wDM	1940	200480	Scrapped c. 1960

== See also ==
- British industrial narrow gauge railways
