= SGLR =

SGRL stands for

- Seminole Gulf Railway
- Scannerless Generalized LR Parser describes a Generalized LR parser without a separate Scanner aka. lexical analysis
- Steeple Grange Light Railway
