= Creekmoor Light Railway =

Coordinates: 50.7465°N 2.0000°W

Overview
- Headquarters: Fleetsbridge
- Locale: England
- Dates of operation: 1968–1973
- Successor: Abandoned

Technical
- Track gauge: 2 ft (610 mm)
- Length: 1/2 mile (0.8 km)

The Creekmoor Light Railway was a small, privately run, 2 ft (610 mm) narrow gauge railway. It was situated off Creekmoor Lane, to the north of Poole, between Broadstone and Fleetsbridge, Dorset, and was operated by a group of local enthusiasts from October 1968, to April 1973.

== Origins ==
With the closure and demolition of the Upton (formerly Lytchett Brick Co. Ltd) Brickworks to make way for a residential development their narrow gauge network, which had been in use since 1901, was scrapped allowing rails and sleepers, two 4-wheel drive locomotives (one workable), 8 vee skips, 12 tall brick carrying trollies/wagons and accessories to be acquired for the Creekmoor project, with other railway equipment from the brickworks being purchased by the Launceston Steam Railway.

In late October 1968 construction commenced with the line running for just over half a mile from land adjacent to the former Creekmoor Halt Station across smallholdings held by Trevor Waterman - the project's initiator - and his brother. They planned to utilise the railway to carry feed for their pigs.

The construction of the railway was a makeshift affair with sheds being constructed from scrap material and rolling stock adapted from available stock.

A 16-foot-long (4.9 m) flat bogie rail carrier, a 14 ft (4.3 m) bogie coach to carry 12 passengers, and a tool van were all built using the chassis and framework. This was flame cut from the brick carrying trollies, cutting down the pillars. Typically, a chassis had to be cut in half, a section of angle iron then welded on each end resulting in two bogies, each needing two axle boxes / wheels.

During 1970 ten shillings were offered, and accepted by the British Rail Property division, for the Creekmoor Light Railway to remove all the redundant signal lattice posts, arms, signs and dummy signals from the line approaching Broadstone.

== Locomotives ==
The 0-6-0WT steam locomotive (works number 9239 of 1939), Fojo, built by Orenstein & Koppel was purchased with proceeds from the sale of scrap metal from the signaling acquisition. It was moved to Hertfordshire and subsequently sold to Welsh Highland Railway, Beddgelert in 1978.

The diesel locos bought from Upton Brickworks were -

- No.1. Hibberd 1887 of 1934 named Samson came from the Upton Brickworks in Oct 1968.
- No.2. Motor Rail 9778 of 1953, Delilah came from the Upton Brickworks in Oct 1968.
- No.3. Ruston Hornsby 179880 of 1936 Brunel came from L.W. Vass Ltd, Dealer, Ampthill, Bedfordshire, December 1969 and went to Lynton and Barnstaple Railway c1978.
- No.4. Motor Rail 8644 of 1941, a runner named Druid came from Pollock & Brown, Southampton. May 1971 and went to Hemingbrough tile works, near Selby, where it was pictured working in 1979. It then went to the Abbey Light Railway, Leeds, it was totally rebuilt in a different guise in 1999 and continues working to this day.

== Operation ==
The line was operated for five years, usually late afternoon until after dusk. Fridays, Saturdays and access often extended on Sundays with occasional visits from members of the local Railway Club.

Turning the coach into the engine shed road was a curiosity. The main track ran down over a ditch to a short stub of only eight feet, the passenger coach being fourteen, firstly had its 4-foot-long (1.2 m) bogie run onto the stub, Right hand point crossed over, coach pushed over, the new set route, which, with the coach length swinging in an arc, would position it on the turntable. Then 2nd bogie over the point, reset, and pushed up on the outer line alongside the locos in the shed.

== Decline and closure ==
In 1973 a new housing estate was planned covering the whole of the smallholdings area which forced the railway to move down to Crockway Farm, Maiden Newton, Dorset.

A three-road shed with a pit was built, locomotives put inside and wagons pushed a few hundred yards over temporary welded track to a couple of sidings. But with the distance down to Crockway, 30 miles (48 km), interest in restarting slowly waned. By 1978 all stock and signs were sold off in auctions arranged with the Narrow Gauge Railway Society.

Some of the enthusiasts who had worked on the project went on to work for Network Rail, while others became the nucleus of the newly formed Swanage Railway Society.
