= Abbey Light Railway =

Former narrow gauge railway in West Yorkshire, England

Coordinates: 53°48′59″N 1°36′16″W

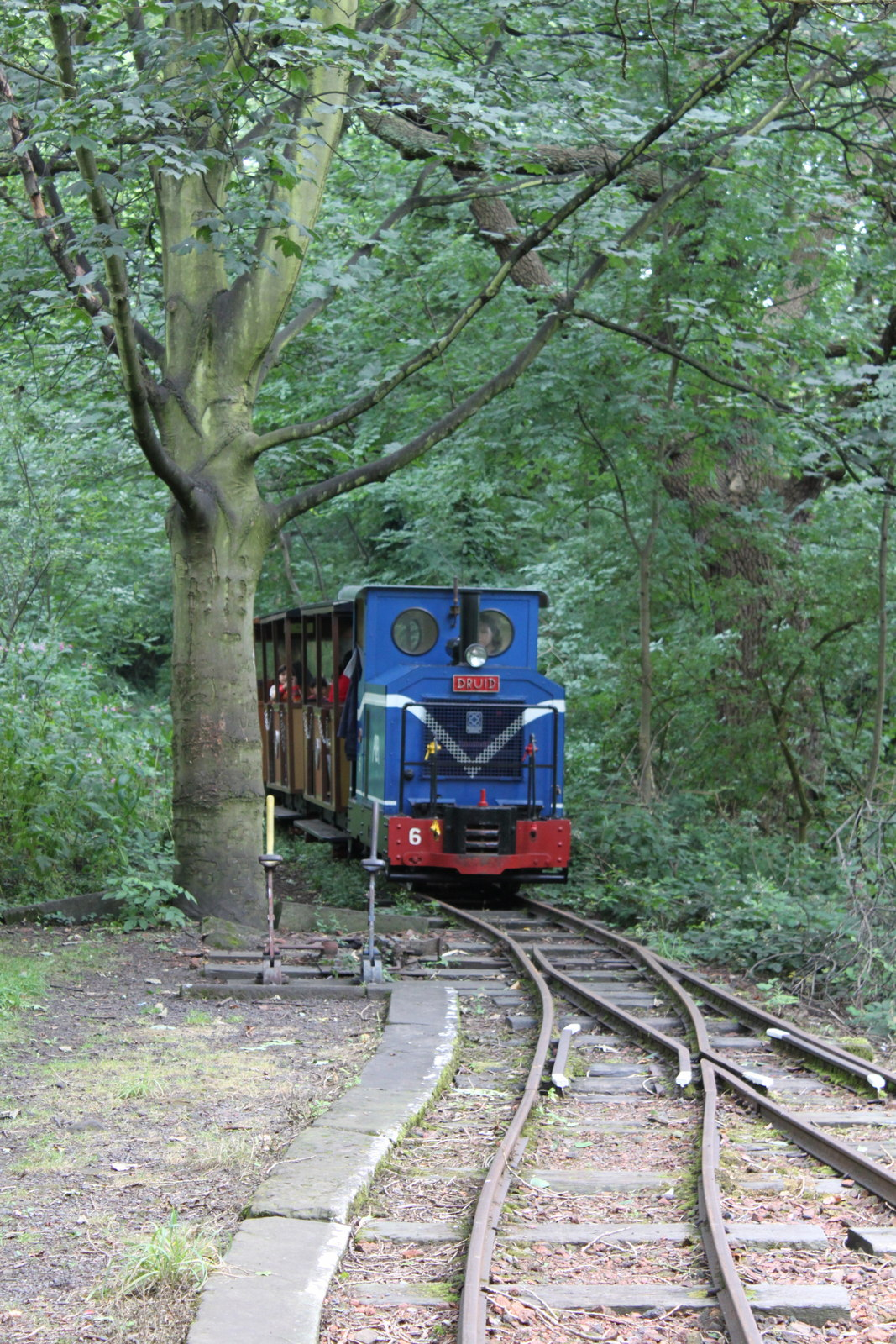

Overview
- Headquarters: Leeds
- Locale: England
- Dates of operation: 1974–2012

Technical
- Track gauge: 2 ft (610 mm)
- Length: 3/4 mile (1.2 km)

Other
- Website: Abbey Light Railway (Internet Archive)

The Abbey Light Railway was a 2 ft (610 mm) narrow gauge railway in Kirkstall, Leeds, West Yorkshire, England. Built by enthusiasts, the Railway ran from the nearby Bridge Road commercial area into the grounds of Kirkstall Abbey, operating most Sundays.

== History ==
In 1974, local engineer and lecturer at Kitson College Peter Lowe applied for planning permission to build a railway at Kirkstall.

From 1976, the line was built from scratch by a group of local enthusiasts, most of whom were members of the Ffestiniog Railway. Second hand rail was acquired from the Ffestiniog and the line was built over a number of years, eventually extending to 3/4 mile (1.2 km) from Kirkstall Abbey to Bridge Road, Kirkstall.

Initially the line ran purely as a private railway, but in 1986 it received permission to start public passenger services. These ran from Spring to Autumn, every Sunday and most Bank Holidays. The highlight of the year was the weekend Kirkstall Festival.

In 2006 plans were made to extend the line to the Armley Mills Industrial Museum nearby. This would have involved crossing both the River Aire and the Leeds and Liverpool Canal. The project was never realised.

After Peter Lowe died in October 2012, the railway closed and even though there were plans to resurrect services the following spring, without its Chief Engineer, it became difficult to obtain insurance. The decision was made to sell off the rolling stock and infrastructure. All but one of the locomotives and much other material was sold to the Welsh Highland Heritage Railway in Porthmadog and work to dismantle the railway began in February 2013.

== Locomotives ==
Number	Name	Builder	Type	Date	Works number	Notes
1	Loweco	Lister	0-4-0PM 6HP	1942	20449	Supplied new to Kelby Sand and Gravel Co. Lincolnshire. Later worked at Hoe Hill Tile works, Barton-upon-Humber. Became the first locomotive of the ALR. Now at Poppleton Community Railway Nursery, York.
2	Atlas	Hunslet	4wDM 20HP	1943	2465	Supplied new to the Ministry of Defence, then to the Strensall Brick and Tile works, finally worked at the Alne Tile works, near Selby. Now at Statfold Barn Railway.
3	Odin	Motor Rail	4wDM 20HP	1934	5859	Originally used as a contract locomotive, purchased by the Ham River Grit Co. Ltd then by Joseph Arnold & Sons, Leighton Buzzard. Now at Gelert's Farm works (WHHR), Porthmadog.
4	Vulcan	Ruston	4wDM 48DL	1940	198287	Supplied to Harpur Hill, Buxton then sold to the Royal Air Force at Burtonwood, some time spent at Fauld. Finally acquired by Yorkshire Water for use at Chellow Heights and Thornton Moor near Bradford. Taken back by Yorkshire Water and Donated Embsay and Bolton Abbey Steam Railway 2013. Vulcan was Advertised for sale in June 2022.
5		Ruston and Hornsby	4wDM 20HP	1946	235654	Supplied new to the Elsham Lime Co., sold to the Barrow Haven Tile works, Lincolnshire. Informally known on the ALR as Little Ruston.
6	Druid	Motor Rail	4wDM 20HP	1941	8644	Supplied new to the Ministry of Defense. Sold to the Alne Tile works. Purchased by the Creekmoor Light Railway at Poole. Has been heavily rebuilt at the ALR, with only the chassis, wheels, transmission and nameplate surviving from the original. It went to the Welsh Highland Heritage Railway before being sold on to Pen-Y-Bryn Railway which is a private railway.
7		Orenstein & Koppel	4wDM 11HP	1935	5926	Supplied new to Cape Universal Building Products Ltd., Uxbridge. Preserved at the Chalk Pits Museum, Amberley. Currently being rebuilt. Now at Gelert's Farm.
8		Robert Hudson Ltd	0-4-0 20HP	1924	39924	New to Lanarkshire county council, Cairngryffe Quarry near Biggar.
9		Muir-Hill	0-4-0 20HP	1925	110	New to Meeth Clay works, Devon. Purchased by Rich Morris and moved to Gloddfa Ganol. Purchased by the ALR in 1998. Now at Gelert's Farm.
10		Baguley	0-4-0 10HP	1917	736	New to War Department Light Railways. Returned to Baguley's and sold to Bristol Corporation Waterworks, Blagdon reservoir. Now at Gelert's Farm.
11		Baguley	0-4-0 10HP	1917	760	New to APCM Ltd., Bidwell Clay pit, Dunstable, then to Alan Keef, Aylesbury. Purchased by Rich Morris in 1965 and moved to Gloddfa Ganol in 1978. Sold to the Abbey Light Railway in 1998, now at the Welsh Highland Heritage Railway.
12	"George"	Greenbat	4wBE	1957	2848	New to Chemical and Insulating Co. Ltd, Faverdale, Darlington thence to R. Stewart, North Yorkshire. Now at Ripon & District Light Railway (private line).

== See also ==
- British narrow gauge railways
