= Brockham Limeworks =

Nature reserve in Surrey, United Kingdom

Coordinates: 51.248°N 0.275°W

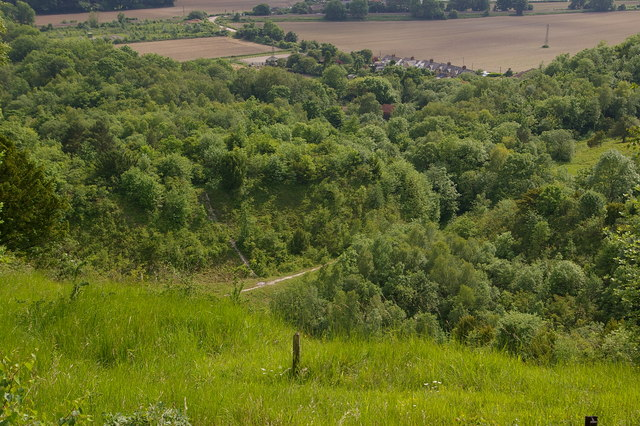
- Interactive map of Brockham Limeworks
- Type: Nature reserve
- Location: Brockham, Surrey
- OS grid: TQ205513
- Area: 45 hectares (110 acres)

Brockham Limeworks is a 45-hectare (110-acre) nature reserve north of Brockham in Surrey. It is owned by Surrey County Council. Part of it is a Scheduled Monument, and it is part of the Mole Gap to Reigate Escarpment Site of Special Scientific Interest and Special Area of Conservation.

Digging on this former chalk quarry continued on the site until 1936. It had two batteries of lime kilns, which have become roosting sites for bats. Some of the floor of the quarry has become species rich chalk grassland, with plants such as broad-leaved helleborine and pyramidal, common spotted, fragrant and bee orchids.

There is access from The Coombe in Betchworth.

From 1962 the limeworks was home to the Brockham Railway Museum, a collection of narrow-gauge locomotives and rolling stock. A short demonstration line was built. The museum closed in 1982, and most of the exhibits were moved to the Amberley Museum & Heritage Centre.
