= F. C. Hibberd & Co. =

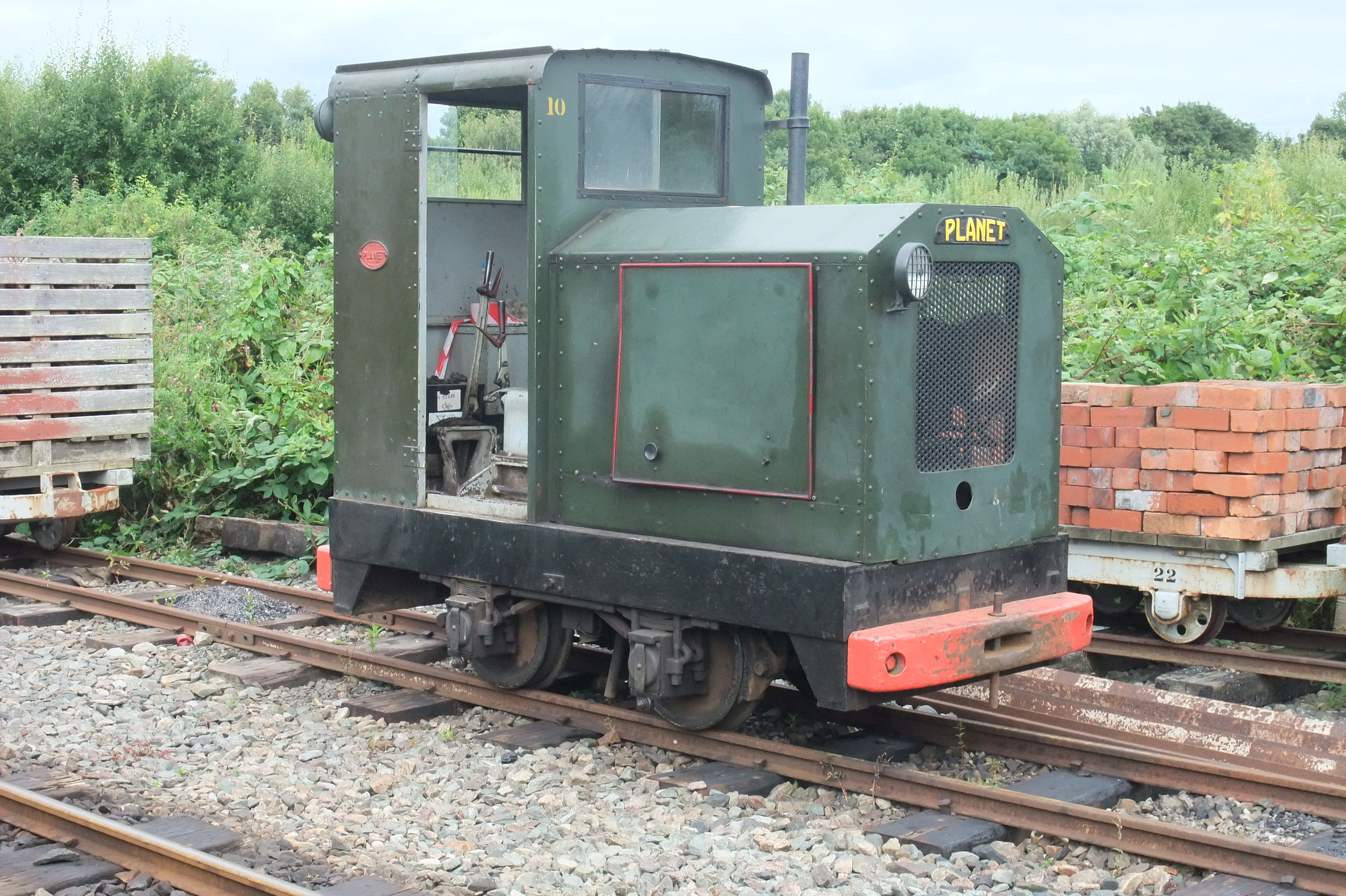
Hibberd Planet diesel shunter at WLLR

F. C. Hibberd & Co Ltd was a British locomotive-building company founded in 1927 to build industrial petrol and diesel locomotives.

Kent Construction and Engineering Co of Ashford, Kent had been reconditioning and reselling former military locomotives sold off as surplus at the end of World War I, though it had also developed its own narrow gauge locomotive design. It closed its works in 1926 and two of the directors of Honeywill Brothers Limited - F.C. Hibberd and D.A. Dwyer (Honeywill had marketed the Kent Construction locomotives) bought out the Kent Construction Business and its stock of locomotives, and in 1927 formed F.C. Hibberd & Co Ltd. In 1932 the company acquired the goodwill of James and Frederick Howard Limited and the company moved to Park Royal, London, and began manufacturing locomotives.

Many of Hibberd's locomotives were small machines with final drive by roller chain but it also built some larger ones with side-rod drive. The latter bore a strong resemblance to Hudswell Clarke products.

Hibberd used the name Planet for their locomotives but this should not be confused with the much earlier Planet steam locomotive.

== Other companies ==
From 1956 Thomas Hill, sold Hibberd locomotives to non-Hibberd customers on an informal commission basis until 1960. The relationship ended because Hibberd were becoming worried that Thomas Hill would sell their own locomotives to customers in preference to the Hibberd product.

The company was acquired by Butterley Engineering in the early 1960s and in 1964 production was moved to Ripley, Derbyshire. The last locomotive built to a Hibberd design was delivered in 1968.

== History of the Planet name ==
The origin of the "Planet" petrol locomotive can be traced back to the Kent Construction and Engineering Company of Ashford, Kent. After World War I, Kent Construction purchased a large number of Government-surplus petrol locomotives which they reconditioned and offered for sale. These included both Motor Rail "Simplex" and American Baldwin Locomotive Works products. Kent Construction later produced a range of locomotives to their own designs. These were based on the Motor Rail "Simplex" but were given the name "Planet". They were sold through Honeywill Brothers of London.

Kent Construction closed in 1926 and "Planet" locomotives were then manufactured by Stableford and Company, wagon builders, of Coalville, Leicestershire until they went out of business in 1928. From this time "Planet" locomotives were built by Bedford Engineering Co Ltd, makers of rail and other cranes, of Ampthill Road, Bedford but they failed in 1932, as did the adjacent huge iron works of James and Frederick Howard whose products had included both narrow gauge and standard gauge locomotives since the mid-1920s. "Planet" locomotives were then built by Hibberd in Park Royal, London including models based closely on the designs obtained from Howard of Bedford.

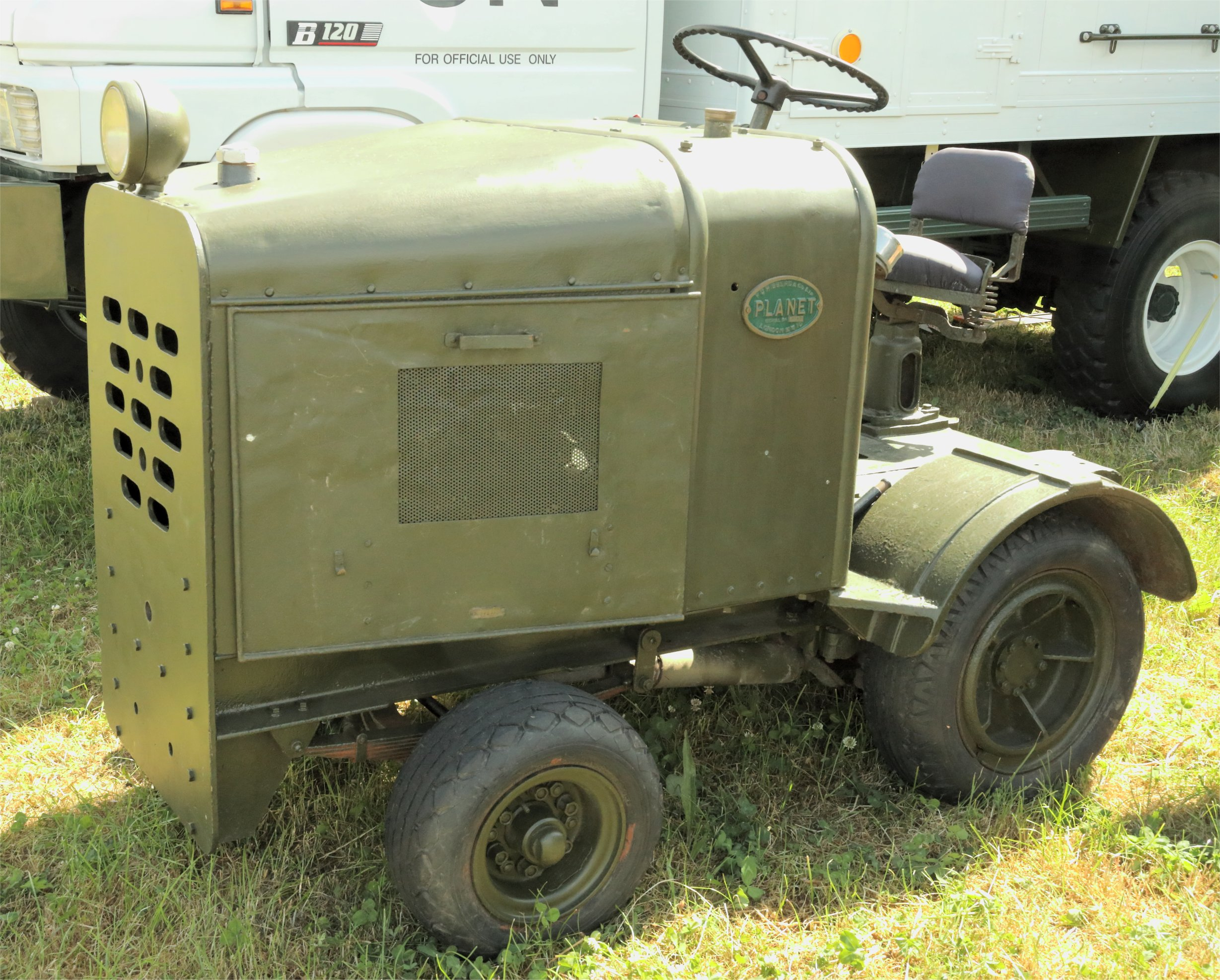
F.C.Hibberd "Planet" light tractor

In 1935, Hibberd diversified with the production of a light wheeled tractor for use in or between factories, or on the road. This was available initially with a 4-cylinder petrol engine and either pneumatic or solid tyres - layout was conventional with front steering and driven rear axle. The Hibberd light truck was introduced in 1937 with the Model B (of 2 ton capacity) and Model C (of 25-30 cwt capacity) - which were available with fixed or elevating load platforms and with 8 hp petrol or 10 hp horizontally opposed oil engines. Steering and driving was by the closely spaced front wheels. The original tractor design continued in production during and after WW2 and was available with a variety of engines, including a Ford 4-cylinder industrial petrol engine or an oil engine. A flameproof version was available for working in potentially explosive areas. A number of these were bought by British European Airways in 1947 to tow aircraft. The diesel engined version of these tractors (equipped with Fowler-Sanders 2DX engines) was to be adopted by Butlins Holiday Camps and Whipsnade Zoo to tow trains of up to 6 passenger trailers each carrying 12 people. The Butlins trailers were made by Barnards Ltd of Norwich and had vacuum servo brakes operated from the tractor. In 1950 the Fowler engine in the diesel versions of the "Planet" tractor was replaced by the Turner V-twin diesel engine with 4 speed integral gearbox.

A newspaper article about the Hibberd Works in 1951 stated that the Park Royal factory was responsible for design and assembly of the locomotives and tractors, with manufacture of the big components being "farmed out" all over the country. The finished products were assembled at Park Royal with parts from as many as 200 different suppliers. The tractors were still available with solid or pneumatic tyres, petrol (Ford) or diesel engines, and the flameproof version of the diesel tractor specially designed for use in explosives magazines (one of which is pictured being assembled destined for the Indian Army).

The road tractors and the rail locomotives seem to have been numbered in the same sequence.

== Preservation in the United Kingdom ==
=== Railway Locomotives ===
Sources for this list include the UK Heritage Railways database. All locomotives are standard gauge except where shown in the notes:

Name or number	Industrial owner	Works no.	Build date	Wheels	Power (bhp)	Preserved at	Notes
	Portland Cement, Sittingbourne	1568	1927	4wPM		Leighton Buzzard Light Railway In storage	2 ft (610 mm) gauge
No 21	Worthington Brewery, Burton upon Trent	1612	1929	4wPM	Originally Dorman 4JO	Chasewater Railway	
		1830		4wDM		Westonzoyland Pumping Station Museum	2 ft (610 mm) gauge
	Crowle Brickworks, Scunthorpe	1881	1934	4wPM	Ford 8 hp	Crowle Peatland Railway	2 ft (610 mm) gauge
	City of Chichester Sewage Works	1980	1936	4wDM		Amberley Museum Railway	2 ft (610 mm) gauge
Nippy	Mines and Safety Research, Buxton, Derbyshire	2014	1936	4wDM	20 hp National Twin-Cylinder	Irish Steam Preservation Society	3 ft (914 mm) gauge
	Preston Irwell Valley Water Board (ordered by Gravelworks Ltd)	2025	1937	4wDM	12-16 hp Lister CE Twin-Cylinder Diesel	Amerton Railway	2 ft (610 mm) gauge
	Queen's Pier Tramway, Ramsey, Isle of Man	2027	1937	4wPM	4-cylinder Ford (car) petrol engine	Queen's Pier, Ramsey, Isle of Man	3 ft (914 mm) gauge
Beryl	Bournemouth Gas and Water Co then later by Corralls Ltd, Hamworthy, Poole	2054	1938	4wPM	54 hp, 4-cylinder Dorman 4JORX, petrol-paraffin engine	Swanage Railway	
T1	Shell-Mex and BP	2102	1938	4wDM	75 hp	Buckinghamshire Railway Centre	
Berrylands	GLC Berrylands Sewage Works	2201	1939	4wDM	16 hp Lister CE Twin-Cylinder Diesel	Devon Railway Centre	2 ft (610 mm) gauge
Tom Bombadil	Butterley & Blaby Brick Companies	2415	1941	4wDM		Leighton Buzzard Light Railway	2 ft (610 mm) gauge
Corbiere	Ministry of Defence depot, Liphook	2528	1941	4wDM	National Twin-Cylinder	Old Kiln Light Railway	2 ft (610 mm) gauge
Frank		2896	1944	4wDM	35 hp	Nene Valley Railway	
4007	Canning Town Glass Works	3147	1947	4wDM	52 hp	Colne Valley Railway	
Carpenter	Guinness, Park Royal, London	3270	1948	0-4-0DM	144 hp	Cholsey & Wallingford Railway	
Walrus	Guinness, Park Royal, London	3271	1949	0-4-0DM	144 hp	Buckinghamshire Railway Centre	
Dudley	Barking Power, London	3294	1948	4wDM		Waltham Abbey Royal Gunpowder Mills	
Ashover	Ashover Light Railway	3307	1948	0-4-0DM		Ffestiniog Railway	1 ft 11 1/2 in (597 mm) gauge
Ivan	Metropolitan Water Board, Kempton Park Works	3317	1948	0-4-0DM	4-cylinder Petrol	North Gloucestershire Railway	2 ft (610 mm) gauge
	National Benzole Stanlow refinery	3438	1950	4wDM		East Lancashire Railway	
Ald Hague	Dukinfield Sewage Works, Ashton-under-Lyne	3465	1950	4wPM		Moseley Railway Trust	2 ft (610 mm) gauge
23	Irish Shell	3509	1951	4wDM	79 hp	Railway Preservation Society of Ireland, Whitehead	5 ft 3 in (1,600 mm) gauge
Elizabeth	Hartley Quarry, Kirkby Stephen	3598	1962	0-4-0DM	N.B. - now carries replacement Leyland Bus engine	Stainmore Railway Company at Kirkby Stephen East	
Upnor Castle	Chattenden & Upnor Railway	3687	1954	4wDM	180 hp	Welsh Highland Railway	1 ft 11 1/2 in (597 mm) gauge
Rochester Castle	Royal Navy, Chatham	3738	1955	4wDM		Chatham Historic Dockyard	
Upnor Castle	Royal Navy, Chatham	3742	1955	4wDM			
Leeds Castle	Royal Navy, Chatham	3745	1955	4wDM			
Tarmac	Tarmac, Hayes	3765	1955	4wDM	57 hp	Buckinghamshire Railway Centre	
Dover Castle	Royal Navy, Chatham	3770	1955	4wDM			
Cooling Castle	Royal Navy, Chatham	3771	1955	4wDM			
Deal Castle	Royal Navy, Chatham	3772	1955	4wDM			
Pluto	Royal Navy, Rosyth	3777	1955/6	4wDM	105 hp	Derwent Valley Light Railway, York	
		3787	1956	4wDM		Hampton Kempton Waterworks Railway	2 ft (610 mm) gauge
Conway Castle	Royal Naval Armaments Depot, Ernesettle, Plymouth	3831	1958	4wDM	180 hp	Welsh Highland Railway, Caernarfon	1 ft 11 1/2 in (597 mm) gauge
Previously Kingsley	British Industrial Sand Ltd, Redhill	3832	1957	4wDM	117 hp	Bideford Railway Heritage Centre	
ARC Powell Duffryn		3890	1958	4wDH		Garw Valley Railway	
Planet/Pluto		3947	1960	4wDM	74.5 hp	Vale of Berkeley Railway	Fully restored 2024
Hylton		3967	1961	4wDH		Northamptonshire Ironstone Railway Trust	
		4006	1963	4wDH		Garw Valley Railway	
ULLR	Sanders & Forster Ltd	4008	1963	4wDM	9 hp Lister FR1 Diesel	Steeple Grange Light Railway	18 in (457 mm) gauge

=== Planet Tractors/Trucks ===
A number of these exist in private ownership. They are very sturdily built.

Original owner	Works no.	Build date	Model	Preserved at	Notes
	3097		4-cylinder petrol	Private ownership	Fully restored 2026
	3157	1947	2-cylinder Fowler Heavy Duty diesel	Private ownership	Running but unrestored 2026
Thomas Holmes and Sons tannery, Sculcoates Lane, Hull	3230	1947	4-cylinder Ford petrol	Hull Museum (not on display)	Registration Number JKH144
Royal Navy dockyard			Twin-cylinder Fowler diesel number 2D856	Private ownership	Fitted with cab
Western Counties Hospital Group in Starcross		1948		Private ownership	Was road registered
Butlins				Lincolnshire Aviation Heritage Centre	Engine was at some stage replaced with a 2-cylinder Lister
British Railways		1950s	V-twin Turner diesel	Private ownership	Registration number was HUV266 (British Rail number S761). Used at main stations to move baggage trolleys on the platforms.

== Preservation in Ireland ==
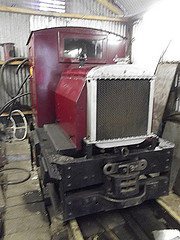
1936 built Planet engine Nippy preserved at Stradbally Co. Laois

Nippy, a former Mines and Safety Research engine from Buxton, Derbyshire, works number 2014 and built in 1936, is currently preserved at the Stradbally Woodland Express Railway. It is run on occasion for demonstration purposes. Several Guinness brewery Planets have been preserved also, surviving in the Guinness Storehouse museum, The Ulster Folk and Transport Museum in Cultra Co. Down, and three at the Cavan & Leitrim Railway in Dromod. The former Irish Shell No 23 is preserved at RPSI Whitehead.

== Preservation in Italy ==
Locomotive 3944, built in 1960 is now located as a static 'gate guardian' display at the premises of Vaia Car, Calvisano, in Italy.

== Preservation in Australia ==
=== Australia ===
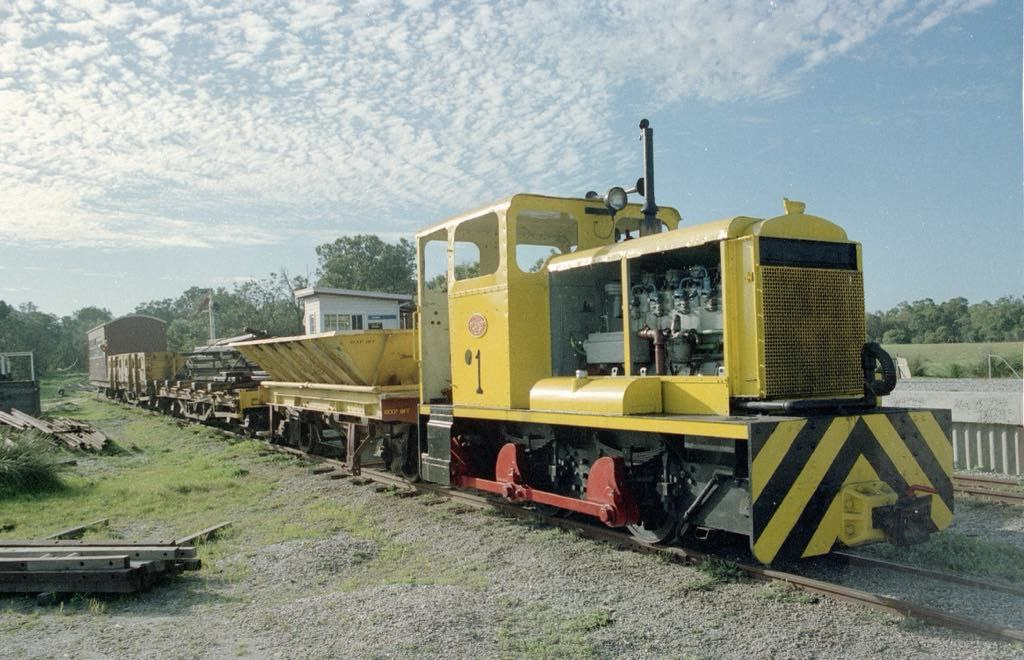
F.C Hibberd 'Planet' 0-4-0DM (1939) circa mid 1980's before it was rebuilt with an ex-WAGR Track Machine 3-cylinder GM 53-series motor

In 1976, The Western Australian Light Railway Preservation Society acquired a 1939 model Planet Locomotive from the Kalgoorlie Lake View and Star Gold mine for a total of $500AU, including spares. After considerable restoration work, the locomotive was moved to Whiteman Park in Perth in 1983 and moved under its own power for the first time in 1985. In recent years, the WA Light Railway Preservation Society bought a 1962 model planet locomotive.

The 1939 Planet (now known as Planet #7) is now the mainstay of the Bennett Brook Railway's Diesel Fleet. The 1962 Planet (now known as Planet #8) is now also operational at Bennett Brook Railway. Both locomotives run on 2' gauge track. Over the years, multiple modifications have been made to both of Bennett Brook Railway's Planets, including: The installation of a Vacuum brake system, the addition of a Jones Coupler style coupler along with the already installed Link and Pin couplers and Raising the roof of the cab on Planet #7, and a new cab design and paint scheme to reflect its operating heritage on Planet #8.

There are also 3 preserved Planet locomotives in New South Wales. These were originally imported from the U.K. for construction of the warragamba dam in western Sydney all 3 are standard gauge units, One of them #52 is at the Lachlan Vally Railway in Cowra and is fully operational. Another preserved Planet locomotive is #54 at the Richmond Vale railway line. the third is located at Dorrigo Steam Railway and Museum.

=== New Zealand ===
Two Planet locomotives from the Grassmere Salt Works are preserved at the Ferrymead Two Foot Railway in New Zealand. Another is preserved at a pioneer village in Kaikohe. One is preserved at Pukemiro
