= Penmaenmawr & Welsh Granite Co. =

Welsh granite company (19th century)

Coordinates: 53.260°N 3.949°W

- Cover of a Company brochure from the 1920s

Overview
- Headquarters: Penmaenmawr
- Locale: Wales
- Dates of operation: 1830s–1960s
- Successor: Abandoned

Technical
- Track gauge: 3 ft (914 mm)

The Penmaenmawr & Welsh Granite Co. owned and operated a major granite quarry on the north Wales coast located between Conwy and Llanfairfechan. Granite axe-heads and other implements from Neolithic quarries at Penmaenmawr have been found throughout Britain.

In the 1830s commercial granite quarries were opened on Penmaenmawr to meet the growing demand for granite setts. The granite was lowered from the quarry by self-acting inclines to the 3 ft (914 mm) narrow gauge tramway which ran to jetties from where the setts were loaded into ships. The standard gauge Chester to Holyhead railway reached Penmaenmawr in 1848, after which the majority of the quarry output was sent by rail.

The quarry and its internal narrow gauge railway continued to thrive during the nineteenth century. Production at the quarry continues in 2006, though the railway was replaced by trucks in the 1960s.

== Locomotives ==
Name	Builder	Type	Date	Works number	Notes
Penmaen	De Winton	0-4-0VB	1878		The remains of the locomotive remain at the quarry
Llanfair	De Winton	0-4-0VB	1895		Preserved at Gloddfa Ganol until 1997. Now at the Welsh Highland Railway, Dinas railway station.
Louisa	De Winton	0-4-0VB			Scrapped
Watkin	De Winton	0-4-0VB			Preserved at the Welsh Highland Railway, Caernarfon
Hughie	Hunslet	0-4-0ST	1899	706	Delivered in January 1900. Out of use by April 1942. Scrapped by 1951
Stephen	Hunslet	0-4-0ST	1902	771	Out of use by April 1942. Scrapped by 1951
Singapore	Hunslet	0-4-0ST	1903	798	Scrapped 1951
Donald	Hunslet	0-4-0ST	1905	866	Out of use in August 1948. Scrapped 1951
Tiger	Hunslet	0-4-0ST	1902	764	Inside cylinders. Out of use by April 1942. Scrapped 1951

== See also ==
- British industrial narrow gauge railways
