= Cadeby Light Railway =

Railway in Leicestershire, England

Coordinates: 52.617545°N 1.372508°W

Overview
- Headquarters: Cadeby
- Locale: England
- Dates of operation: 1963–2005
- Successor: abandoned

Technical
- Track gauge: 2 ft (610 mm)
- Length: 97 yards (89 m)

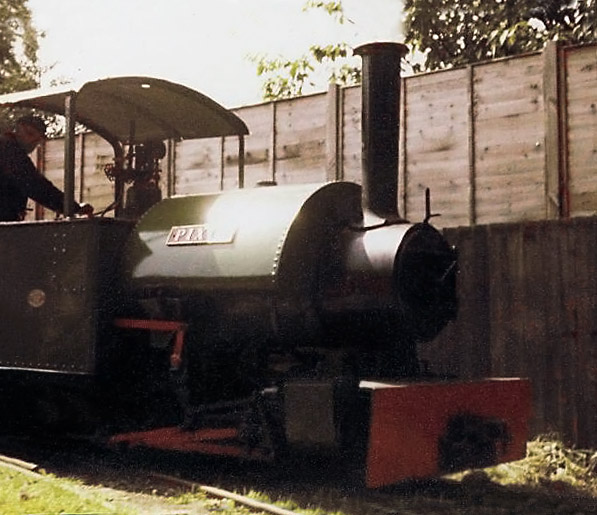
Pixie at Cadeby in 1981

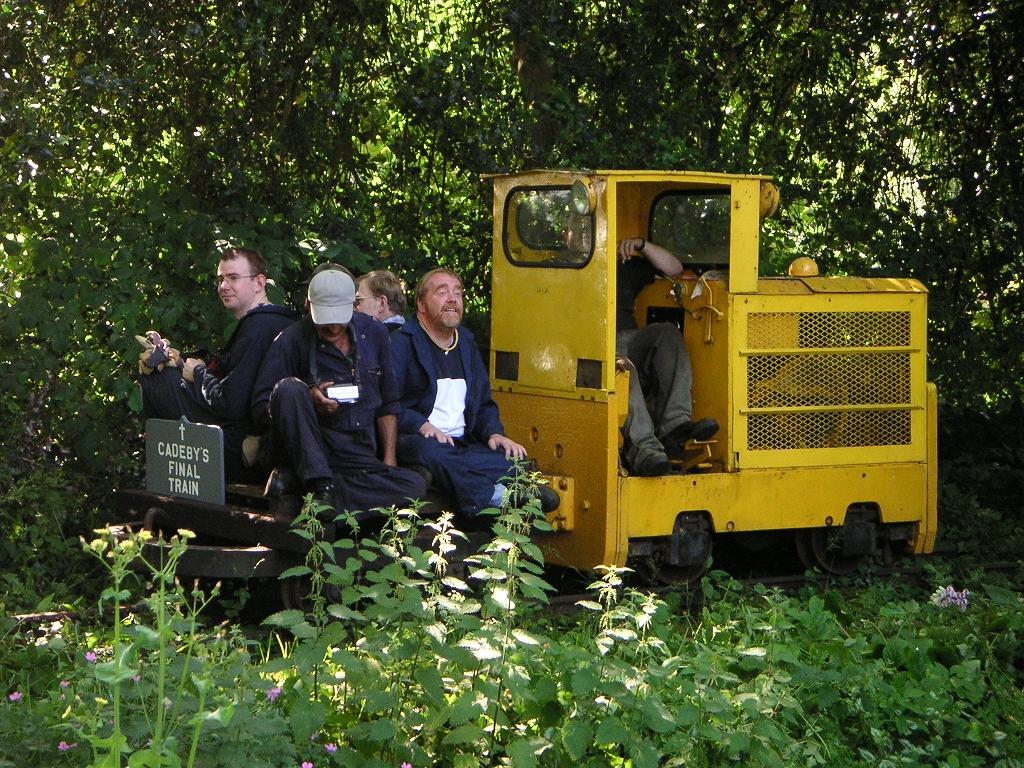
The last train at Cadeby, 2005

The Cadeby Light Railway was a 2 ft (610 mm) narrow-gauge railway in the garden of the rectory in Cadeby, Leicestershire.

In the early 1960s the Reverend Teddy Boston became rector of All Saints' Church, Cadeby. Boston was a lifelong railway enthusiast and wanted to build a miniature railway in his new garden, but the cost proved prohibitive. Instead he searched for a full-sized narrow-gauge locomotive.

In 1962, he purchased Pixie, a W.G. Bagnall 0-4-0ST from the Cranford quarry. The quarry owners donated a short length of track and two wagons and the Cadeby Light Railway was opened.

Over the years, Boston built an extensive collection of ex-industrial narrow-gauge rolling stock, which ran on the extremely short line in his garden. He also maintained an extensive OO gauge model railway at Cadeby.

Although Boston died in 1986, his widow, Audrey kept the railway open for nearly twenty years, holding regular open days.

The railway finally closed in May 2005. The majority of the collection has been amalgamated with the Moseley Railway Trust at the Apedale Community Country Park. As of 2014, Pixie was undergoing restoration.

== Collection ==
In 1982, Boston's collection consisted of:

Name	Wheel Arrangement	Manufacturer	Works Number	Year
Margaret	0-4-0ST	Hunslet Engine Co.	605	1894
No.2	0-4-0WT	Orenstein & Koppel	7529	1914
Pixie	0-4-0ST	W.G. Bagnall	2090	1919
87004	4wDM	Motor Rail	2197	1922
	0-4-0PM	Baguley	1695	1928
	4wDM	Motor Rail	4572	1929
	4wDM	Hudswell Clarke	D558	1930
1	4wDM	Motor Rail	5609	1931
New Star	4wPM	Lister	4088	1931
24	4wDM	Motor Rail	5853	1934
	4wDM	Ruston & Hornsby	179870	1936
42	4wDM	Motor Rail	7710	1939
20	4wDM	Motor Rail	8748	1942

== See also ==
- Moseley Railway Trust
- British narrow-gauge railways
