= Steeple Grange Light Railway =

Narrow gauage visitor attraction railway

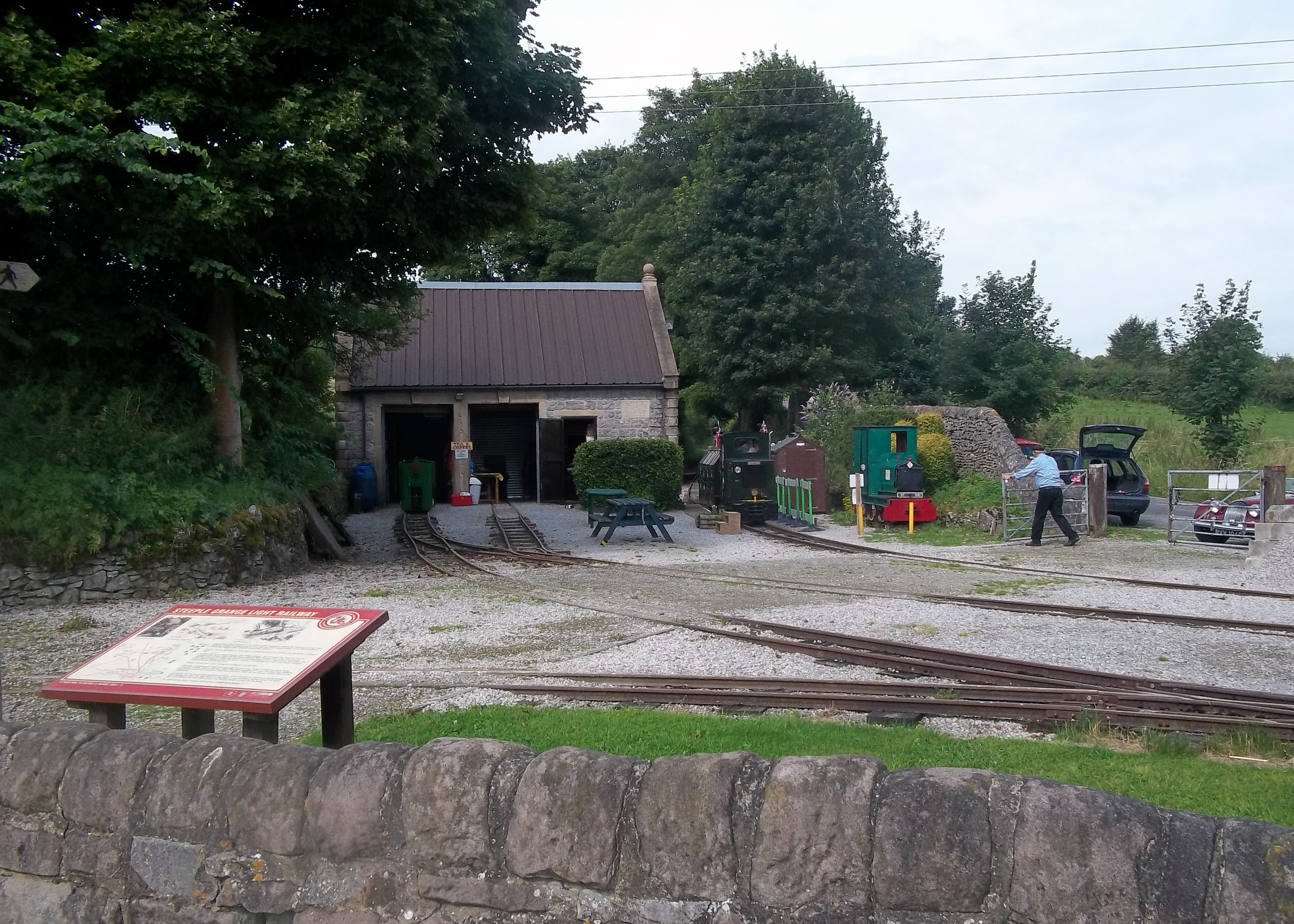
- Locale: Old Porter Lane, Derbyshire DE4 4GE, England
- Terminus: Steeple Grange
- Coordinates: 53.0956°N 1.5709°W
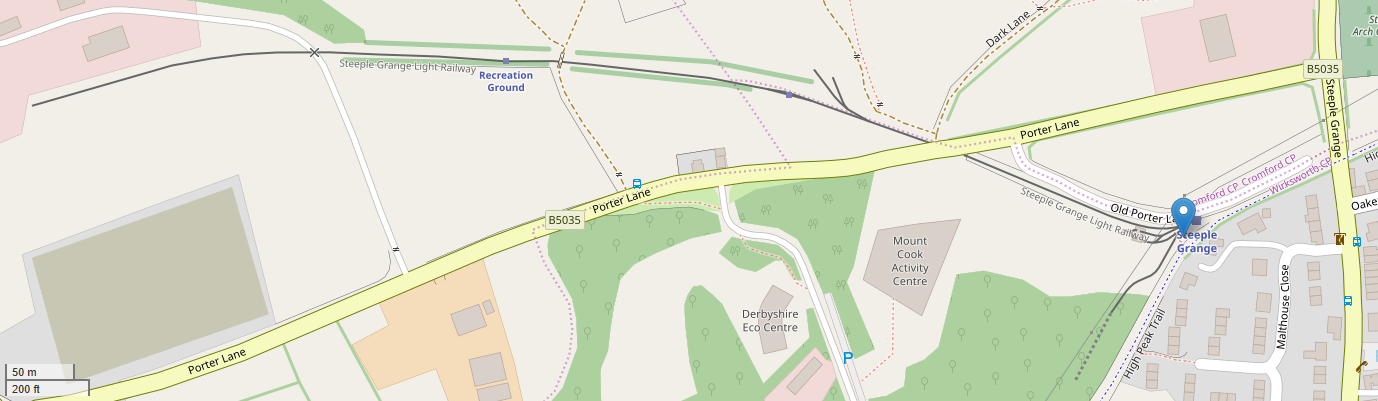

Commercial operations
- Original gauge: 4 ft 8 1/2 in (1,435 mm) standard gauge

Preserved operations
- Length: 1/2 mile (0.80 km)
- Preserved gauge: 18 in (457 mm)

Commercial history
- Opened: 1985

Website
- sglr.co.uk

The Steeple Grange Light Railway is a narrow-gauge heritage railway visitor attraction near Wirksworth in Derbyshire, England. Opened in 1985 on the trackbed of a disused branch line, it uses industrial locomotives and rolling stock from disused mines, quarries, and steelworks around the country.

== Line ==
The Steeple Grange Light Railway is a 0.62-mile (1.0 km) 18 in (457 mm) gauge narrow gauge line running from outside Wirksworth to Middleton in Derbyshire, built in 1985 on trackbed of the former Killer's Branch line of the Cromford and High Peak Railway and with a 220-yard (200 m) branch line subsequently added.

A pathway leads from Main Street in Middleton to the station. A carriage and wagon shed at Dark Lane houses the railway's coaching stock, maintenance wagons, and locomotives under maintenance. Middleton station was reached in 2019. The level crossing up from Lawson's Loop is operated by the guard from the passing train, raising flags at a 90-degree angle with the red flag straight out to warn oncoming vehicles and the yellow flag above the guard's head to allow the train to pass by safely. The line features a steep 1:27 (3.7 %) gradient incline.

== Locomotives ==
As of July 2022 the railway has 20 locomotives.

=== Greenbat ===
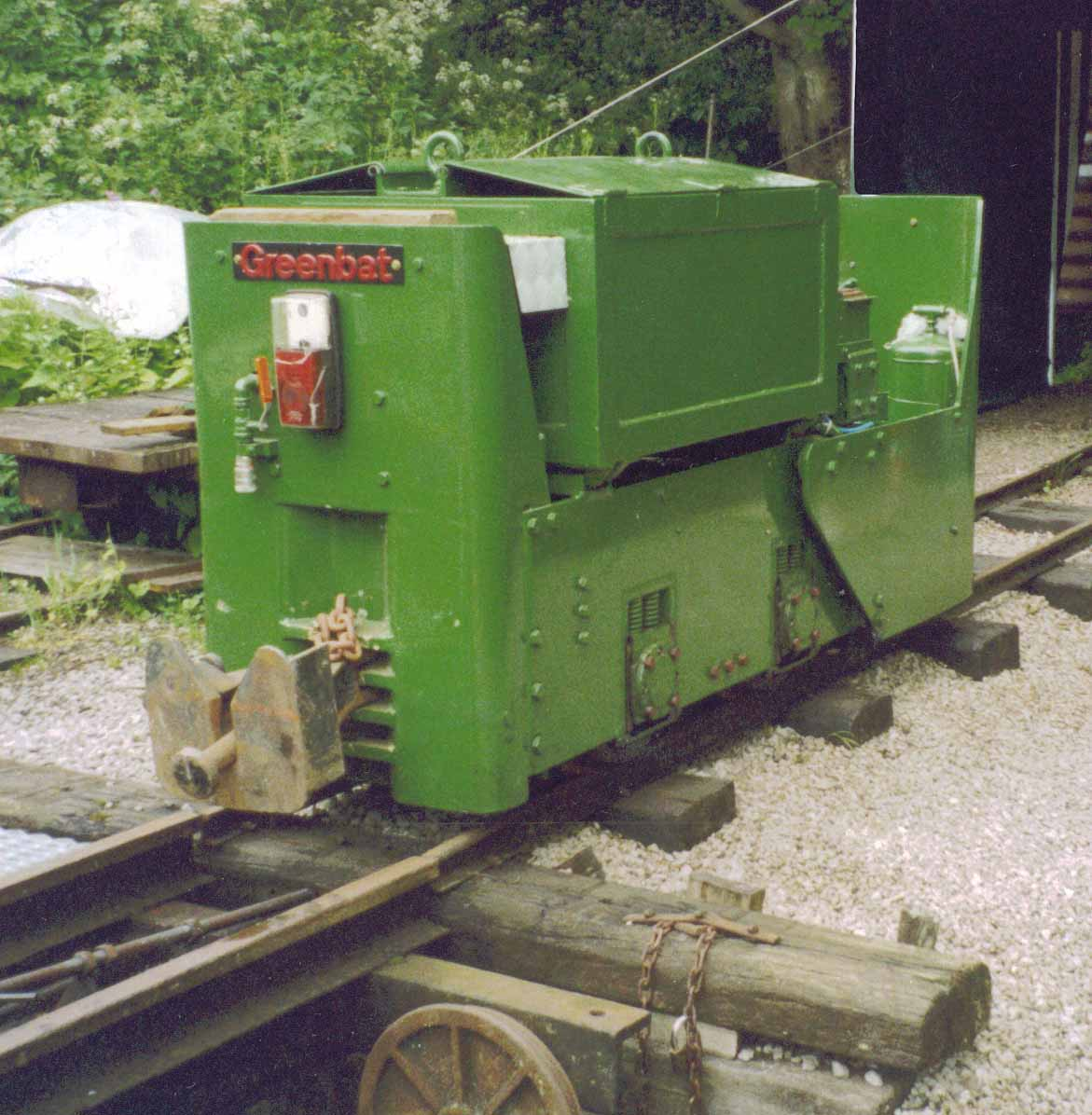
Greenbat

The railway's main locomotive is Greenbat, a 1.5 long tons (1.52 t; 1.68 short tons), 5 hp (3.7 kW) "trammer" type battery locomotive built by Greenwood and Batley of Leeds. Greenbat incorporated a folding cab, to allow the locomotive to fit down small mineshafts. It was ordered by Halesowen Steel Co, who specifically requested the cab be fixed. Greenbat has never been underground, working in various steel mills.

Greenbat was preserved by Adrian Booth, who passed it on to the SGLR when the line was in its infancy. It was fitted with air braking, and coupled to an ex-NCB manrider has provided nearly 15 years of service. In 2005 it received new batteries, the old ones having last 15 years out of a lifespan of 10. Greenbat is the primary use locomotive at the railway, being used for normal day trips, private parties and Santa Specials (banked by ZM32 Horwich on these days).

Motor: 1× GB type T2
Drive: worm and wheel to each axle
Voltage: 48 V, Lead acid batteries

=== ZM32 Horwich ===
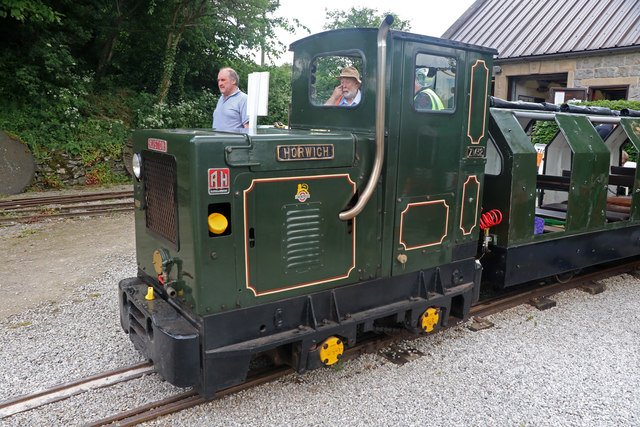
ZM32 at Steeplehouse station

ZM32 Horwich was built in 1957 and was given the works number of 416214. This locomotive is the only 18 in (457 mm) gauge Ruston and Hornsby LAT in existence. It was bought by British Railways to work at their Horwich works in Lancashire, and was preserved alongside Wren at the National Railway Museum. It was initially being sent to a banana plantation in South America; however, it was abandoned in Liverpool docks until bought for the Gloddfa Ganol museum in Wales. Here, it was regauged to 2 ft (610 mm) and restored to working order. When Gloddfa Ganol closed, it was bought by an SGLR member, restored to 18 in gauge and fitted with airbraking.

A gearbox failure led to it being taken to Dorothea Restorations for a complete overhaul. Horwich is now back on the line, painted in BR green and used alternately with Greenbat. It was recently voted the most popular non-steam narrow-gauge locomotive. This locomotive is regularly used a banker to help locomotive Greenbat up the line to Santa's Grotto on Santa Special weekends in December.

Engine: Ruston and Hornsby 20 hp (15 kW) diesel
Transmission: Hydraulic, 2 gear box

=== Hudson ===
This locomotive is unusual, being home built. The SGLR was originally started with stock from Ladywash Mine, near Eyam in Derbyshire. The only locomotive was No.6, which was in a very poor condition. Before Greenbat arrived, it was decided that one of the four-wheel Ladywash Hudson manriders should be converted to a locomotive. This was done by Alwyn Ambrey in 1988, using a Villiers engine and transmission from a cricket pitch roller. It was able to seat two passengers and the driver, but the drive was geared too highly for the engine to cope with the gradient on the line. This and the engine being in poor state meant it was used very little.

The locomotive was worked on by various people in the late 1990s, finally being finished by J Scott in 2003. Scott refurbished the engine, thus largely solving the underpowering problem, and fitted a much better braking system. Two years later, a new engine was found. It is functionally the same as the old one, but has a 3:1 reduction gearbox fitted. Although not a complete fix, this addition has greatly improved its haulage capacity. The locomotive is not in regular use because of its insufficient pulling capacity and horsepower required to climb the grade before Middleton station.

Engine: 3½ HP Villiers Mk25 with reduction box
Transmission: Cup and cone reversing clutch and chain drive

=== Claytons ===
The railway has three battery Claytons of similar designs in private ownership. L10 (works Order No. 5431 of January 1968) and L16 (W/O No. B0109B of March 1973, named Peggy) are 1 3/4 long tons (1.8 t; 2.0 short tons), 7 hp (5.2 kW) low-height locomotives. They were both bought directly from industrial use. Peggy has recently been restored to operating condition, and is running using the redundant 15-year-old batteries from Greenbat. Peggy is fitted with a cam-contactor controller and resistances for speed control. Peggy serves as the primary locomotive for work trains on the SGLR, taking volunteers up and down the line to do rail and infrastructure maintenance, often seen with the tool wagon being shunted back and forth. Peggy also works on the branchline trains down into the quarry, interchanging with Peter every so often.

Lady Margorie is a compact 7 hp (5.2 kW), 1 3/4 long tons (1.8 t; 2.0 short tons) Clayton. Designed to work in 4 ft (1.22 m) diameter sewer pipes, it even has a "barn roof" style battery box top to make maximum use of confined space. It has an electronic controller, as opposed to the more usual resistance type. On 20 May 2012 Lady Margorie was renamed Peter after the late Peter Sellers, the society chairman.

=== Ladywash Mine No.6 ===
This was the first locomotive on the railway, bought with a large amount of track and rolling stock from Ladywash Mine, near Eyam in Derbyshire. It is a 10 hp (7.5 kW), 3 long tons (3.05 t; 3.36 short tons) design also from Greenwood and Batley.

It spent all its working life at Ladywash, acquiring some unconventional but highly useful modifications – the works photo appears in Adrian Booth's book on Greenwood and Batley, and is very different from its current form. It was also fitted with a thyristor controller, which was removed before being sold.

It arrived at the SGLR in a poor state of repair, which along with the lack of controller meant it was moved around various sidings unused. Eventually it was bought in 2004, and work finally started on its restoration. Following removal from the site for shotblasting, the frames have been repainted and the axleboxes overhauled. Now back on site, it is currently a rolling chassis with brake gear being overhauled. Where necessary, new parts are being machined by its owner. Work is also currently underway on the manufacture of a replacement controller, making use of contactors and resistances from other electrical machines. Future work includes overhaul of the two traction motors, some attention to one of the gearboxes and re-cabling before reassembly.

Motors: 2× GB type T2
Batteries: 60V lead-acid
Weight: 3 tons new, 3¼–3½ tons with modifications

== See also ==
- List of British heritage and private railways
- British narrow gauge railways
