= Sundon Chalk Quarry =

Quarry in Bedfordshire, England

Coordinates: 51.936758°N 0.48935°W

- Site of Special Scientific Interest
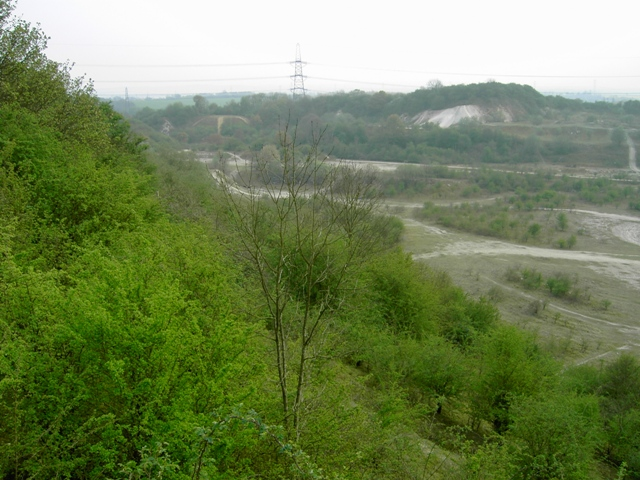
- Location of Sundon Chalk Quarry.
- Area of search: Bedfordshire
- Grid reference: TL039275
- Interest: Biological
- Area: 26.2 ha (65 acres)
- Notification date: 1989
- Location map: Magic Map

Sundon Chalk Quarry is a 26.2-hectare (65-acre) biological Site of Special Scientific Interest in Upper Sundon in Bedfordshire. It was notified in 1989 under Section 28 of the Wildlife and Countryside Act 1981, and the local planning authority is Central Bedfordshire Council. The site is privately owned but there is free public access.

The quarry was established to provide chalk and marl for the Sundon cement works, which operated between 1899 and 1976. The site is part of a large complex of disused chalk quarries, and its varied habitats include fens, lakes, chalk grassland, scrub and woodland. Interesting chalkland plants found here include ploughman’s spikenard, wild liquorice and woolly thistle, and what is probably the largest colony of the Chiltern gentian in England.

The quarry has one of the most important assemblages of insect species in Bedfordshire, including sixteen species of dragonfly and damselfly, and twenty-one of butterfly, including the uncommon Adonis blue. The odontids include the scarce blue-tailed damselfly and the ruddy darter dragonfly, both of which are scarce in Britain, and the emerald damselfly and the red-eyed damselfly, which are uncommon in Bedfordshire. There are a number of uncommon beetles including Apion astragali, the larvae of which feed solely on the wild licorice, itself a scarce plant in Britain. There are also amphibians, with the common frog, smooth newt and great crested newt regularly breeding here.

The Chiltern Way passes through the site on a footpath from Church Road.
