= Devon Railway Centre =

Railway museum in Bickleigh, Devon, UK

Coordinates: 50°51′28″N 3°30′36″W

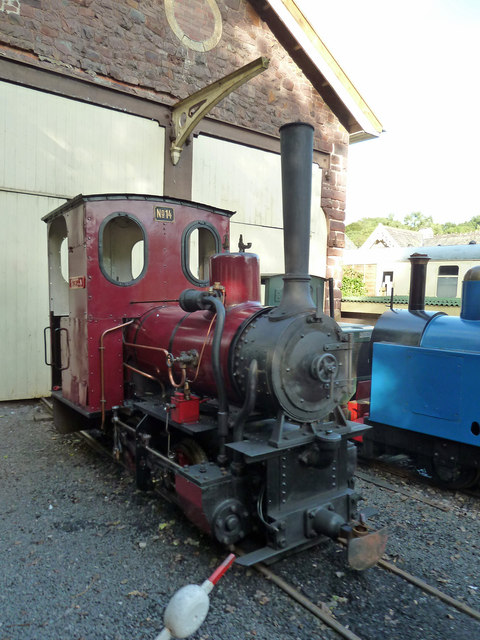
Devon Railway Centre No. 14, an Orenstein & Koppel 0-4-0 well tank steam locomotive built in 1912

The Devon Railway Centre is in the village of Bickleigh in Mid Devon, England, at the former Cadeleigh railway station on the closed Great Western Railway branch from Exeter to Dulverton, also known as the Exe Valley Railway. The centre operates a 2 ft (610 mm) narrow gauge passenger railway and has the largest narrow gauge collection in the South West. There is also a 7 1/4 in (184 mm) gauge miniature railway and a model railway at the centre. The original Victorian station has been restored.
