= List of rolling stock of the Darjeeling Himalayan Railway =

As of 2022 the Darjeeling Himalayan Railway in West Bengal, India, had approximately one hundred pieces of rolling stock. These include several of the narrow-gauge locomotives of India within the Northeast Frontier Railway zone. As of 2017, six out of thirteen remaining steam locomotives were operation. Starting in 2017, it was planned to start producing new replacement parts and to stop the process of the cannibalism that had been used to keep the remaining steam engines going.

== Locomotives ==
=== Steam ===
Number	Type	Names	Built	Builder	Notes
	Steam	Baby Sivok	1881 or 1917	Orenstein & Koppel or Sharp, Stewart and Company	hauled Jawaharlal Nehru at Indian Railway Centenary in 1952 or 1953; plinthed at Siliguri Junction railway station (1957 or 1973; ‒1999); cosmetically restored (1999); Ghum Railway Museum, Ghum railway station (2000‒);
01	B Class	Tindharia			
777	B Class	18 B	1881		Works #3517; DHR No. 18; rebuilt at Tindharia (1917), withdrawn (1957), cosmetically restored (2014); National Rail Museum, New Delhi
778	B Class	19 B	1889	Sharp, Stewart and Company	Works #3518; DHR No.19. Rebuilt at Tindharia Works (1908). Overhauled (1956). Withdrawn (30 September 1960). Purchased by Elliot Donnelley (1962) for Ampersand, Reset and South Eastern Railroad, Lake Forest, Illinois, US. Relocated to Hesston Steam Museum, US (1967; 1982‒). Damaged by fire (26 May 1985), restored (1985), retired (1988). Purchased by Adrian Shooter (2002). Arrived at Tyseley Locomotive Works (19 January 2003‒). Rebuilt with tender and railway air brakes (2003). Beeches Light Railway, England (2004‒2023). Purchased by Darjeeling Tank Locomotive Trust (21 June 2023). Relocated to Statfold Barn Railway, England (2023‒). Planned overhaul (2024).
779	B Class	Himalayan Bird			Eagles on cylinders
780	B Class	Wanderer	1892	Sharp, Stewart and Company	Re-built (2010) at Golden Rock Railway Workshop
781	B Class		1899	Sharp, Stewart and Company	Sold to North Eastern Coalfields, Tipong Colliery (1968). Donated by Coal India and plinthed at Railway Heritage Park, Tinsukia, Assam (2010‒) on top of two Assam Bengal Railway bridge pillars from 1898.
782	B Class	~~Mountaineer~~			
783	B Class		1900	Sharp, Stewart and Company	Works #4562
785	B Class				Plinthed outside Dehradun railway station
786	B Class	~~Ajax~~; Mountaineer			
787	B Class				Converted to oil-firing (2002); cosmetically converted back; plinthed at Siliguri Junction railway station (2019‒)
788	B Class	Tusker	1913	North British	Works #20144;
791	B Class		1914	North British	Works #23302; spares donor, Siliguri
792	B Class	Hawkeye	1917	Baldwin Locomotive Works	Works #44912
794	B Class		1917	Baldwin Locomotive Works	Transferred to Matheran Hill Railway (2001‒); converted for oil-firing (May 2013); side louvres added; first test run (2018)
795	B Class	Bronco	1919	DHR Tindharia works	
798	B Class	Green Hills	1925 or 1926	North British	Works #23291; Rail Museum, Howrah
802	B Class	Whistle Queen; Victor			
804	B Class	Queen of the Hills; Valiant	1925	North British	Works #23302
805	B Class	Iron Sherpa; Soldat	1925	North British	Works #23300
806	B Class	Queen of Hill			
807	C Class		1914	North British	Works #2064; donated to Nehru Science Centre, Mumbai
808	C Class			North British	plinthed at Maligaon
1001	B Class ~~oil-burner~~	Himrathi	2004	Golden Rock Railway Workshop	without side louvres; converted to coal firing at Tindharia works (2012)
1002	B Class oil-burner	Himanand	2004	Golden Rock Railway Workshop	5 kW electrical generator, oil fuel atomiser, 2,100 L water tank, 900 litre diesel tank; with side louvres; returned to manufacturer

=== Diesel ===
Number	Type	Names	Built	Builder	Notes
600	NDM-6		1997	SAN Engineering and Locomotive	Originally delivered to Matheran Hill Railway
601	NDM-6		1997	SAN Engineering and Locomotive	
602	NDM-6		1997	SAN Engineering and Locomotive	
603	NDM-6	Tridhara	1997	SAN Engineering and Locomotive	Originally delivered to Matheran Hill Railway
604	NDM-6	Maverick	1997	SAN Engineering and Locomotive	
605	NDM-6	Buccaneer	1997	SAN Engineering and Locomotive	
606	NDM-6		2025	NFR, New Bongaigaon/ Tindharia	New Diesel Locomotive
607	NDM-6		2025	NFR, New Bongaigaon/ Tindharia	New Diesel Locomotive
608	NDM-6		2026	NFR, New Bongaigaon/ Tindharia	New Diesel Locomotive

== Passenger and freight ==
Beginning in 2008, the Indian Railways headquarters (Rail Bhavan) mandated that all narrow gauge railways in Indian, should move to a future standardised coach design.

Number	Type	Names	Built	Builder	Notes
11	Carriage	Narsing			
14	Carriage (Saloon)	Everest	1943		curved end, 3 windows, 1 door, 2 windows; 1+1 seating
26	Carriage	Falconhurst	1967/1968	Gorakhpur	1 window, 1 door, 4 windows (widely spaced); two rectangular end windows at one end
27	Carriage I	Rangeet	1967/1968	Gorakhpur	"I Chair Car". 4 windows ^{(square)}, door, 1 window (round); 1 window^{(square)}, door, 4 windows^{(square)} "FCZ-27". Plinthed^{(under cover)} at Railway Heritage Park, Tinsukia, Assam (2010‒).
28	Carriage I	Chomolungma		1967/1968	Gorakhpur narrow window, 1 door, 4 windows (square corners); 4 windows, door, narrow window
71	Carriage II				5 windows^{(vertical sliding)}, door, 4 windows^{(vertical sliding)}
71 A	Carriage I	Lhotse	1968	Mysore	2 windows, central door, 2 windows; end window; curved bodyshell
73	Carriage (Replica)		2004	Boston Lodge	Beeches Light Railway, England; 4 windows, door, 5 windows Purchased by Darjeeling Tank Locomotive Trust (21 June 2023). Relocated to Statfold Barn Railway (2023‒).
75	Carriage I	Kanchanjanga	1967/1968	Gorakhpur	"Deluxe First Class Chair Car"; 4 windows, 1 door, 5 windows; Rail Museum, Howrah
76	Carriage				5 windows, 1 door, 4 windows
78	Carriage I		1967	Gorakhpur	4 tall windows^{(square)}, door, 5 tall windows^{(square)}; 5 tall windows^{(square)}, door, 4 wall windows^{(square)}
79	Carriage II				2 windows, 3 windows, door, 1 window
80	Carriage				5 windows, 1 door, 4 windows
82	Carriage				
85	Carriage II		1968		9 windows^{(sliding vertically)}, door; preserved stock
86 A	Carriage I	Makalu	2001	Mysore	2 windows, door, 2 windows; wide end windows^{(round)}; curved bodyshell
88	Carriage I				Preserved stock
93	Carriage I		1967	Gorakhpur	5 windows, door, 4 windows; Ghum Railway Museum, Ghum railway station; rebuilt 1980s; Preserved stock
100	Carriage	Shivalik			4 windows; door; narrow window
102	Carriage I	Serendip			narrow window^{(round)}, door, 4 windows^{(square)}; 4 windows^{(square)}, door, narrow window^{(round)}
103	Carriage II		1968		Preserved stock (frame only)
104	Carriage I	Tashidelek	1989	Jodhpur, JUDH	narrow window^{(round)}, 4 windows^{(square)}, door; narrow window^{(round, toilet)}, 4 windows^{(round)}, door; at Ghum railway museum (2021)
105	Carriage I	Mark Twain			narrow window^{(round, vertical sliding)}, 4 windows^{(square, spaced out, horizontal sliding)}, door
106	Carriage II	Pandim	1989/1990	Jodhpur	half window (toilet), 4 windows, door; door, 3 windows, gap, door, narrow window; end windows or half window, door, gap, 3 windows, door
107	Carriage I	Simvo			4 windows, door, 1 large window (toilet); 1 window, door, 4 windows
108 A	Carriage I	Nuptse	2001	Mysore	2 windows, central door, 2 windows; curved bodyshell; wide end windows
109	Carriage I	The Frontiers Man			undersize window, 4 windows, door, small gap; "FCZ-109" at bottom left.
110	Carriage II				narrow window^{(round)}, 4 windows^{(round)}, door; preserved stock (without body)
111 A	Carriage I				half window, 4 windows, small gap, door; "FCZ-111" at bottom left.
112	Carriage I		1990		half window (toilet), 4 windows, door; 2+1 seating; luggage in one corner
113	Carriage I		1989/1990	Jodhpur	half window (toilet), 4 windows, door
114	Carriage I	Guicha	1990	Jodhpur	half window, 4 windows, door, slight gap; previously second class (S-114)
115	Carriage II				narrow window, 4 windows, narrow window, door
116	Carriage	Rongbuk	1990; 2000	Mysore	2 narrow windows, door, 3 windows; 3 windows, door (I, Guard), half window, half window (toilet); small end window + wide end window; curved bodyshell; "FR-116A"
117	Carriage I		1991	Jodhpur	undersized window, 4 windows, door
118	Carriage	Aravalli	1991	Jodhpur	?, 4 windows, door
119	Carriage III		1902	DHR Tindharia	2-axle carriage; cost Rs.1907; 16 passengers; length: 4.36 m; Tare: 1381 kg; Retired (1968); restoration (2003) funded by Darjeeling Himalayan Railway Society (DHRS); National Rail Museum, New Delhi
119	Carriage	Khang	1989/1990	Jodhpur	half window^{(round, opaque)}, 4 windows^{(round)}, door^{(round)}
120 A	Carriage I	Teesta			narrow window, 4 windows, door
121	Carriage I	Sandakphu			half window (round, toilet), 4 windows^{(round, horizontal sliding)}, door; 5 windows^{(round, horizontal sliding)}, door
122 A	Carriage I	Sagarmatha	2001	Mysore	2 windows, central door, 2 windows; wide end windows; curved bodyshell
124 RA	Carriage (Inspection)	Himalayan Princess	1917		RA-124; Previously open balcony; 1 door, 8 windows, 1 door; sofa + chairs; rebuilt at Siliguri Junction (2012)
126	Carriage I		2015		half window, 5 windows, small gap, 1 door; inward facing 2+2 seats
127	Carriage				window, door, 4 windows; end windows (thin, large, thin)
128	Carriage I		2015		1 window, gap, 5 windows, door; half window, 5 windows, gap, door
143	Carriage I	Dhaulagiri			narrow window (toilet), 4 windows, door
145	Luggage van				large gap, sliding door, gap, door, small window^{(square)}
146	Carriage II (SLR)	Talung	2000		door^{(rectangular window)}, 3 windows^{(square)}, gap^{(welded shut)}, door, small window^{(rectangular)}; window, door, narrow window (toilet), 3 windows, door; three end windows^{(small, square)}; later first class
147	Luggage van		1967/1968	Gorakhpur	Preserved as heritage stock
148	Carriage II	Tsokha			"II Chair Car". window^{(small, rectangular)}, 4 windows^{(round)}, door. "SCZ 148". Plinthed^{(under cover)} on turntable at Railway Heritage Park, Tinsukia, Assam (2010‒).
149	Carriage (Dining)	Tenzing Norgay	2001		narrow window, door, 4 windows; gap, window, door, 2 windows, gap, window; converted from baggage car in 2001
151	Carriage II (Guard)	Dzongri			2 windows, door, 2 windows, door (Guard), narrow window
152	Luggage van		1967/1968	Gorakhpur	Preserved as heritage stock
153	Carriage II / Luggage van	Phalut			narrow window, door, gap, sliding door, 2 windows, door; door, 2 windows, sliding door, gap, door, narrow window
154	Luggage van				gap, sliding door, gap, door, small window; end window
154	Carriage II	Gorkhey			narrow window, door, gap, 3 windows, door, small window; … door, two windows; likely converted
154	Carriage (Replica)		2004	Boston Lodge	Beeches Light Railway, England; 1 window, door, 6 windows, door, 1 window; end window Purchased by Darjeeling Tank Locomotive Trust (21 June 2023). Relocated to Statfold Barn Railway (2023‒).
155	Carriage II	Bakhim	1967		half window, door, 2 windows, gap, door, 2 windows
157 A	Carriage (Brake)		1967		narrow window^{(square, vertical sliding)}, door, gap, 3 windows^{(round, horizontal sliding)}, door; door, 3 windows^{(round, horizontal sliding)}, gap, door, window^{(square)}; three end windows^{(square)}; "FR-157"
158 A	Carriage (Brake)	Khumbu	2001	Mysore	3 windows, door, 2 narrow windows (toilet); wide end window, small end window; curved bodyshell
160	Carriage I		2000	Kalka	narrow window^{(round, toilet, opaque)}, door, 4 windows^{(square, horizontal sliding)}
162	Carriage I			Kalka	4 windows, door, narrow window^{(toilet)}
163	Carriage I		200x	Kalka	4 windows^{(square, horizontal sliding, large frames)}, door, narrow window^{(round, vertical sliding, toilet on one side)}; 2+1 seating
164	Carriage		2000/2003	Kalka	
362	Carriage II	Nilgiri			4 windows, door, narrow window (curved, toilet); narrow window^{(round)}, door, 4 windows^{(square, spaced out)}
363	Carriage II	Nunkun			4 windows, door, narrow window (toilet)
364	Carriage II	Zanskar			half window, door, 4 windows
372	Steel van		1943		double doors; red oxide; Ghum Railway museum
551	Steel van		1940		double doors; red oxide; 2238 kg
553	Steel van		1940		double doors; red oxide; Ghum Railway museum
576	Steel van		1943		double doors; red oxide; 2238 kg; derailed (2018)
583	Steel van		1943		Preserved stock
586	Steel van		1943		double doors; red oxide; Ghum Railway museum
589	Steel van		1943		double doors; red oxide; 2485 kg; preserved stock
601	Steel van				Preserved stock
0601 A	Carriage II				undersized window, 5 windows, small gap, door
0602 A	Carriage II	2007			undersized window, small gap, 5 windows, door; all-over advertising (2022‒)
0603 A	Carriage II				narrow window, small gap, 5 windows, door
604	Carriage I				half window, 5 windows, small gap, door
~~605 A~~	Carriage II				half window, small gap, 5 windows, door
605	Parcel van		2007‒2016	Kurduvadi Workshop	rebuilt as Parcel van (windows welded up)
668	Flat wagon (BKU)		1928		Preserved stock
675	Flat wagon (BKU)		1943		Preserved stock; Ghum railway museum (2021)
0801	Carriage				
0802 A	Carriage (Guard)				door, 2 windows, narrow window, gap, door (Guard), narrow window
803	Carriage I		2007‒2016	Kurduvadi Workshop	half window, 5 windows, door; micro window, 5 windows, small gap, door
0804	Carriage				narrow window, door, gap, narrow window, gap, window, door, window
805	Carriage I		2009	Kurduvadi Workshop	
806	Carriage I			Kurduvadi Workshop	narrow window, gap, 2 windows, tiny gap, 3 windows, door; micro window^{(round)}, 5 windows^{(square)}, door^{(round)}; in stub siding at Darjeeling
0807	Carriage I (AC)		2007‒2016	Kurduvadi Workshop	half window, 4 windows, door; toilet
0808	Carriage II				door, 2 windows, narrow window, door, narrow window; previously with inter-carriage gangway (2016)
0810 A	Carriage II		2007‒2016	Kurduvadi Workshop	narrow window, door, medium gap, narrow window, 2 windows (spaced out), door
0903 A	Carriage I				narrow window (toilet), gap, 5 windows, door; one window replaced with billboard
904	Carriage I		2007‒2016	Kurduvadi Workshop	narrow window, gap, 5 windows, door
0905	Carriage I		2011	Kurduvadi Workshop	half window, 5 windows, small gap, door; all-over advertising (2022‒)
0906 A	Carriage I		2012	Kurduvadi Workshop	half window, 4 windows, door; end windows
0907	Carriage I		2009	Kurduvadi Workshop	narrow window, 5 windows, gap, door; doors diagonally opposite; upgraded to Vistadome roof
908	Carriage I				narrow window^{(square, toilet)}, small gap, 5 windows^{(square, horizontal sliding)}, door^{(round)}; former end gangway removed
919	Flat wagon (BKU)		1943		Preserved stock
921	Carriage I		2015		Vistadome (glass roof); 1 window, 5 windows, 1 door; end windows; all-over advertising (2022‒)
922	Carriage I				Vistadome (glass roof); 1 window, 5 windows, 1 door; end windows
923	Carriage I		2015	Kurduvadi Workshop	Vistadome (glass roof); 1 window, 5 windows, 1 door; 2+2 seating; window both ends; brake; doors diagonally opposite.
924	Carriage			Kurduvadi Workshop	5.5 windows, door; end windows; all-over advertising (2022‒)
925	Carriage (AC)		2015	Kurduvadi Workshop	half window (air con), 5 windows, door
927	Carriage (AC)		2015	Kurduvadi Workshop	half window (air con), 5 windows, door; derail (2018)
967	BC		1915		Preserved stock
994	BC		1915		Preserved stock
1906	Carriage		2009	Kurduvadi Workshop	half window, gap, 5 windows, door
1907	Carriage (AC)			Kurduvadi Workshop	narrow window^{(square, vent)}, 5 windows^{(sealed)}, door^{(round)}
1908	Carriage (Dining)			Kurduvadi Workshop	Vistadome, dining + bar; narrow window, 3 windows, door, window;
WT	Water tank		1928		Preserved stock; Ghum railway museum, Ghum railway station
	Trolley				Gravity trolley with bench + parasol; towed up hill
