= Adrian Shooter =

British transport executive (1948–2022)

Adrian Shooter CBE FREng FIMechE FCILT
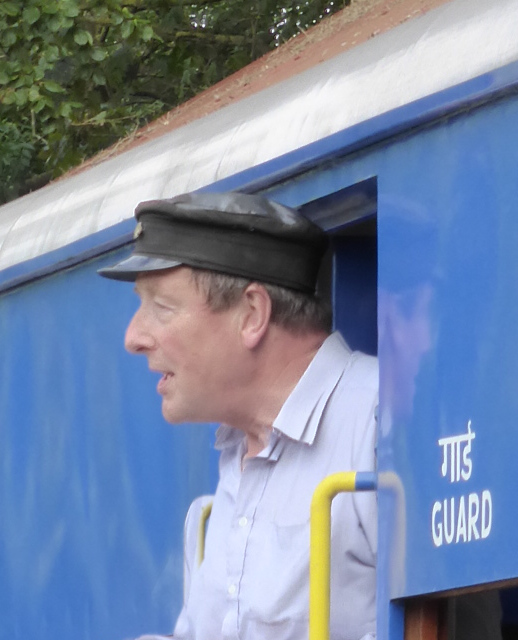
- Shooter in 2014
- Born: 22 November 1948; London, England
- Died: 13 December 2022 (aged 74); Switzerland
- Occupations: Chair: SLC Rail; Chair: Vivarail; Chair: Chiltern Railways; Chair: DB Regio UK; Chair: ATOC; Chair: RSSB; President: Darjeeling Himalayan Railway Society; Director: Ffestiniog Railway Society
- Years active: 1970–2022
- Spouses: Diana Crombie (m. 1970; div. 2002) Barbara Harding (m. 2006)
- Parents: Reginald Arthur Shooter (father); Jean Shooter (mother)

Adrian Shooter CBE FREng FIMechE FCILT (22 November 1948 – 13 December 2022) was a British transport executive.

He is best known for leading the newly privatised Chiltern Railways between 1996 and 2011, and for founding the Vivarail engineering company in 2012. A lifelong railway enthusiast, he had many other involvements with railways, both commercial and preserved, including the Ffestiniog Railway, the Darjeeling Himalayan Railway and his own Beeches Light Railway.

== Early life ==
Adrian Shooter was born on 22 November 1948 in London. His father was Reginald Arthur Shooter, a microbiologist and Fellow of the Royal College of Surgeons, best known for chairing the inquiry into the 1978 smallpox outbreak in the United Kingdom. His mother was Jean Shooter (née Wallace), who was also a doctor. The two had met whilst serving in the Royal Navy during the Second World War.

Shooter was educated at Kingswood House School and Epsom College. Having failed his mathematics A-level, he lost his accepted place at the University of Leeds and instead studied mechanical engineering at North Staffordshire Polytechnic.

== Career ==
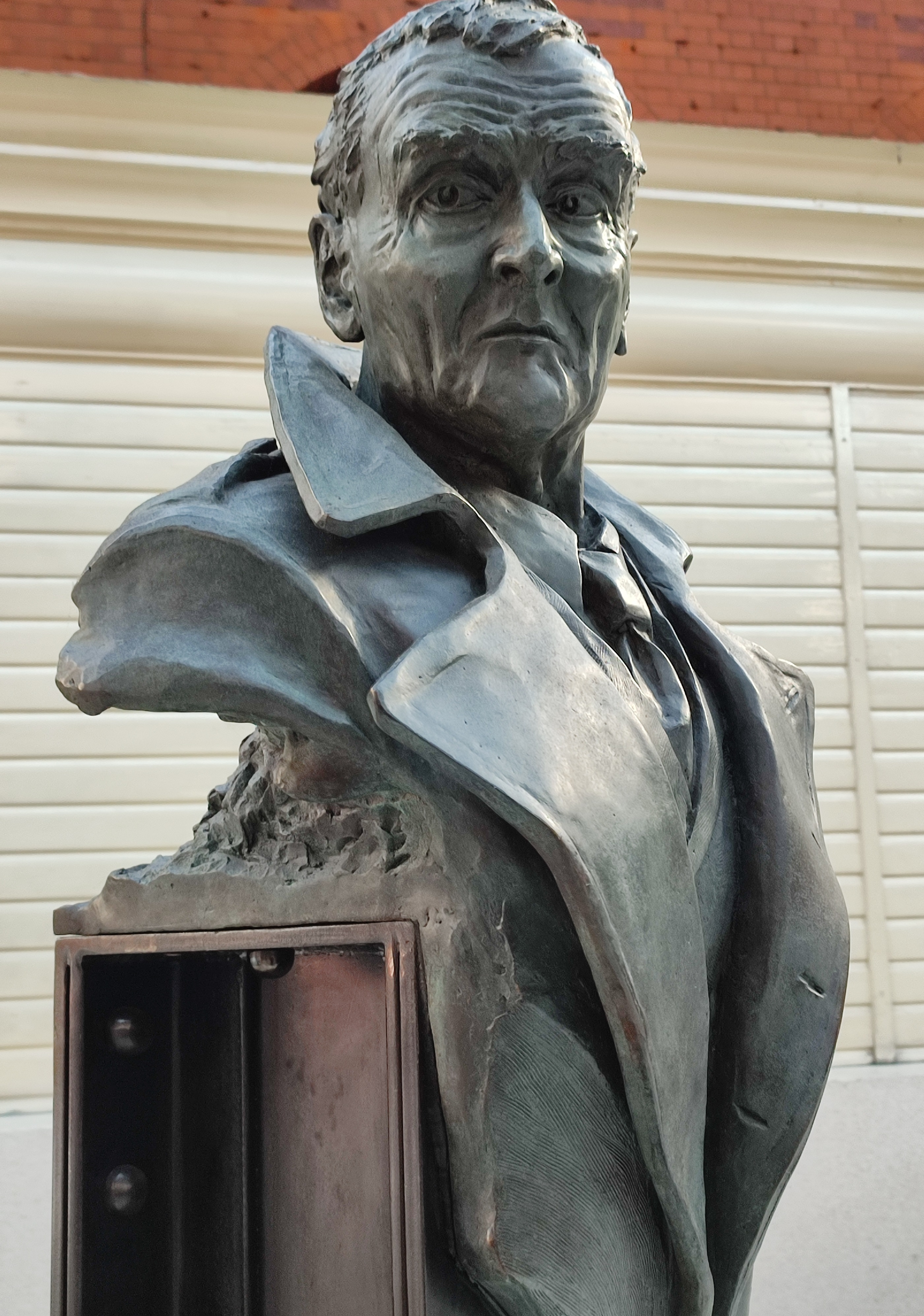
Adrian Shooter bust beside platform 1 at Marylebone station

Shooter joined British Rail in 1970 as a management trainee. By mid-1974 Shooter was a mechanical engineer. He became maintenance engineer at Bletchley Depot in the mid-1970s, then depot manager at Heaton Depot, before moving to Carlisle as area maintenance engineer.

He worked on expansion projects at Bournemouth Depot and Selhurst Depot. He later became area manager at St Pancras railway station. By 1988, Shooter was the business manager involved in establishment of Red Star Parcels and Rail Express Systems, before joining Chiltern Railways in April 1994.

During the privatisation of British Rail, he headed up the M40 Trains management buyout consortium that was awarded the Chiltern Railways franchise. Shooter was the first managing director of that franchise in 1996, and went on to become its chairman. In early 1999, three managers of Chiltern Railways, Shooter, Alex Turner and Owen Edgington, sold their controlling stakes in Chiltern to John Laing Group for £1.5 million. With the acquisition of John Laing by Deutsche Bahn in 2008, he became chairman of DB Regio UK. He retired from this role in December 2011.

Shooter had introduced the use of driving simulators for training Chiltern Railways' train drivers. During his time at Chiltern he is credited with the doubling of its passenger numbers through innovation and investment in the ambitious development of train services and infrastructure, and overseeing "the strongest growth record of any rail business in Europe". In November 2016 Shooter delivered the annual railway lecture to the Institution of Engineering and Technology on "Innovation and Realism". Shooter was a director of the Association of Train Operating Companies (ATOC) between 2001 and 2011. He chaired the organisation in 2007.

Shooter was a fellow of the Royal Academy of Engineering, the Institution of Mechanical Engineers and of the Chartered Institute of Transport. He was chairman of the West Midlands and Oxfordshire region of the Confederation of British Industry, chairman of Bicester Vision, director of Wabtec, and was chair of the Oxfordshire Local Enterprise Partnership for three-and-a-half years until late-2015. In mid-2011, Shooter had joined the advisory board of the National Railway Museum.

In 2012, Shooter founded Vivarail, a company purchasing London Underground D78 Stock and rebuilding them into the Vivarail D-Train family, including diesel class 230s and third-rail electric class 484s. During the 2021 United Nations Climate Change Conference (COP26) short demonstration trips with a prototype pure-battery D-Train were organised from Glasgow Central station with Shooter and Henry Posner III of Railroad Development Corporation (RDC) on board.

In 2013 Shooter became chairman of Churnet Valley Railway, and a vice-president of Railfuture along with Andrew Adonis, Chris Green, Roger Ford and Barry Doe. Shooter was a director of Vintage Trains from 2018 until 2020.

== Recognition ==
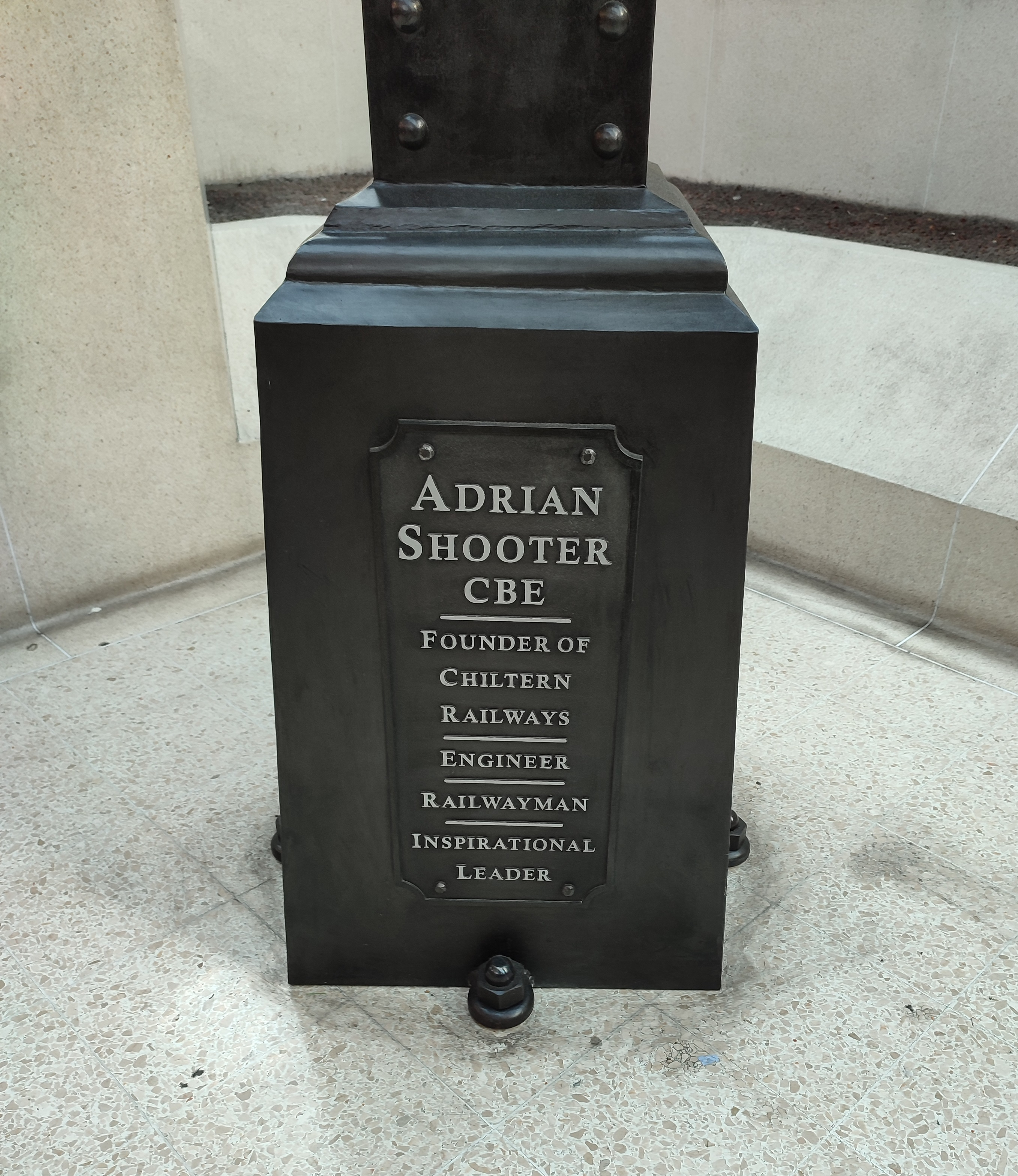
The plinth at Marylebone

During 2002, Adrian Shooter received an honorary doctorate (DUniv) from Staffordshire University. the successor body to North Staffordshire Polytechnic. A decade later, in 2013, he received an additional honorary doctorate (DUniv), this time from the University of Birmingham. In 2005 he was elected a Fellow of the Royal Academy of Engineering (FREng).

In the 2010 New Year Honours list, Shooter was appointed a Commander of the Order of the British Empire (CBE) "for services to the rail industry". In June 2019 Shooter was recipient of the chairman's award of the Institute of Directors West Midlands branch. On 16 September 2021, Shooter received the lifetime achievement award at the Rail National Railway Awards.

On 30 August 2022, a 2.7-metre (9 ft) bronze statue with a bust of Shooter created by Luke Perry and crowd-funded by rail industry leaders and close associates, was unveiled beside platform 1 at Marylebone station in London. The bust sits on top of a girder and plinth and is secured to the ground using railway-inspired loops and bolts. At the same time, Class 168 Clubman unit 168001, the very first train ordered by Chiltern Railways, and the first new train in the UK ordered following the privatisation of British Rail, was named Adrian Shooter CBE.

On 23 November 2022, Shooter was awarded the Japanese Foreign Minister's commendation by Hayashi Hajime, Japanese ambassador to the United Kingdom, for work on rail safety and establishing the UK–Japan Railways exchange programme in 1993.

== Personal life ==
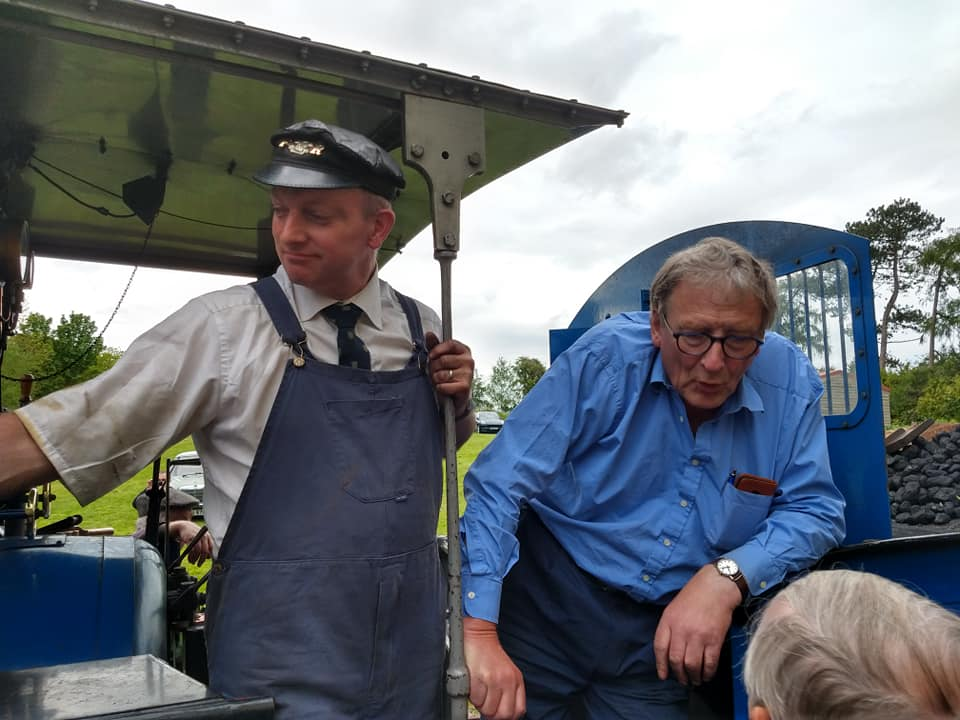
Adrian Shooter (right) with Jeremy Davey (left) onboard locomotive No.19 (DHR 778) at Beeches Light Railway in 2019.

Shooter married his first wife, Diana Crombie, in 1970 and they had a son and a daughter together. The marriage was dissolved in 2002, and in 2006 he married Barbara Harding.

Besides his professional interest in railways, Shooter also owned the Darjeeling Himalayan Railway Class 'B' steam locomotive 778 (originally No. 19), which he operated on the Beeches Light Railway in the grounds of his residence in Oxfordshire. He also commissioned carriages to accompany the locomotive from the Ffestiniog Railway's Boston Lodge works, together with a replica Sandy River and Rangeley Lakes Railroad 'Model T' inspection locomotive commissioned from the Statfold Barn Railway.

Shooter was chairman of the Model 'A' Ford Club of Great Britain. In 2014 his Model 'A' suffered a seized bearing during a classic rally race in Myanmar. He also owned an Indian Hindustan Ambassador car. In April 2022, Adrian and Barbara Shooter welcomed two refugees into their home during the 2022 Ukrainian refugee crisis with Barbara Shooter driving to the Polish border to collect them and drop off emergency supplies.

By early 2022, Shooter had been diagnosed with motor neuron disease but planned to continue driving his Darjeeling steam locomotive for as long as possible. In March, he visited Siliguri and Darjeeling in India in his role of president of the UK-based Darjeeling Himalayan Railway Society.

Adrian Shooter died on 13 December 2022, at age 74. In a statement written by him and released by his wife after his death, he described how his symptoms had rapidly worsened, and said that "by the time you read this I shall have gone peacefully to sleep in a clinic in Switzerland". Vivarail had entered administration almost a fortnight earlier. By late-December 2022 Shooter's memorial service had been planned to be held near Henley-on-Thames on 7 January 2023 at the Fawley Hill Railway museum, created by the late Sir William McAlpine.
