= Beeches Light Railway =

Former narrow-gauge railway in England

Coordinates: 51.92374°N 1.308797°W

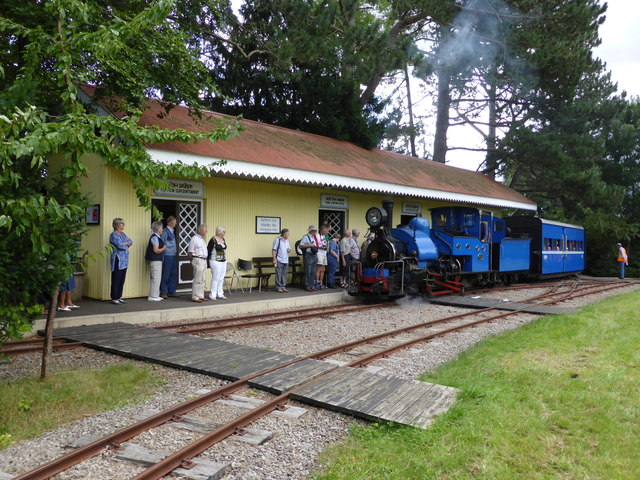
The Beeches Light Railway at Ringkingpong Station

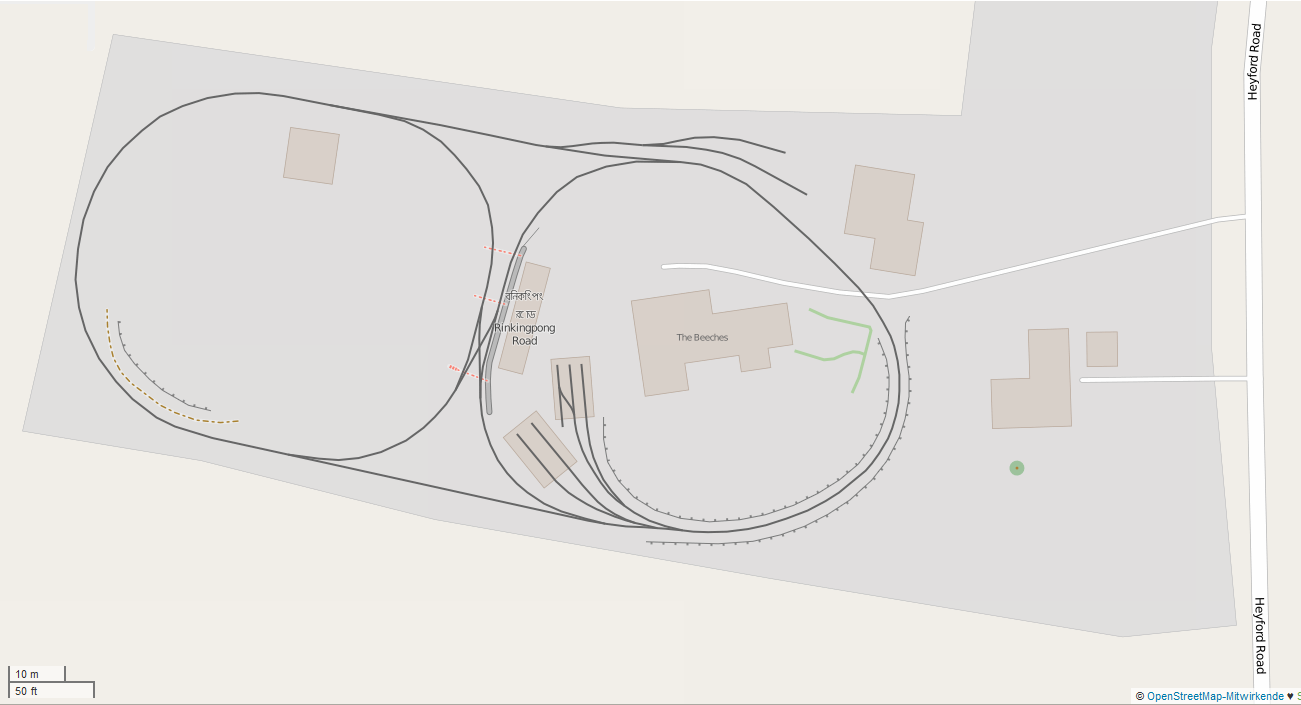
Map of Beeches Light Railway

The Beeches Light Railway was a private narrow gauge railway in Steeple Aston, Oxfordshire, England, in the garden of Adrian Shooter. The line contained one station, Rinkingpong Road (Bengali: রিনকিংপং রোড) at an elevation of 351 feet (107 m) above sea level.

== History ==
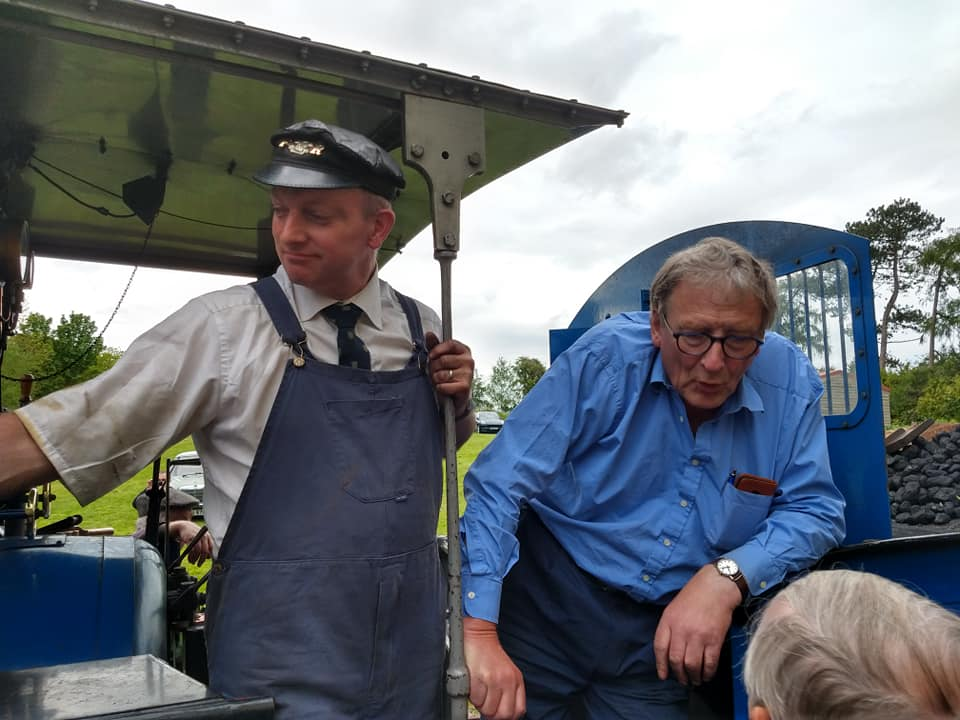
Adrian Shooter (driver, right) with Jeremy Davey (fireman, left) onboard locomotive No.19 at Beeches in 2019.

In 2019, Shooter announced that the Beeches Light Railway would close at the end of the year. It was planned to move the railway to a new, larger location, reopening in spring 2020. As of December 2022 the railway remained in situ, but was dismantled in the months following, after Adrian Shooter's death. The house, including the station building and sheds were put up for sale in 2023.

== Track ==
The nearly 1 mile (1.6 km) railway track with a gauge of 2 ft (610 mm) was built between 2002 and 2004. It resembled a figure of eight, with a loop around the back garden and another around the front, where it crossed the main drive. An Indian-style railway station and sheds were behind the house. The theme of an Indian railway was present throughout, including the name of the station ("Ringkingpong Road Station"), fare evasion signs citing Indian rupees, and some interior decorations as well. Although the railway was private, and not subject to rail regulations, it was run professionally by Shooter and experienced volunteers with railway rulebooks and regulations, and the steam engine had to be certified each year.

== Rolling stock ==
=== Steam locomotive ===
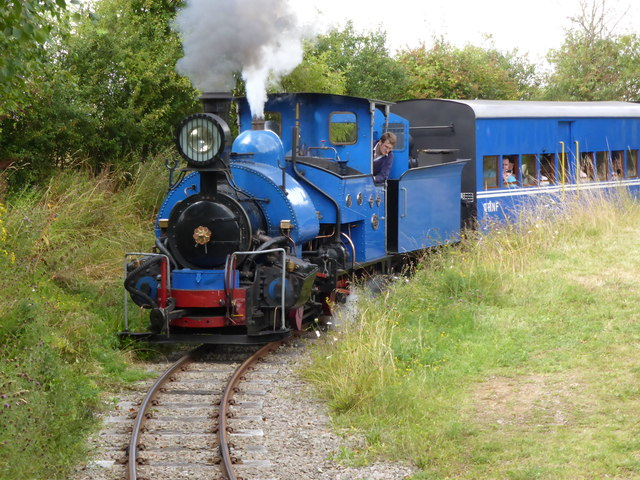
Steam locomotive 778

The railway's primary motive power, a DHR B Class No. 778, was built by Sharp, Stewart & Company in 1888, works number 3518. 778 was built for India's Darjeeling Himalayan Railway. where it ran until either 1960 or 1962, when it was sold to Elliot Donnelley, a railway enthusiast in the US, who was the major shareholder in RR Donnelley Co, a large printer and publisher in Chicago. After Donnelley died in 1975 the locomotive passed to the Hesston Steam Museum, where it stayed until it was bought by Adrian Shooter in 2002 and restored to working order.

=== Carriages ===
Two modern replicas of the carriages used on the Darjeeling Himalayan Railway were occasionally used to transport invited guests. These carriages were commissioned from Boston Lodge works, to accompany the locomotive.

=== Draisine ===
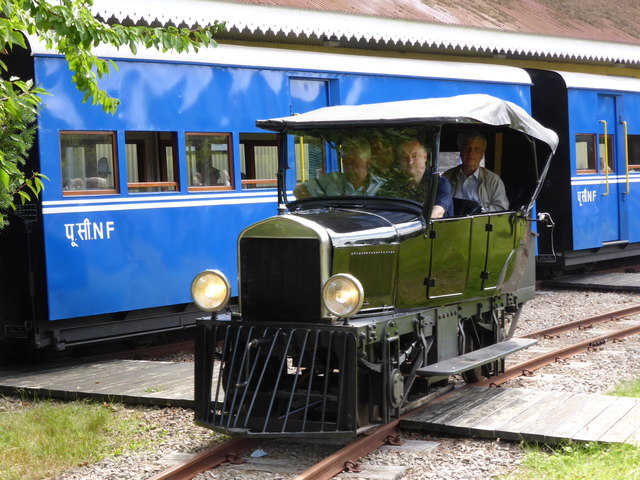
Adrian Shooter's draisine of the type 'Ford Model T' on the Beeches Light Railway

Shooter owned also a replica Ford Model-T motorcar that he ran on the tracks. It is based on a modified car used by the USA railway to inspect tracks on the Sandy River and Rangeley Lakes Railroad. The replica was commissioned from the Statfold Barn Railway. It includes a jacking system that will lift the wheels free of the rails and allow it to be rotated on its axis in order to go the other way round.

=== Additional rolling stock ===
Stored in the railway shed there was some rolling stock from the London Mail Rail, an underground goods railway line, which was used to transport letters and parcels between sorting depots before it was mothballed.

=== Visiting locomotives ===
On 1 July 2018 the Darjeeling Himalayan Railway Society celebrated its twentieth anniversary at the line. Two visiting locomotives were in steam: W. G. Bagnall 0-4-0ST Woto, and Baguley 0-4-0T Rishra (formerly of a Kolkata (Calcutta) water works in India).

=== List of former rolling stock ===
Number	Type	Names	Built	Builder	Notes
19 B	B Class	DHR 778	1889	Sharp, Stewart & Company	Works #3518; DHR No.19. Rebuilt at Tindharia Works (1908). Overhauled (1956). Withdrawn (30 September 1960). Purchased by Elliot Donnelley (1962) for Ampersand, Reset and South Eastern Railroad, Lake Forest, Illinois, US. Relocated to Hesston Steam Museum, US (1967; 1982‒). Damaged by fire (26 May 1985), restored (1985), retired (1988). Purchased by Adrian Shooter (2002). Arrived at Tyseley Locomotive Works (19 January 2003‒). Rebuilt with tender and railway air brakes (2003). Beeches Light Railway, England (2004‒2023). Purchased by Darjeeling Tank Locomotive Trust (21 June 2023). Relocated to Statfold Barn Railway, England (2023‒). Planned overhaul (2024).
73	Carriage (Replica)		2004	Boston Lodge	Beeches Light Railway, England; 4 windows, door, 5 windows Purchased by Darjeeling Tank Locomotive Trust (21 June 2023). Relocated to Statfold Barn Railway (2023‒).
154	Carriage (Replica)		2004	Boston Lodge	Beeches Light Railway, England; 1 window, door, 6 windows, door, 1 window; end window Purchased by Darjeeling Tank Locomotive Trust (21 June 2023). Relocated to Statfold Barn Railway (2023‒).
	Parlor Car (Replica)	Carrabasset	2004	Boston Lodge	Delivered 2005. Modelled on Sandy River & Rangeley Lakes Parlor Car #9 Rangeley. Sold to Statfold Barn Railway (2022‒)
	Diesel-Hydraulic	Col. Frederick Wylie	1994	Hunslet Engine Company	Works #9349. Originally Stacy. Rebuilt by Alan Keef Ltd (2004). Sold to Ffestiniog Railway (2023‒), renamed Mol yr Hudd
37	Mail Rail		1930	English Electric	Works #760. Originally Post Office red, repainted green.
44	Mail Rail		1930	English Electric	Works #812. Motor bogies only
	Diesel locomotive	Major Gerald Scott	1957	Motor Rail	Works #21619. Painted same green as Mail Rail No. 37 Formerly at Solway Moss peat works. Subsequently at Bressingham Steam and Gardens (2023‒)
	Diesel locomotive		1930	Robert Hudson	Works #38384
	Scindia State Railway (Replica)				Replica carriage with observation deck. Little Braxted Bakery railway (2023‒). Refitted for Pullman dining (2024‒).
	RNAD Van (Generator)		1942	Cravens	Painted in Darjeeling blue. Generator van for Carrabassett kitchen + carriages. Purchased by Statfold Barn Railway (2023‒).
	Ford Model T rail car		2008	Statfold Barn Railway	Works #9901 (Hunslet) Vale of Rheidol Railway Museum, Wales (2024—)
	Brake van			Robert Hudson	Gray, with "BLS" in white text.
	Flat wagon			Cravens	Painted black
	4-Plank wagon			Cravens	Darjeeling red.
	RNAD Van			Cravens	Darjeeling red.
	RNAD Van	V2		Cravens	Darjeeling red.
	Flat wagon	FL2		Cravens	Darjeeling red.

== Closure ==
As of March 2023, after Adrian Shooter's death, the 1 mile (1.6 km) of track, plus rolling stock from the railway were auctioned for sale in June 2023. The winning bid for 778 was by The Darjeeling Tank Locomotive Trust, which had managed to buy both 778 and the two replica coaches, relocating the rolling stock to a new base at Statfold Country Park.
