= Reginald Arthur Shooter =

British microbiologist (1916–2013)

R. A. Shooter
- Born: Reginald Arthur Shooter; 4 April 1916; Bradford, West Riding of Yorkshire, England
- Died: 24 December 2013 (aged 97)
- Education: Gonville and Caius College, Cambridge; St Bartholomew's Hospital Medical College
- Children: Adrian Shooter

Reginald Arthur Shooter (4 April 1916 – 24 December 2013) was a British microbiologist. He led the official inquiry into the 1978 smallpox outbreak in the United Kingdom and was appointed a CBE in the 1980 Birthday Honours. He retired in 1981.

Reginald Shooter's oldest child, and only son, was Adrian Shooter, the railway manager best known for leading Chiltern Railways after the privatisation of British Rail and for forming the Vivarail engineering company.
