= Ryam Sugar Factory Railway =

Sugar company in Bihar, India

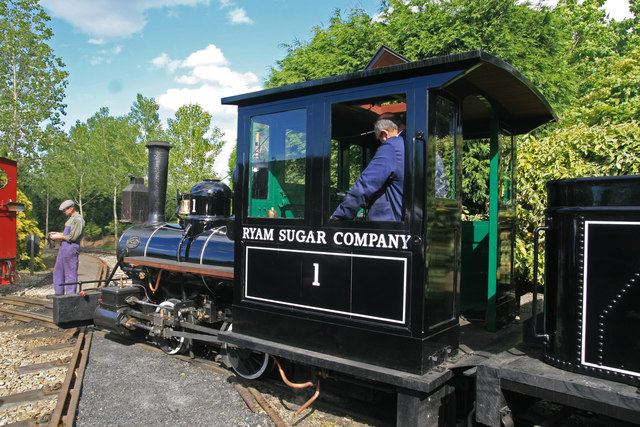
Locomotive No 1 is now fully restored and operational at Statfold Barn Railway in England.

The Ryam Sugar Factory Railway was owned and operated by the Ryam Sugar Factory in Bihar, India.

== History ==
The Ryam Sugar Factory was incorporated in 1914 as the Tirhut Co-operative Sugar Co Ltd. It was located in a town now known as Raiyam (मैथिली) 15 km north-east of Darbhanga. The factory had two 2 ft (610 mm) narrow gauge railway lines operating as a field system, to bring cane into the factory:

- Line to Mokaddampur, 14 km long, which remained in use until its closure in 1994.
- Line to Sakri, 10 km long, a station on the 'Darbhanga-Bhaptiahi Branch Line' of the Bengal Nagpur Railway (BNR). This line was closed significantly earlier than the other line.

== Stationary steam engines ==
In No. 1 Mill stationary steam engine #2619 (1932) by Mirrlees, Watson was used (single cylinder, 24” x 48”, 273 hp, Corliss valves, cost Rs 16000 new). A Nos 2, 3 and 4 Mills stationary steam engine #2423 (1914) by Mirrlees, Watson was installed (single cylinder, 300 hp, piston valves, cost Rs 15000 new).

== Locomotives ==
Identity	Works Number	Type	Gauge	Builder	Year built	Current Operator	Status	Notes	Image
779	44657	4-6-0PT	2 ft (610 mm)	Baldwin	1916	Statfold Barn Railway near Tamworth, Staffordshire.	Awaiting restoration		
608	45190	4-6-0PT	2 ft (610 mm)	Baldwin	1917	Ffestiniog Railway	In Service		
No 1	1586	0-4-0	2 ft (610 mm)	Davenport	1917	Statfold Barn Railway	Operational	Restored to working order in 2015.	
ALPHA	1172	0-6-0PT	2 ft (610 mm)	Hudswell Clarke	1922	Statfold Barn Railway	Operational	Restored to working order in 2016.	

== Gallery ==
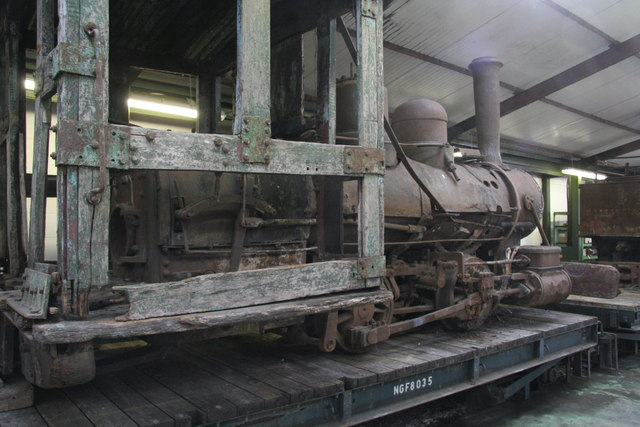
No 1 awaiting restoration

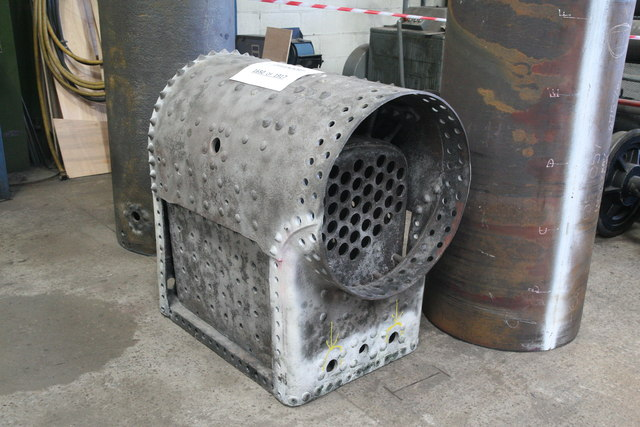
No 1's firebox under repair

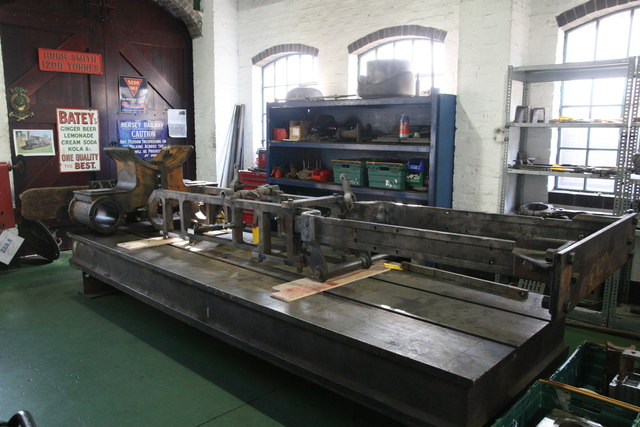
No 1 in the works
