= DHR B Class 778 =

B class steam locomotive

Darjeeling Himalayan Railway 19 (All-India No. 778)
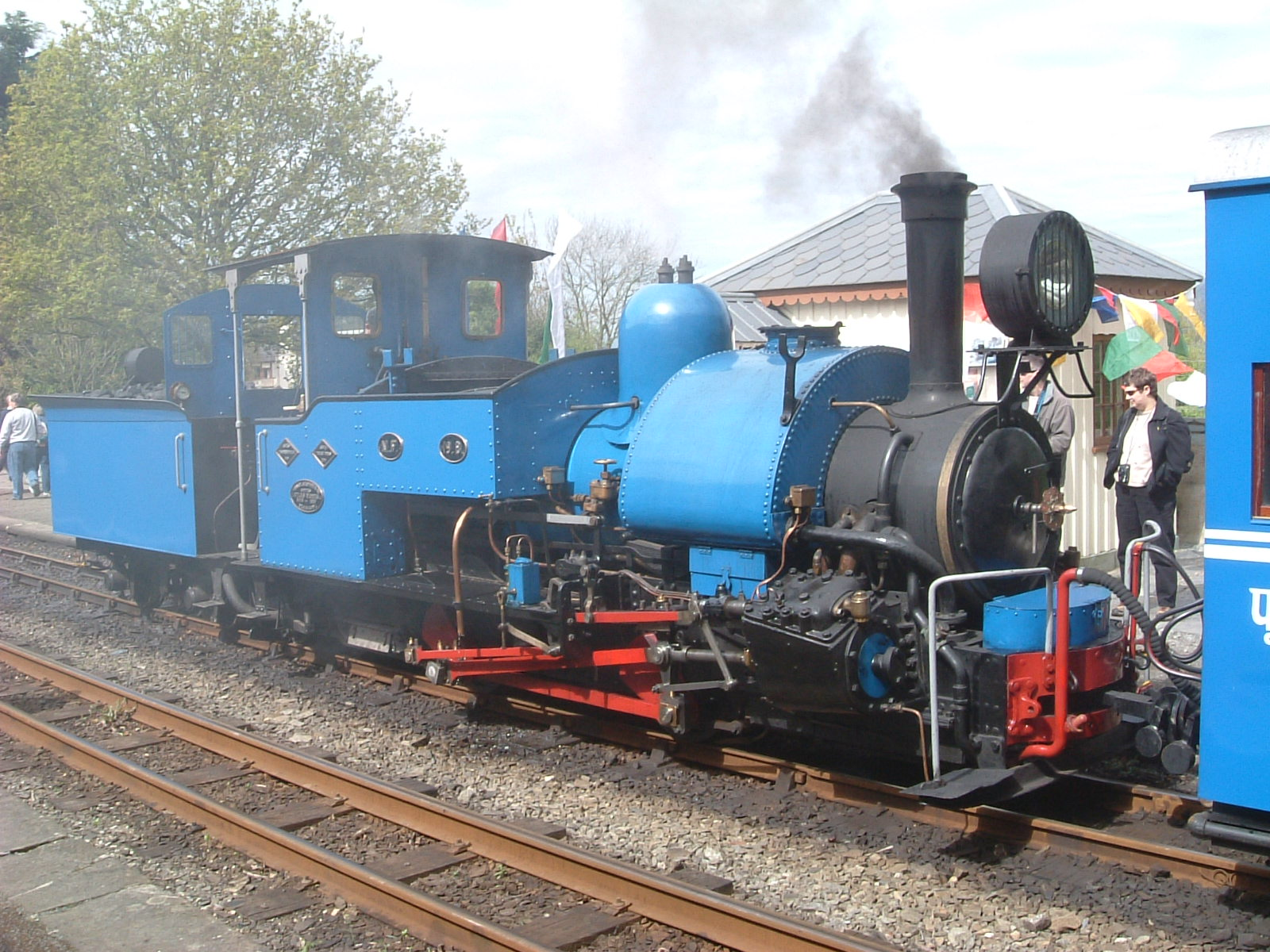
- No. 778 hauling a train on the Ffestiniog Railway
Type and origin
- Power type: Steam
- Builder: Sharp, Stewart & Co.
- Serial number: 3518
- Website: www.darjeelingtank.org.uk
Specifications
- Configuration
  - Whyte: 0-4-0ST
  - UIC: B n2t
- Gauge: 2 ft (610 mm)
- Driver dia.: 26 in (0.660 m)
- Axle load: 7.75 long tons (7.87 t)
- Loco weight: 14 long tons (14 t)
- Fuel type: Coal
- Firebox
  - Grate area: 9 sq ft (0.84 m^{2})
- Boiler pressure: 140 psi (0.97 MPa)
- Heating surface: 316 sq ft (29.4 m^{2})
- Superheater: None
- Cylinders: Two, outside
- Cylinder size: 11 in × 14 in (279 mm × 356 mm)
Performance figures
- Maximum speed: 32 km/h (20 mph)
- Tractive effort: 7,750 lbf (34.47 kN)
Career
- Operators: Darjeeling Himalayan Railway; → Indian Railways
- Class: DHR B Class
- Number in class: 3rd of 34
- Numbers: No. 19 (1889‒1957); No. 778 (1957‒)
- Nicknames: Little Blue
- Locale: Statfold Barn Railway
- Withdrawn: 1960
- Current owner: Darjeeling Tank Locomotive Trust
- Disposition: Under renovation (awaiting new boiler)(Hoped to be back in service by summer 2027)

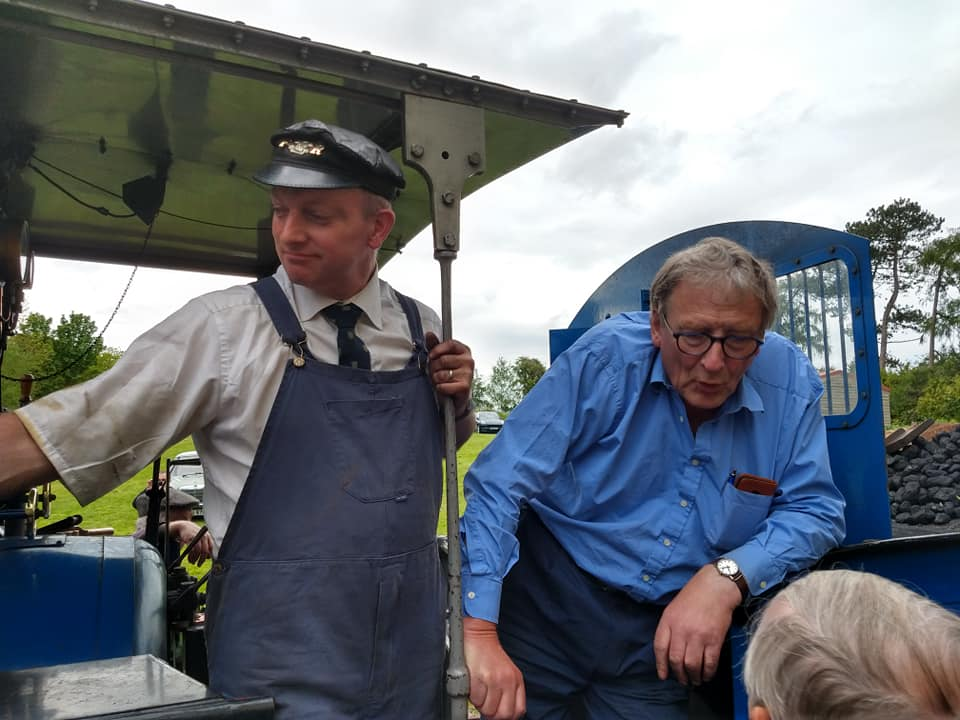
Adrian Shooter (driver, right) with Jeremy Davey (fireman, left) onboard locomotive No.19 at Beeches Light Railway in 2019.

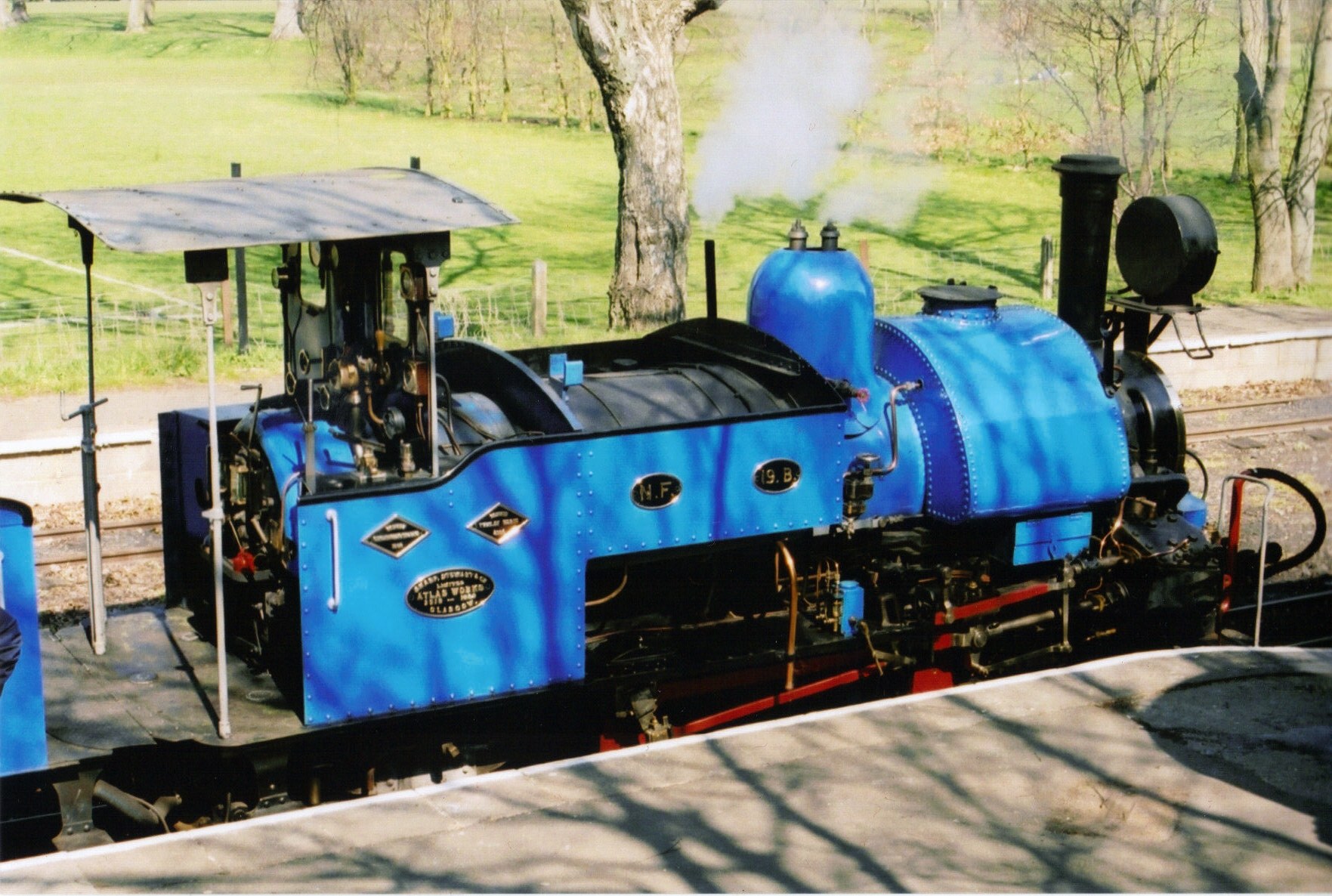
DHR19 in the station at Leighton Buzzard.

DHR 778 (originally number 19) is a narrow-gauge steam locomotive, that was built in 1889 for the Darjeeling Himalayan Railway. It is preserved in the United Kingdom, and is the only DHR locomotive outside of India. The engine currently has the oldest locomotive boiler still in use anywhere in the world. The boiler will be replaced in early 2027.

== History ==
DHR 778 is a 0-4-0ST DHR B Class, a design built between 1889 and 1927. A total of 34 were built. By 2005 only 12 remained in use (or under repair) on the Darjeeling Himalayan Railway. The class was designed by Sharp, Stewart and Company of Glasgow and built by them, their successors the North British Locomotive Company (NBL), and three each by Baldwin Locomotive Works (BLW, Philadelphia, USA), and the DHR works at Tindharia.

Number 778 (originally No.19) was built in 1889 by Sharp Stewart & Co at the Atlas Works in Glasgow. It is the only DHR locomotive outside of India. After many years out of use at the Hesston Steam Museum, it was sold to enthusiast Adrian Shooter in the United Kingdom and restored to working order. It was based on Beeches Light Railway, a private railway in Oxfordshire, and has also run on the Ffestiniog Railway, the Leighton Buzzard Light Railway, the Launceston Steam Railway and the South Tynedale Railway. 778 is the only B class with a tender.

Locomotive No. 19B was based at the Beeches Light Railway until Shooter's death in December 2022. On 21 June 2023, the locomotive was purchased at auction for £250,000 by The Darjeeling Tank Locomotive Trust (DTLT), with supporters raising the required money three months beforehand. Following the sale, the locomotive and its two matching carriages were relocated by the Trust to the Statfold Barn Railway near Tamworth, Staffordshire.

== Special events ==
In mid-2011, for the 40th anniversary of the Froissy Dompierre Light Railway in France, three Britain-based locomotives visited, including locomotive 778.

In 2013, locomotive 778 ran as a part of Indian Extravaganza Fest in Bedfordshire in East England, and in 2014 it was the main attraction at the South Tynedale Railway's Indian Summer Event
