= Statfold Barn Railway =

Railway in England

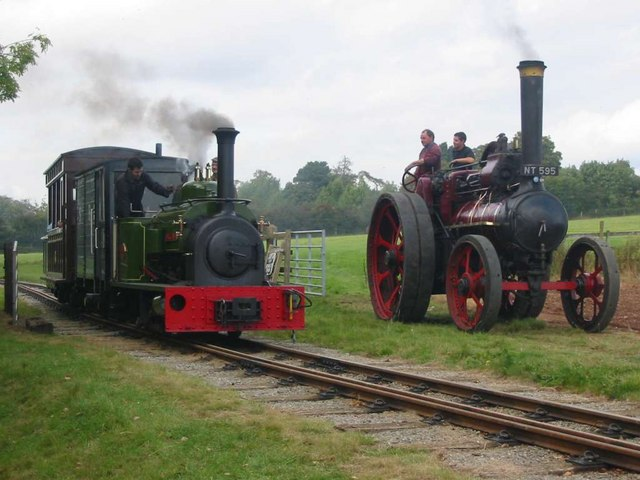
- Locale: Tamworth, Staffordshire
- Terminus: Statfold Barn Farm
- Coordinates: 52.6552°N 1.6454°W

Preserved operations
- Length: 1.5 miles (2.4 km)
- Preserved gauge: 4 ft 8 1/2 in (1,435 mm) standard gauge; 2 ft 6 in (762 mm); 2 ft (610 mm)
- 1985: opened

The Statfold Barn Railway is a narrow gauge railway based near Tamworth, Staffordshire and partially in Warwickshire, England. Founded by engineering entrepreneur Graham Lee and his wife Carol at their farm-based home, they originally designed what is still termed the garden railway, in which Graham could run his trains and Carol could design an extensive English country garden around a lake.

Graham Lee chaired the family-owned LH Group, with its main focus on railway engineering services. After LH Group acquired what remained of the Hunslet Engine Company in 2005, Graham pursued the opportunity to acquire the last steam locomotive built by Hunslet. Commissioned in 1971, it had been ordered by Leeds-based Robert Hudson & Co Ltd, who supplied and installed a complete railway system for the Trangkil sugar mill estate in Indonesia. As he pursued the Hunslet, Graham noticed a number of other interesting but defunct steam locomotives of European origin in Indonesia, and set about recovering these as well.

After Wabtec acquired LH Group in 2012, Graham retained the rights to produce steam locomotives under the Hunslet name. He had produced the first new steam powered Hunslet in 2006, and also restored several locomotives in the collection. In 2017, Graham and Carol Lee gave the collection of over 100 locomotives and associated vehicles, equipment and ephemera to the newly formed Statfold Narrow Gauge Museum Trust, to ensure the collection was retained and maintained at its current site.

Today the railway has an extensive workshop where locomotives are built and restored. The railway is open to the public.

== History ==
Having acquired Statfold Farm near Tamworth, Staffordshire as their family home, engineer Graham Lee – who had worked his way up through family owned LH Group, and eventually became chairman – persuaded his wife Carol to build a 2 ft (610 mm) narrow gauge railway around their garden and lake.

Happy with the garden railway, it was not until LH Group acquired what remained of the Hunslet Engine Company in 2005, that Graham pursued the opportunity to acquire the last steam locomotive built by Hunslet (and the last steam locomotive to be built in the UK for industrial use). Commissioned in 1971 to an original Kerr Stuart design, it had been ordered by Leeds-based Robert Hudson & Co, who supplied and installed a complete railway system for the Trangkil sugar mill estate in Indonesia. Negotiations were conducted via Hunslet's agent in Jakarta, and after visiting the site during negotiations and to supervise the loading of Trangkil No.4, Graham noticed a number of other interesting but defunct steam locomotives of European origin in Indonesia, and set about recovering these as well. Pakis Baru and Sragi sugar mills had interesting locomotive fleets and two examples from German manufacturers were acquired from each.

As Indonesia's state environmental laws do not allow the export of scrap-metal, Trangkil No.4 together with five other locomotives Graham proposed to export back to the UK had to be shown in steam and moving. Whilst Trangkil No.4 was still 2 ft gauge, the other five locomotives were built to the more common European 2 ft 6inches gauge. Graham hence built with friends what is now term the mainline – in dual 2 ft and 2 ft 6 in (762 mm) gauge – which runs around the outside in a basic oval shape of the original garden railway. Thus was formed the Statfold Barn Railway, and its core collection.

After Wabtec acquired LH Group in 2012, Graham retained the rights to produce steam locomotives under the Hunslet name. He had produced the first new steam powered Hunslet in 2006, and used the same facilities to restore items in the collection. In March 2010 some 51 locomotives were based on the Statfold Barn Railway, either operable or waiting for restoration or rebuild.

In 2017, Graham and Carol Lee gave the collection of over 100 locomotives and associated vehicles, equipment and ephemera to the newly formed Statfold Narrow Gauge Trust, to ensure the collection was retained and maintained at its current site. In 2025 Lee was awarded an MBE (Member of the Most Excellent Order of the British Empire) in the King's Birthday Honours List, in recognition of his work within the railway industry and his charitable works over several decades.

Today the railway has its own workshop where locomotives are restored and maintained. The 'Field Railway' is a 2 ft (610 mm) gauge line approximately 1.5 miles (2.4 km) long with a "balloon loop" at one end with a station at the other end, originally with 2 ft 6 in (762 mm) mixed gauge. There is a passing loop halfway along the line which has a single platform 'Oak Tree Halt' and a siding heading off to storage facilities in the 'Grain Store' roundhouse. There is also a separate (but connected) loop line 'Garden Railway' of 2 ft (610 mm) gauge round an ornamental lake. Alongside the core 2 ft and 2 ft 6 inch collection, the museum also displays locomotives of other gauges including 4 ft 8 1/2 in (1,435 mm) standard gauge, 18 in (457 mm) and 2 ft 6 in (762 mm), and other vehicles.

In July 2023 Darjeeling Himalayan Railway (DHR) locomotive 778 was relocated to the Statfold Barn Railway. It is the only DHR locomotive outside of India, and has the oldest currently working steam boiler in the world.

For the 2017 season, a narrow gauge tram track was laid in concrete parallel to the level section of the Field Railway incorporating an 18 in (457 mm) mixed gauge rail line. The running shed had a triple gauge line leading down into the standard gauge storage sidings and then across the Field Railway where a short stub led into a field.

March 2023 saw the opening of a new miniature railway, the 12 1/4 in (311 mm) gauge 'Mease Valley Light Railway'.

Statfold Engineering Ltd is a separate company operating on the same site operated by Graham Lee's grandson, Nick Noon. Established in 2017, it undertakes work for outside customers, mainly in the railway industry.

== Rolling stock ==
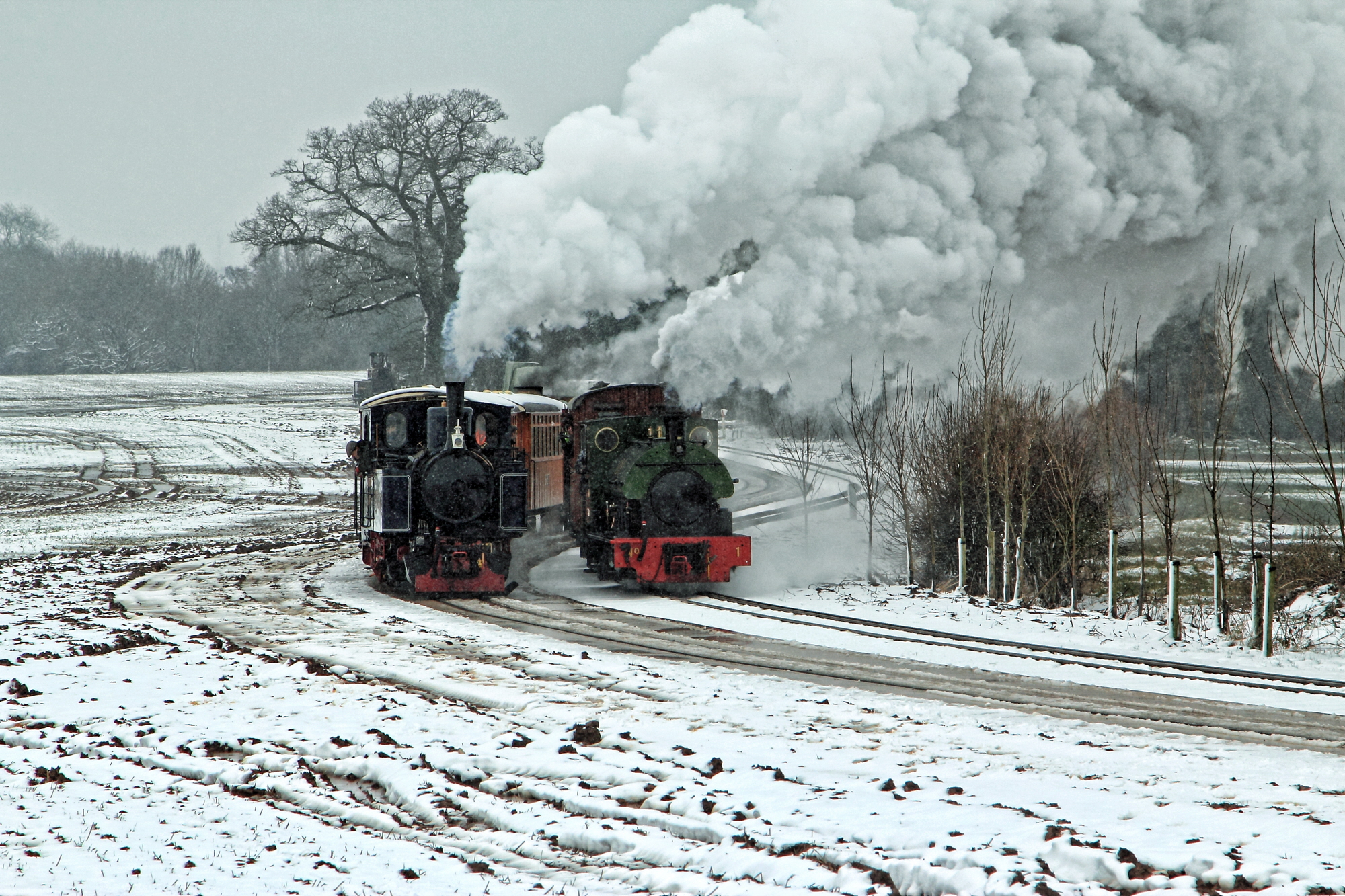
Statfold Barn Railway Open Day 2013

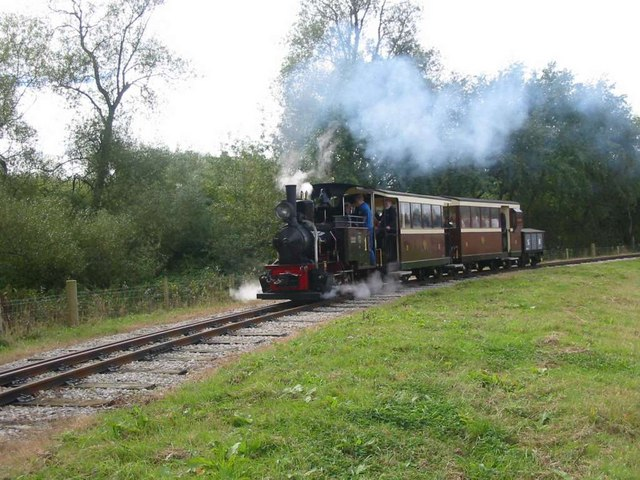
Dual gauge track in 2007. The 2 ft 6 in gauge rail has since been discontinued owing to the dominance of the 2 ft gauge.

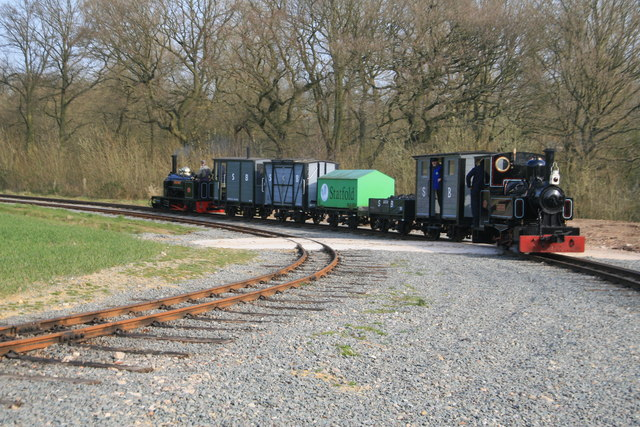
Marchlyn of Avonside in front of Sybil Mary of Hunslet

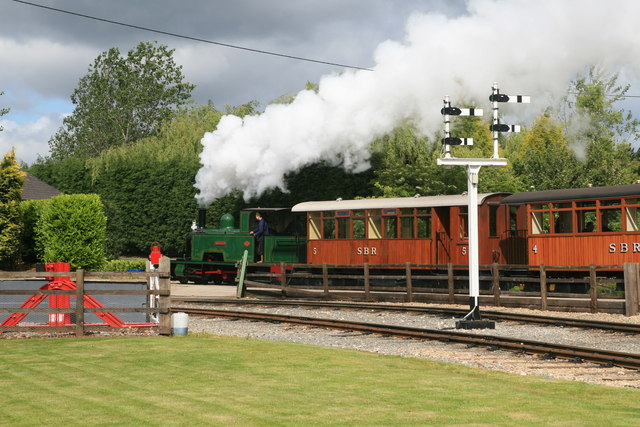
Isibutu of W. G. Bagnall

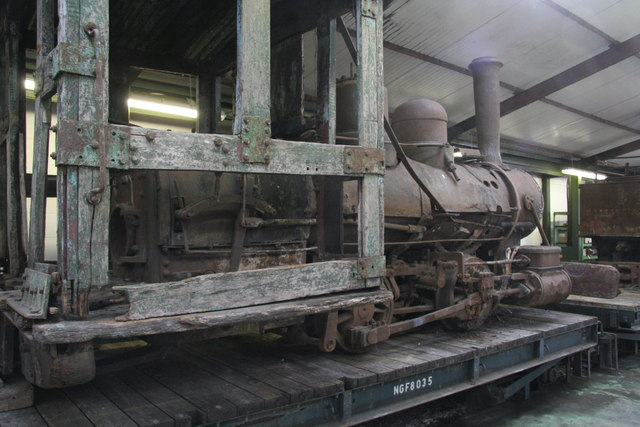
Davenport before restoration.

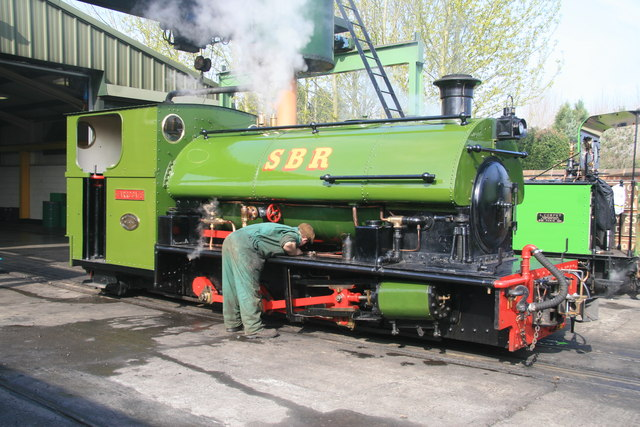
Harrogate of Peckett and Sons (built for Harrogate Gasworks Railway)

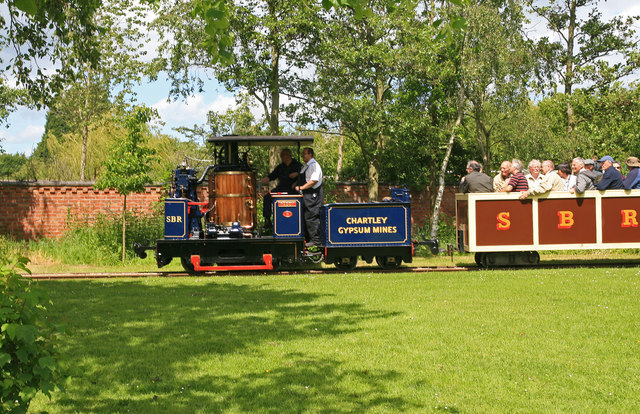
Vertical Boilered Paddy (now named Howard) on the Garden Railway

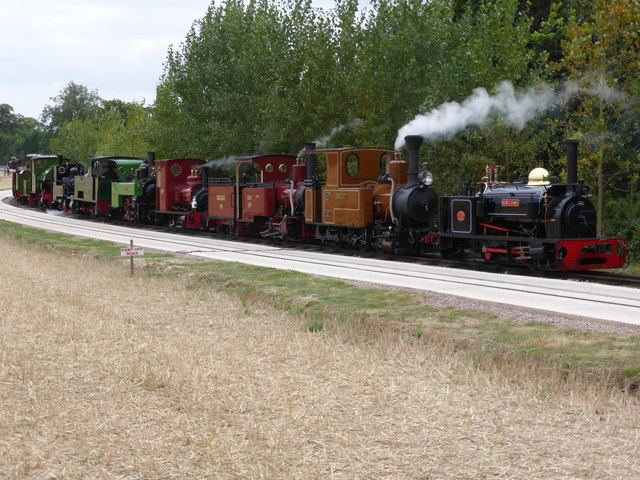
A cavalcade of steam locomotives

=== Steam locomotives ===
Identity	Works number	Type	Gauge	Builder	Year built	Previous operator	Status	Notes	Image
Hodbarrow	299	0-4-0ST	4 ft 8 1/2 in (1,435 mm)	Hunslet	1882		Exhibit		
Glenfield No.1	880	0-4-0CT	4 ft 8 1/2 in (1,435 mm)	Andrew Barclay	1902	Glenfield & Kennedy Ltd, Kilmarnock	Exhibit	Cosmetically restored, on display outside the entrance	
Minas de Aller No. 2	439	0-6-0PT	600 mm (1 ft 11 5/8 in)	Corpet-Louvet	1884	Brown-pattern indirect drive to lower connecting rod via lever and fulcrum; Joy's valve gear. Coal mines, Aller, Asturias, Spain.	Operational	Restored to working order in 2012.	
Portugesa	748	0-4-0ST	600 mm (1 ft 11 5/8 in)	Black, Hawthorn & Co	1883	Oldest 'Leeds Mainstream'- pattern narrow gauge locomotive in Britain built outside Leeds. Minas Y Ferrocarriles de Utrillas, Teruel, Spain	Undergoing restoration		
King of the Scarlets	492	0-4-0ST	1 ft 10 3/4 in (578 mm)	Hunslet	1889	Dinorwic Quarry	Exhibit	In original open-cab form. Now substantively a mainstream Alice class but contains much material from 1903-built Maid Marian. In Canada 1965–2012.	
DHR 778	3518	0-4-0ST	2 ft (610 mm)	Sharp, Stewart	1889	Darjeeling Himalayan Railway	Undergoing 10 Year overhaul & New Boiler is being constructed	DHR B Class. Purchased by The Darjeeling Tank Locomotive Trust 2023 from former Beeches Light Railway.	
Sragi No. 1	4045	0-4-2T	2 ft (610 mm)	Krauss	1899	Sragi Sugar Mill, Pekalongan, Central Java	Operational	Restored to working order in 2008.	
Handy Man	573	0-4-0ST	3 ft (914 mm)	Hudswell Clarke	1900	Burton Ironstone Company	Cosmetic Restoration	Transferred from the National Railway Museum in 2021.	
Pakis Baru No. 1	614	0-4-0WTT	2 ft 6 in (762 mm)	Orenstein & Koppel	1900		Exhibit	Restored to working order in June 2006.	
Pakis Baru No. 5	1473	0-4-4-0T; Mallet	2 ft 6 in (762 mm)	Orenstein & Koppel	1905	Pakis Baru Sugar Mill in Pati, Central Java	Exhibit	Restored to working order in March 2007.	
Sybil Mary	921	0-4-0ST	2 ft (610 mm)	Hunslet	1906	Penrhyn Quarry 'Large Quarry' class.	Operational	Restored to working order in 2013 in original open-cab form.	
Seaforth	1026	0-4-2T	2 ft (610 mm)	Hunslet	1910	Pleystow sugar mill, Queensland	Awaiting restoration	Repatriated in 2021	
No. 11 Fiji	972	0-6-0	2 ft (610 mm)	Hudswell Clarke	1912	Lautoka sugar mill, Fiji	Operational	Converted to diesel for operation on a tourist railway. Returned to UK in 2011, arrived at Statfold in 2012 and restored to working order in its original steam form in 2014. Overhauled in 2020.	
No. 19	1056	0-4-0ST	2 ft (610 mm)	Hudswell Clarke	1914	Lautoka sugar mill, Fiji (descended from W/N 853 North Eton Mill No. 2 but with outside valve gear).	Operational	Restored to working order in 2013.	
Saccharine	13355	0-4-2T	2 ft (610 mm)	Fowler	1914	Sugar plantation in South Africa	Operational	Restored to working order in 2010. Overhauled in 2020.	
	3010	0-6-0WT	2 ft (610 mm)	Kerr, Stuart and Company	1916	French Government Artillery Railways (Maker's Joffre class).	Awaiting restoration as of 2017.	First imported to UK for preservation in 1974.	
WDLR 779	44657	4-6-0PT	2 ft (610 mm)	Baldwin	1916	British War Department Light Railways, France; Ryam Sugar Company, Bihar state, India	Undergoing restoration		
Cannonball Express	1586	0-4-0	2 ft (610 mm)	Davenport	1917	Ryam Sugar Company, Bihar state, India	Operational	Restored to working order in 2015.	
	1735	0-6-0WT	2 ft (610 mm)	Decauville	1919	French Government Artillery Railways (Ancestor of Kerr, Stuart Joffre class), Mozambique	Dismantled as of 2017	Imported for preservation 2000.	
	14928	0-8-0T	2 ft (610 mm)	Henschel	1917	Deutsche Feldbahn (Klien-Lindner axles); Marromeu sugar mill, Mozambique	Awaiting restoration, for sale as of 2017		
2 Roger	3128	0-4-0ST	2 ft (610 mm)	Kerr, Stuart and Company	1918	Imperial Smelting Co., Avonmouth, Bristol (Maker's Wren class).	Operational	Formerly spent some time in Canada. Mainly used on the Garden Railway.	
6 Howard (previously Paddy)	2	0-4-0VBT	2 ft (610 mm)	'Wilbrighton Wagon Works'	2007	Amerton Railway	Exhibit	Incorporates older components. In main entrance / ticket hall	
Alpha	1172	0-6-0PT	2 ft (610 mm)	Hudswell Clarke	1922	Ryam Sugar Company, Bihar (Maker's 'P' class).	Operational	Restored to working order in 2016.	
Sragi No. 14; Max	10705	0-6-0WT+T	2 ft (610 mm)	Orenstein & Koppel	1923	Sragi Sugar Mill, Pekalongan, Central Java.	Operational		
Liassic	1632	0-6-0ST	1 ft 11 1/2 in (597 mm)	Peckett	1923	Southam Cement Works, Warwickshire	Operational as of 2017	Restored to working order in 2017.	
No. GP 39	1643	0-6-0WT	2 ft (610 mm)	Hudswell Clarke	1930	Surrey County Council Highways Department (Maker's 'G' class).	Operational but with non-authentic boiler.	Penrhyn Slate Quarry Bronllwyd, then at Bressingham Steam Museum 1966–2010. Overhauled in 2017.	
Jatibarang 9	4878	0-4-4-0T; Mallet	2 ft (610 mm)	Jung	1930	Jatibarang Sugar Mill, Brebes, Indonesia	Static Exhibit	Restored to working order in 2011.	
Cegin	1991	0-4-0WT	2 ft (610 mm)	Andrew Barclay	1931	County Durham Reservoir, later Penrhyn Slate Quarry (Maker's 'E' class).	Operational	In North America 1965–2016.	
Michael	1709	0-4-0ST	1 ft 10 3/4 in (578 mm)	Hunslet	1932 (Dinorwic Port [2] class)	Dinorwic Quarry	Awaiting restoration to working order as of 2017.	In Canada 1965–2012.	
Ogwen	2066	0-4-0T	2 ft (610 mm)	Avonside	1933	County Durham Reservoir, later Penrhyn Quarry.	Visiting	In United States 1965–2012.	
Marchlyn	2067	0-4-0T	2 ft (610 mm)	Avonside	1933	County Durham Reservoir, later Penrhyn Quarry (Sister to Ogwen)	Operational	In United States 1965–2011; restored to working order in 2012.	
Howard No. 2 (previously Lady Morrison)	1842	0-4-2ST	2 ft (610 mm)	Hunslet	1936	British Aluminium Company, Fort William	Awaiting Overhaul	A latter-day representative of the Kerr, Stuart 'Old Type Brazil' class. Restored to working order (re-gauged from original 3 ft.) in 2014. Its older classmate (built by Kerr, Stuart in 1916) is now with the Cavan and Leitrim Railway in the Irish Republic, still 3 ft. gauge but with side tanks and a non-original pattern boiler.	
Harrogate	2050	0-6-0ST	2 ft (610 mm)	Peckett	1944	Harrogate Gas Works (originally fitted with cut down cab and chimney).	Operational	Overhauled in 2024.	
Isaac	3023	0-4-2T	2 ft (610 mm)	W. G. Bagnall	1953	Rustenburg Platinum Mines, South Africa	Operational	Overhauled in 2012; moved to the railway in 2021.	
A. Boulle	2627	4-4-0T	2 ft (610 mm)	W. G. Bagnall	1940	Tongaat Sugar, Natal	Exhibit	Arrived on loan August 2023	
Isibutu	2820	4-4-0T	2 ft (610 mm)	W. G. Bagnall	1945	Tongaat Sugar, Natal	Operational	Overhauled in 2021.	
Wendy	2091	0-4-0ST	2 ft (610 mm)	W. G. Bagnall	1919	Dorothea Quarry, Nantlle Valley (previously Votty & Bowydd Quarry, Blaenau Ffestiniog)	Awaiting Overhaul	Donated by Hampshire Narrow Gauge Railway Society in 2019.	
Tamar	3756	0-4-2PT	2 ft (610 mm)	Hunslet	1952	Cameroon Development Corporation	Operational	Kerr, Stuart Tamar class design, a pannier tank variant of the Kerr, Stuart 'New Type Brazil' class. Converted to oil-firing in 2026.	
Trangkil No. 4	3902	0-4-2ST	750 mm (2 ft 5 1/2 in) regauged 2 ft (610 mm)	Hunslet	1971	Trangkil Sugar Mill, Pati, Central Java (built to Kerr, Stuart 'New Type Brazil' class drawings but with a more modern pattern of feed pump).	Operational		
Gertrude	995	0-4-0ST	2 ft (610 mm)	Hunslet	1909	Penrhyn Quarry	Sectioned exhibit (Sister to Sybil Mary).	Open cab. In Canada from early 1960s to 2017.	
Cloister	542	0-4-0ST	2 ft (610 mm)	Hunslet	1891 (Dinorwic Alice class).	Dinorwic Quarry	Static Exhibit	Donated by Hampshire Narrow Gauge Railway Society in 2019.	
Statfold	3903	0-4-0ST	2 ft (610 mm)	Hunslet	2005	Statfold Barn Railway (Updated version of Michael).	Operational	Enclosed cab. Overhauled in 2017.	
Jack Lane	3904	0-4-0ST	2 ft (610 mm)	Hunslet	2005	Statfold Barn Railway (Updated version of Michael).	Operational	Open cab. Overhauled in 2016.	
K1	5292	0-4-0+0-4-0 Garratt	2 ft (610 mm)	Beyer, Peacock and Company	1909	Tasmanian Government Railways K class	Operational	Transferred temporarily from Welsh Highland Railway 2019 for overhaul, which was completed in 2020.	
Jack	684	0-4-0WT	18 in (457 mm)	Hunslet	1898	John Knowles (fireclay works), Woodville, Derbyshire	Operational as of 2018	Restored to working order in 1984 whilst at Armley Mills Industrial Museum, Leeds.	
Woolwich	1748	0-4-0T	18 in (457 mm)	Avonside	1915 (Derived from 2 ft. gauge locos for South Africa but with outside valve gear).	Royal Arsenal Railway, Woolwich	Cosmetically restored	Donated to the railway in 2020.	
Victoria	332	2-4-2T	12 1/4 in (311 mm)	Exmoor Steam Railway	2007	Statfold Barn Railway	Operational	Mease Valley Light Railway	
Carol Ann	350	2-6-2	12 1/4 in (311 mm)	Exmoor Steam Railway	2024	Statfold Barn Railway	Operational	Mease Valley Light Railway	

=== Diesel locomotives ===
Identity	Works number	Type	Gauge	Builder	Year built	Previous operator	Status	Notes	Image
	1891	4wDM	4 ft 8 1/2 in (1,435 mm) regauged to 2 ft (610 mm)	Plymouth Locomotive Works	1924	a quarry in Ohio	Unknown		
	20777	0-4-0DM	2 ft (610 mm)	Orenstein & Koppel	1936	ex Kriegsmarine (Keil), ex Norden Clay Works, Dorset, ex Durley Light Railway.	Operational		
Sam	2019	0-4-0DM	2 ft 6 in (762 mm)	Hunslet for Robert Hudson	1939	RNAD Broughton Moor	Unknown	Flameproof	
Atlas	2463	4wDM	2 ft (610 mm)	Hunslet	1941	Ministry of Defence depot, Long Marston, Warwickshire, later to Abbey Light Railway	Unknown		
	3621	4wDM	2 ft (610 mm)	Hunslet for Robert Hudson	1947		Under restoration as of 2017		
Charley	9976	4wDM	2 ft (610 mm)	Motor Rail	1954	Somerset River Board	Operational		
Brambridge Hall	5226	4wDM	2 ft (610 mm)	Motor Rail	1936	Hall & Co., Brambridge gravel pits, Colden Common (previously A. E. Farr, Winchester By-Pass construction)	Operational	Donated by Hampshire Narrow Gauge Railway Society in 2019.	
AGWI Pet	4724	4wDM	2 ft (610 mm)	Motor Rail	1939	Anglo Gulf West Indies Petroleum Corporation, Fawley Refinery	Operational	Donated by Hampshire Narrow Gauge Railway Society in 2019.	
	5800	4wDM	3 ft (914 mm) regauged to 2 ft (610 mm)	Plymouth	1954	St Marys Cement Company, Ohio	Operational		
	418776 or 418767	4wDM	2 ft (610 mm)	Ruston & Hornsby	1957	Canada	Unknown		
	6137	4wDM	3 ft (914 mm) regauged to 2 ft (610 mm)	Plymouth	1958	St Marys Cement Company, Ohio	Operational		
W114H	6720	4wDH	2 ft (610 mm)	Hunslet-Taylor	1965	Western Reefs Gold Mine, South Africa	Operational		
N13H	7588	4wDH	2 ft (610 mm)	Hunslet-Taylor	1968	Vaal Reefs Gold Mine, South Africa	Unknown		
Welsh Highland No. 5	6285	4wDM	2 ft 6 in (762 mm) regauged to 2 ft (610 mm)	Hunslet	1968	Millom Haematite Ore & Iron Co Ltd	Unknown	Returned to Welsh Highland Heritage Railway 2017	
35	7010; 6941	4wDH	2 ft (610 mm)	Hunslet, rebuilt by Andrew Barclay	1971 (rebuilt 1988)	Eastriggs	Unknown		
	40SD503	4wDM	2 ft (610 mm)	Motor Rail	1975	Minworth sewage treatment works	Operational		
	8819	4wDH	Originally 3 ft (914 mm), now 2 ft (610 mm)	Hunslet	1979	Nantgarw Colliery	Unknown		
Tom	D1447; 8847	0-6-0DM	2 ft 6 in (762 mm)	Hudswell Clarke post acquisition by Hunslet	1981	John Summers & Sons steelworks, Shotton, Flintshire	Unknown		
A10	3782	4wDH	2 ft 6 in (762 mm) regauged to 2 ft (610 mm)	Baguley-Drewry	1984	RNAD Trecwn	Sold to Amerton Railway 2017		
	9294	4wDH	3 ft (914 mm)	Hunslet	1991	British Coal, Stillingfleet Mine, Yorkshire	Unknown	Flameproof	
	9351	4wDH	2 ft (610 mm)	Hunslet	1991	Hire to Balfour Beatty Amec Joint Venture for London Underground Jubilee Line Extension construction, later to Lower Lea Valley Cable Tunnels construction	Unknown		
	9332	4wDH	2 ft (610 mm)	Hunslet	1994	Jan-Pan, Singapore	Operational		
D4	1001	4wDM	2 ft (610 mm)	Funkey	Unknown		Unknown		
D5	1033	4wDM	2 ft (610 mm)	Funkey	Unknown		Unknown		
Carnegie	4524	0-4-4-0DM	18 in (457 mm)	Hunslet	1954	Royal Arsenal Railway, Woolwich	Operational	Delivered 2020.	
4 Alistair	201970	4wDM	2 ft (610 mm)	Ruston & Hornsby	1940	Bierrum & Partners; Ffestiniog Railway; Hayling Seaside Railway	Operational	On site as of 2021.	
	73	0-6-0DH	12 1/4 in (311 mm)	Alan Keef	2005	Private owner, north Devon	Operational		

=== Petrol locomotives ===
Identity	Works number	Type	Gauge	Builder	Year built	Previous operator	Status	Notes	Image
	680	0-4-0PM	4 ft 8 1/2 in (1,435 mm)	Baguley	1916	Jacob's biscuits, Aintree (originally Ministry of Munitions National Filling Factory No 2)		Originally paraffin powered, changed to petrol in 1927	
774	774	0-4-0PM	2 ft (610 mm)	Baguley	1919	Timber Supply Department railway at Pennal, then Oakeley Slate Quarry, then preserved by Rodney Weaver, sold to Gloddfa Ganol, purchased by the Narrow Gauge Railway Museum, cosmetically restored at the Amerton Railway	Unknown	Stored at Statfold between 2008 and 2012, then returned to the Narrow Gauge Railway Museum in Tywyn	
8	39924	4wPM	2 ft (610 mm)	Robert Hudson	1924	Cairngryffe Quarry	Unknown		
	36863	4wPM	2 ft (610 mm)	Robert Hudson	c. 1929		Restored	Paraffin powered; restored 1987	
INCO No 3	4049	4wPM	2 ft (610 mm)	Vulcan Iron Works	1929	Inco Nickel Refinery, Port Colborne, Ontario		Converted to run on propane	
INCO No 5	4196	4wPM	2 ft (610 mm)	Vulcan Iron Works	1936	Inco Nickel Refinery, Port Colborne, Ontario			
Charles	3746	4wPM	2 ft (610 mm)	Brookville	1951	Nichols Chemical Company, Sulphide Ontario	Unknown		
	38384	4wPM	2 ft (610 mm)	Robert Hudson	1930	Steelworks, Staveley, Derbyshire	Under restoration		

=== Compressed air locomotives ===
Identity	Works number	Type	Gauge	Builder	Year built	Previous operator	Status	Notes	Image
Sid	9902	0-4-0CA	2 ft (610 mm)	Etherington/Statfold Barn Railway	2009				

=== Electric locomotives ===
Identity	Works number	Type	Gauge	Builder	Year built	Previous operator	Status	Notes	Image
	6092	4wBE	2 ft 6 in (762 mm)	Wingrove & Rogers	1958	Beckermet Mining Co Ltd			
	420253	4wBE	2 ft (610 mm)	Greenwood & Batley	1970	Weardale Lead Co Ltd	Operational		
	5940A	4wBE	2 ft (610 mm)	Clayton Equipment Company	1972	Streeters			
The Coalition	1278	0-4-0E	2 ft (610 mm)	W. G. Bagnall, rebuilt by Llechwedd quarry	1890 (rebuilt c. 1930)	Llechwedd quarry	Awaiting restoration	Rebuilt from 0-4-0T Edith. Loaned from Slate Heritage International 2019	
The Eclipse	1445	0-4-0E	2 ft (610 mm)	W. G. Bagnall, rebuilt by Llechwedd quarry	1895 (rebuilt 1927)	Llechwedd quarry	Awaiting restoration	Rebuilt from 0-4-0ST Margaret. Loaned from Slate Heritage International 2019	
809		A-1-1-A	2 ft (610 mm)	English Electric	1931	London Post Office Railway	Static display	London Post Office Railway 1930 Stock	

=== Railcars ===
Identity	Works number	Type	Gauge	Builder	Year built	Previous operator	Status	Notes	Image
Libbie	1097	2w-2PM	4 ft 8 1/2 in (1,435 mm)	Baguley	1920	École Chemin de Fer, France	Operational		
	4091	2w-2PMR	3 ft (914 mm)	Wickham	1946		Dismantled		
	4164	2w-2PMR	4 ft 8 1/2 in (1,435 mm)	Wickham	1948		Dismantled		
	5864	2w-2PMR	3 ft 6 in (1,067 mm)	Wickham	1951	Snaefell Mountain Railway	Dismantled		
DX 68010; DB965987	7073	2w-2PMR	4 ft 8 1/2 in (1,435 mm)	Wickham	1955		Unknown		
	3170	Target trolley	2 ft (610 mm)	Wickham	c. 1943	Ministry of Supply, Lydd Ranges	Operational	Loaned from The Rail Trolley Trust 2020	
	(4164)	4wDMR	Convertible from 2 ft (610 mm) up to 4 ft 8 1/2 in (1,435 mm)	J Craven	1987			Converted from a Wickham trolley built in 1948	
	9903	4w-2DM	2 ft (610 mm)	Land Rover converted at Statfold Barn Railway	2009		Operational		
The Goose		4-4wPMR	2 ft (610 mm)	Statfold Barn Railway	2015		Operational	Built on Morris lorry chassis	
14/3	252319	2w-2PMR	4 ft 8 1/2 in (1,435 mm)	Fairmont	?	Canada	Unknown		
CN 168-31		2w-2PMR	4 ft 8 1/2 in (1,435 mm)	Fairmont	?	Canada	Unknown		
		2w-2PMR	4 ft 8 1/2 in (1,435 mm)	Fairmont	?	Canada	Unknown		

=== Trams ===
Identity	Works number	Type	Gauge	Builder	Year built	Previous operator	Status	Notes	Image
14		Single Truck, Double Deck (open Top)	900 mm (2 ft 11 7/16 in)	Brush	1906	Midland Railway, Burton and Ashby Light Railway	Operational	Previously 3'6" gauge. Withdrawn when the Burton & Ashby Light Railways were closed in 1927. Body survived in a garden in Church Gresley until removed for preservation circa 1970. Exported to Detroit USA 1976 where it was mounted on a Lisbon tramways 900mm gauge truck. Returned to UK 2014 and rebuilt at Statfold with a Clayton battery electric traction package.	

=== Unpowered passenger stock ===
In May 2014 the railway obtained a rake of four passenger coaches, originally built in 1984 for the Thorpe Park theme park, and latterly used on the Lynton and Barnstaple Railway but in 2023, following the acquisition of other stock, these were donated to the Bala Lake Railway. In 2019 it was donated a coach which originated with the Ramsgate Tunnel Railway of 1936. In 2023 the railway brought three more coaches from the South Tyne Side railway which was then joined by the Beaches light railway coaches as they had been brought and permanently moved there by The Darjeeling Tank Locomotive Trust.
