= Nupla Khang =

Mountain in the Himalayas

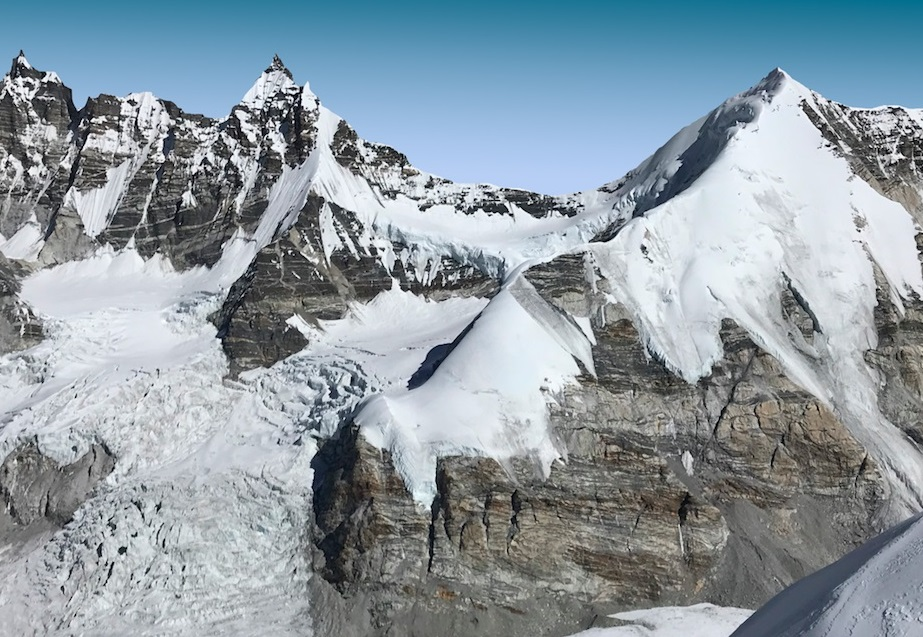
- The South face of Nupla Khang on the right

Highest point
- Elevation: 6,861 m (22,510 ft)
- Coordinates: 28°04′27″N 86°46′01″E

Geography
- Location within Nepal
- Location: Border of Tibet and Nepal
- Parent range: Himalayas

Climbing
- First ascent: November 02, 2018 by an expedition led by Garrett Madison and Aang Phurba Sherpa

Nupla Khang is a mountain in the Mahalangur Himal section of the Himalayas along the border of Nepal and China. The peak is situated between Cho Oyu to the east and Everest to the west.

Nupla Kahng was first climbed on 2 November 2018 by Garrett Madison, Ingvild Marie Settemsdel of Norway, Joshua Joseph Miller, Sidney Pattison, Kristin Ann Bennett, and Ben Veres, all from the US as part of a multinational expedition. Also climbing and part of the expedition were Nepalese Sherpa: Aang Phurba Sherpa, Pasdawa Sherpa, Kam Dorjee Sherpa, Tashi Sherpa, Lakpa Dendi and Pemba Tenzing.
