= DHR B Class =

Class of narrow gauge steam locomotives built for Darjeeling Himalayan Railway

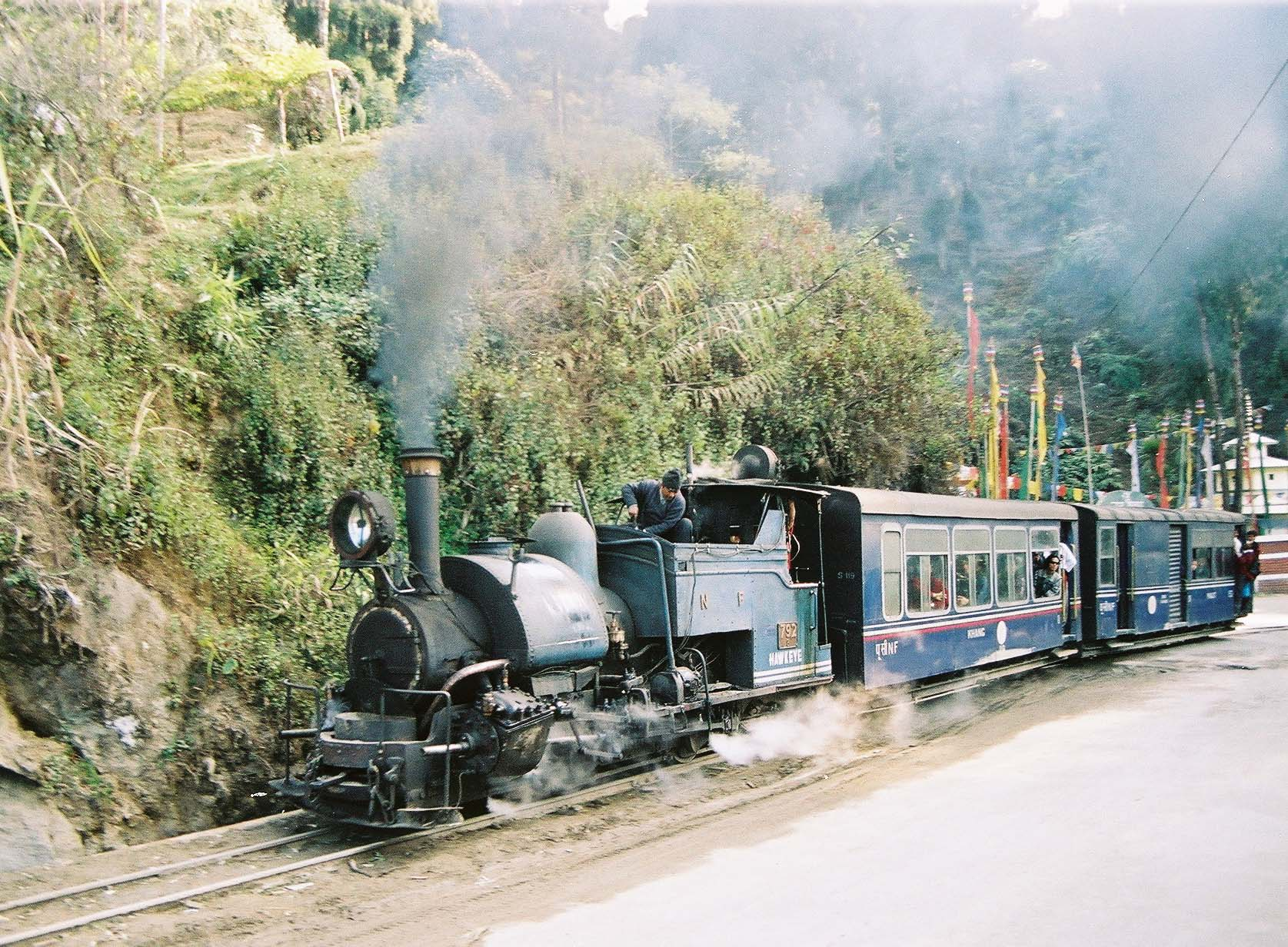
- No. 792 hauling a school train, 2005
Type and origin
- Power type: Steam
- Builder: Sharp, Stewart & Co. (12); North British Locomotive Co. (16); Baldwin Locomotive Works (3); DHR Tindharia Works (3)
- Build date: 1889–1925
- Total produced: 34
Specifications
- Configuration
  - Whyte: 0-4-0ST
  - UIC: B n2t
- Gauge: 2 ft (610 mm)
- Driver dia.: 26 in (0.660 m)
- Axle load: 7.75 long tons (7.87 t)
- Loco weight: 14 long tons (14 t)
- Firebox
  - Grate area: 9 sq ft (0.84 m^{2})
- Boiler pressure: 140 psi (0.97 MPa)
- Heating surface: 316 sq ft (29.4 m^{2})
- Superheater: None
- Cylinders: Two, outside
- Cylinder size: 11 in × 14 in (279 mm × 356 mm)
Performance figures
- Tractive effort: 7,750 lbf (34.47 kN)
Career
- Operators: Darjeeling Himalayan Railway; → Indian Railways
- Class: B
- Numbers: DHR: 17–30, 32–36, 39–53; All-India: 777–806
- Disposition: Some still in service

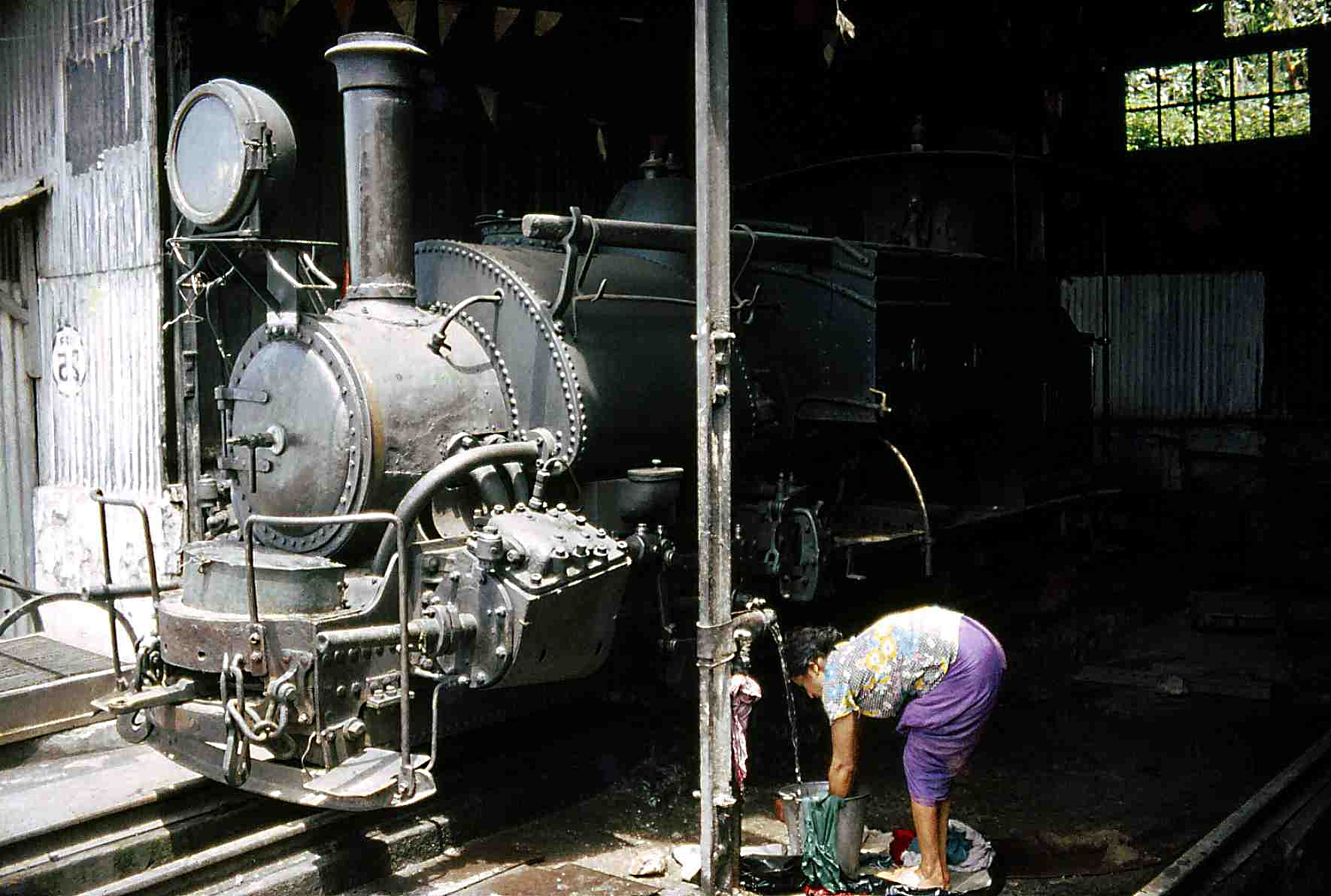
Darjeeling train in shed. 1979

The DHR B Class is a class of 2 ft (610 mm) gauge 0-4-0ST saddle tank steam locomotives used on the Darjeeling Himalayan Railway (DHR) in West Bengal, India.

== Service history ==
A total of 34 B Class locomotives have served on the DHR. Some are still on the working roster. One (DHR 778) was sold for private preservation, and four others were sold to Coal India, Assam. The remaining class members have been either plinthed in various locations in northern India or scrapped. Of the few in active service, the locomotives 788 'Tusker' and 'Victor' haul trains between Darjeeling to Ghum stations via Batasia loop, quite a few times a day. Another loco, DHR 780 is kept preserved with two narrow gauge coaches at Eco Park, Rajarhat, as an exhibit.

19B was re-imported to the UK c. 2000 and underwent restoration before spending two decades operating at the Beeches Light Railway.

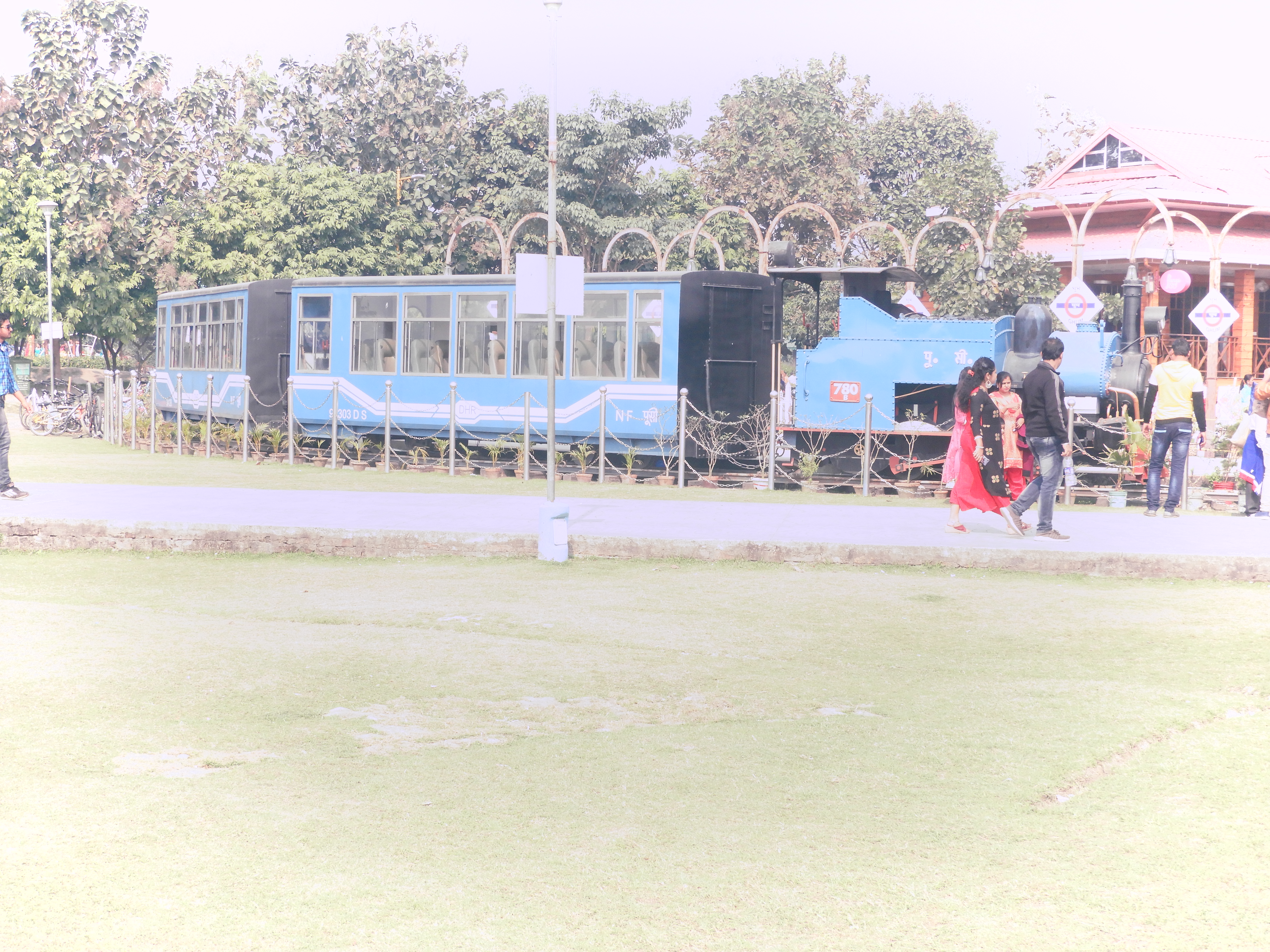
Preserved DHR 780 with 2 coaches

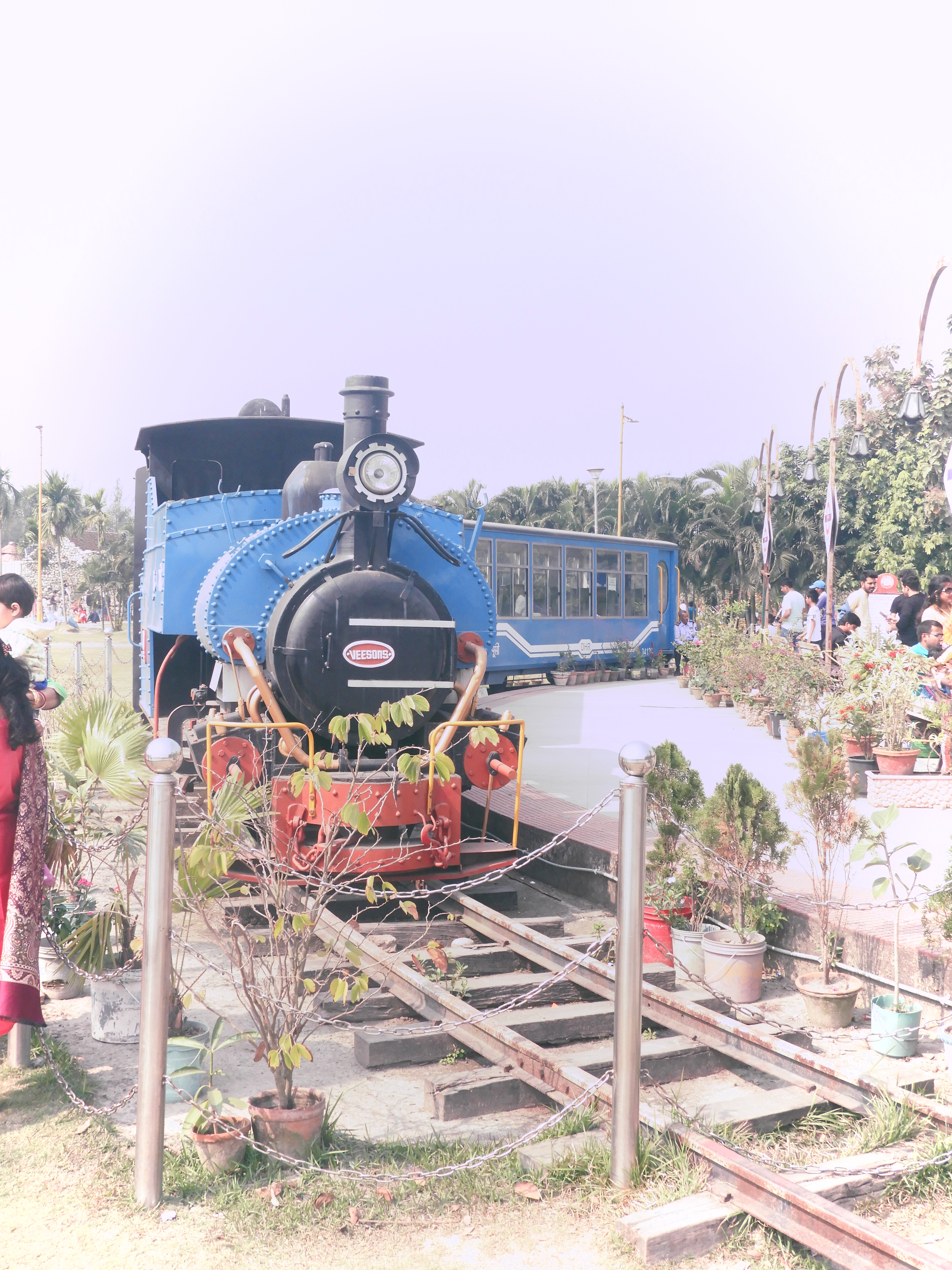
The front look of the preserved DHR B Class - showing the saddle tank

== Livery ==
Initially, all members of the class were liveried in DHR green. For a short period after World War II, they were repainted black. Later, they ran in an unlined red colour. They were given their current Caledonian blue with white lining after coming into ownership of the Northeast Frontier Railway in 1958.

== Preserved examples ==
DHR Nº	Manufacturer	Serial Nº	Built	IR Nº	Location	Current status	Image	Notes
28	Sharp, Stewart & Co.	4978	1903	785	Dehradun railway station	Display		
32	North British Locomotive Co.	20143	1913	787	Siliguri Junction station	Display		
33	North British Locomotive Co.	20144	1913	788	Darjeeling Himalayan Railway, India	Operational		
41	Sharp, Stewart & Co.	44914	1917	794	Neral shed	Display		
42				795				

== See also ==
- Rail transport in India#History
- Indian Railways
- Locomotives of India
- Rail transport in India
