= Boston Lodge =

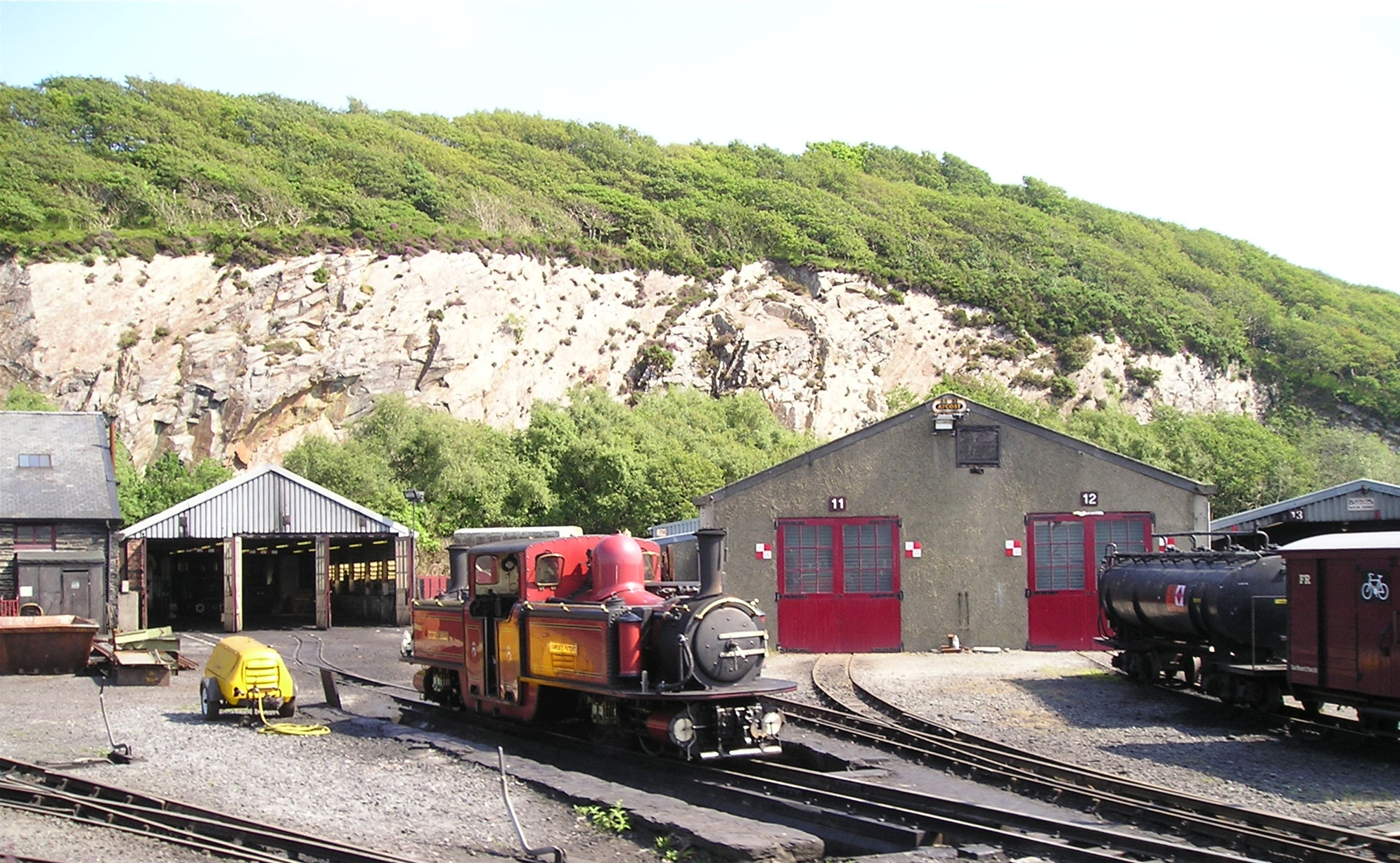
Boston Lodge works seen from a passing train

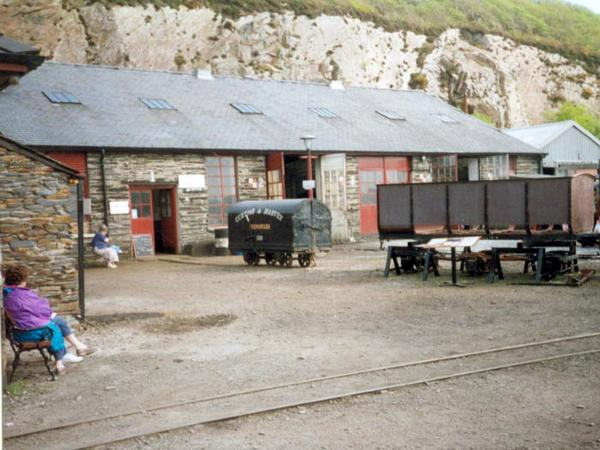
Boston Lodge yard, 1995

Boston Lodge is situated at Penrhyn Isa, Minffordd, Penrhyndeudraeth, on the A487 road about 1 mile SE across the Afon Glaslyn causeway from Porthmadog, Gwynedd in north-west Wales.

It has a station on the Ffestiniog Railway and is the location of the railway's main engineering workshops, locomotive shed and carriage works. The Boston Lodge address and postcode is shared by the works with four cottage dwellings (mostly occupied in connection with the railway) and with the former tollgate cottage at the end of the causeway. The original 'Penrhyn Isa' cottage (now the railway works office) was renamed 'Boston Lodge' after Boston, Lincolnshire, the parliamentary seat of William Madocks, the proprietor of the land reclamation venture.

== Early history ==
Construction of the causeway, known locally as ‘The Cob’, linking Penrhyn Isa on the Merioneth shore with the small rocky island called Ynys Towyn (where Britannia Terrace now stands in Porthmadog) near the Caernarfonshire shore, started in 1807 and was completed in 1811 during which time large quantities of stone was quarried and extracted from both ends. The embankment, which was the final stage of the Traeth Mawr land reclamation scheme, was 24 feet (7.3 m) wide at the top (where the railway now runs), 180 feet (55 m) wide at the base, 21 feet (6.4 m) deep and about 1 mile (1.6 km) in length. The quarrying created both the Britannia Terrace site at Porthmadog and the railway workshops site at Boston Lodge.

The site at Boston Lodge first held barracks for many of the 150 men working from the Merioneth side on the embankment construction, together with stables and smithies for the horses and wagons used to carry the stone. Later with the coming of the horsedrawn Festiniog Railway, the stables and smithies were brought back into use from 1836 onwards and there has been almost continuous development of the site for railway purposes since that time.

== Ffestiniog Railway ==
In the years from 1847 to 1851 the works was considerably developed by the construction of ferrous and non-ferrous foundries, a pattern making shop, a blacksmith's shop, a carpenter's shop, and an engine house in which a steam engine provided power for machinery in a sawmill, pattern shop and machine shops. In the 1870s further construction provided a paint shop, joiner's shop and erecting shop in which in 1879 and 1885 the double Fairlie engines Merddin Emrys and Livingston Thompson were built. Prior to 1915 the works employed about 30 men. During World War I most of the works was used as a munitions factory (largely staffed by women) from 17 September 1915 until early in 1919. The fortunes of the railway and its works declined from the mid-1920s with total closure from March 1947 to September 1954.

== Preservation era ==
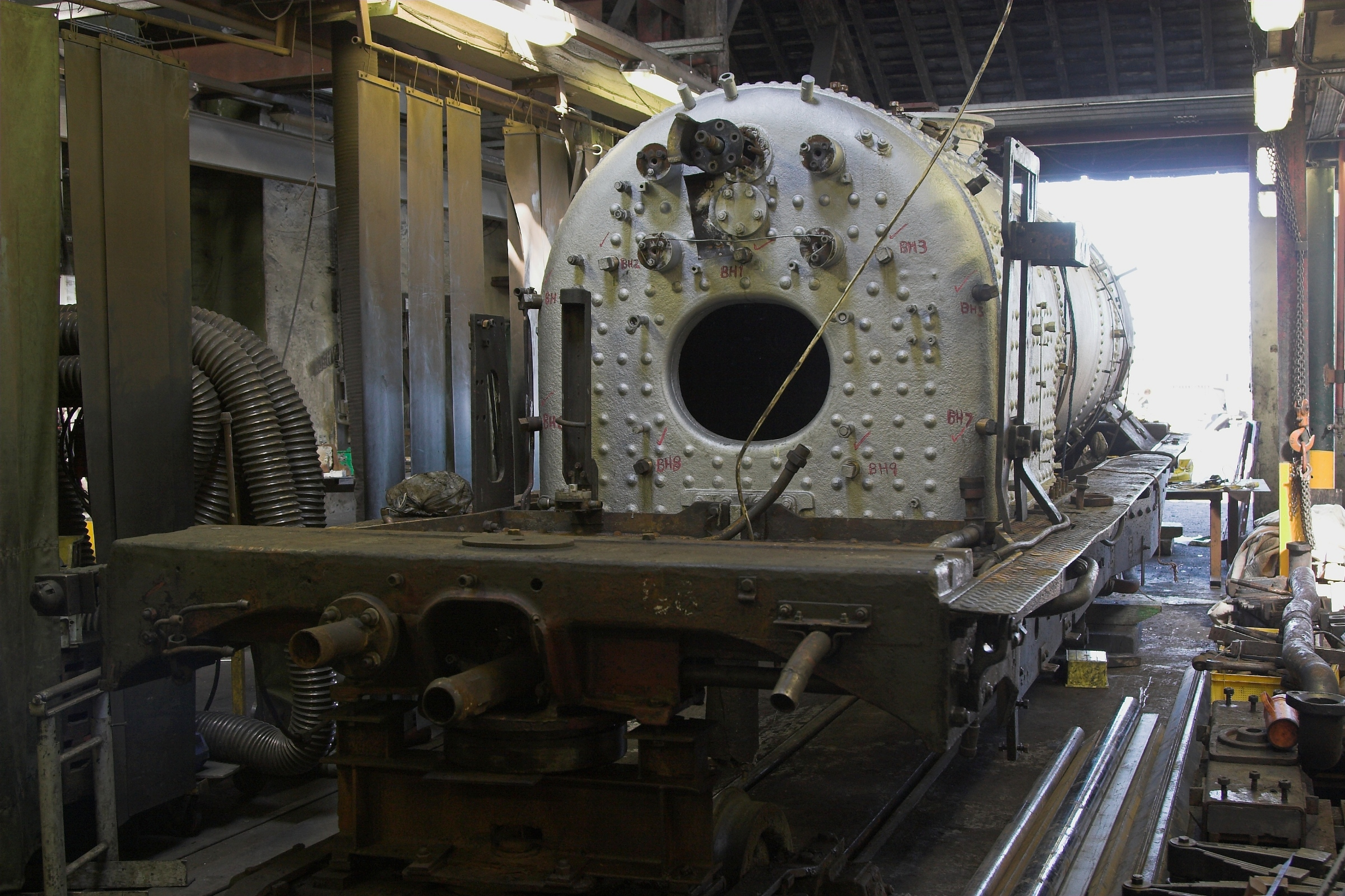
Boiler of Welsh Highland NG138 during overhaul at Boston Lodge.

The works reopened on 20 September 1954, since when many of the original buildings have been extensively repaired and their usage altered. Machinery has been updated and modern materials and techniques have been introduced. Additional workshops have been built as well as new locomotive servicing facilities and carriage storage depots. The works undertakes the restoration and preservation of the railway's historic locomotives, carriages, wagons and features of all descriptions. It also builds new steam locomotives and passenger carriages, and undertakes the ongoing maintenance of the Ffestiniog Railway's expanding fleet of railway vehicles.

In 1977, Boston lodge works undertook the design and installation of oil-firing equipment on the British Railways locomotive "Owain Glyndwr" on the Vale of Rheidol Railway. This was probably the first of numerous outside contracts that the works has undertaken over the years. These outside contracts have included restoration work on steam engines and the complete construction of various replica narrow-gauge passenger coaches.

In December 1998, a £375,000 Heritage Lottery Fund Grant was awarded to the FR Trust and this provided, amongst other things, for the construction of an extension to the carriage workshop at Boston Lodge to form a ‘Heritage Centre’ that would be a permanent home for the restoration of historic vehicles in a secure environment. Restoration to a very high standard has included most of the surviving Ffestiniog Railway Victorian era passenger coaches and a carefully selected rake of about 50 slate wagons representing most of the variant types characteristic of the local slate operations.

From 1993 onwards Boston Lodge works has undertaken extensive locomotive restoration work for the Ffestiniog Railway owned Welsh Highland Railway (Caernarfon). Recently the works is undertaking the construction of new passenger carriages for service between Caernarfon and Porthmadog.

== Works layout ==
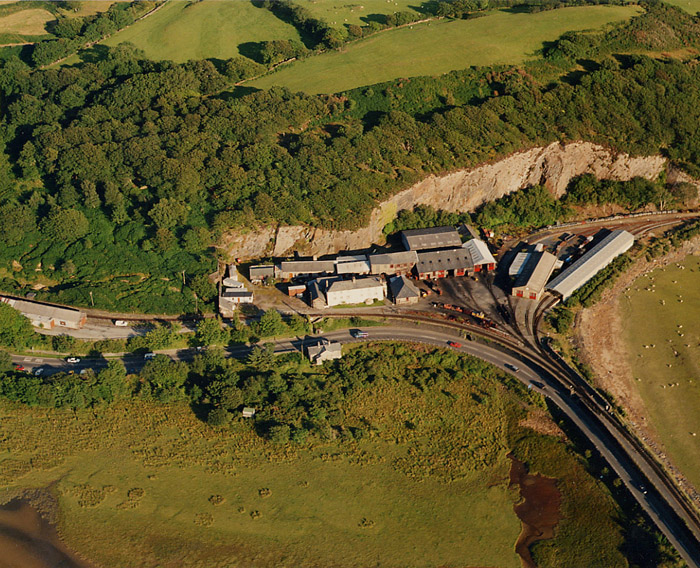
Aerial view of Boston Lodge

In the aerial photograph at right, at the end of the embankment (this end being called locally 'Pen Cob') is the junction into the railway works yard. To the forefront of the works site is the large white building that is Nos: 1 and 2 Boston Lodge Cottages. Next to which, on the right, is the original 'Penrhyn Isa Cottage/Boston Lodge' now the works offices. All the rest in that area is railway works and storage buildings.

Below the railway is the A487 road and in front of that is the 1836 tollgate cottage. Prior to the coming of the Ffestiniog Railway, the road was on the top of the embankment, but in 1836 the present carriageway was constructed on the landward side at the lower level. This lower road was less than 18 feet (5.5 m) wide and quite narrow for a major road. In 2002 it was widened to over 22 feet (6.7 m) with, in addition, a separate cycleway and footpath on the landward side.

== Toll road ==
From its construction in 1811, a toll was levied on users of the embankment. Subsequent to the construction of the Ffestiniog Railway, a new toll road and toll house was built on the landward side adjacent to the embankment but at a lower level. For motor cars, for many years, the toll was a modest one shilling per day (regardless of how many times the vehicle used the road). After the introduction of decimal currency in 1971 the toll became five pence. In the late 1970s the ownership of the tollgate and its cottage was acquired by a specially established local charitable trust called "The Rebecca Trust", which continued to levy the same toll and distributed its profits to local charities. At 3:00pm on Saturday 29 March 2003, the tollgate and its cottage having been bought from the Rebecca Trustees by the Welsh Assembly Government, the toll (still just five pence per day) ceased to be levied.

== Locomotives ==
A number of locomotives have been built for the Ffestiniog Railway at their own Boston Lodge works.

Number	Name	Image	Wheel arrangement	Date	Notes
10	Merddin Emrys		0-4-0+0-4-0T	1879	In service. The oldest operating Double Fairlie on the railway. Named after the 6th century Welsh poet Myrddin Emrys. Received new Hunslet Boiler in early 1970s; converted to oil burning in 1972/73; major restoration and rebuild 1986/7; reverted to coal firing during the winter 2006/07.
11	Livingston Thompson		0-4-0+0-4-0T	1886	Withdrawn and restored as a static display at the National Railway Museum in York.
-	Earl of Merioneth/Iarll Meirionnydd		0-4-0+0-4-0T	1979	Withdrawn from service on 8 April 2018. The first Double Fairlie built by the restored Ffestiniog Railway. Construction started in 1972 following delivery of the boiler. Designed for coal burning, oil tanks and oil burning equipment were fitted in 1978 before the boiler was first steamed. Converted to coal firing in 2007.
12	David Lloyd George/Dafydd Lloyd George		0-4-0+0-4-0T	1992	In service.
9	Taliesin		0-4-4T	1999	In service. The railway's only Single Fairlie. The original 1876 locomotive was severely damaged after colliding into Welsh Pony and was scrapped in 1935 and a replica built in 1999 using a few parts from the original. Its appearance is based on the original's circa 1900. Named after the 6th century Welsh poet Taliesin.
14	Lyd		2-6-2T	2010	Replica of a Manning Wardle locomotive of the Lynton and Barnstaple Railway.
8	James Spooner		0-4-0+0-4-0T	2023	Recently Completed. built as a replacement engine for Earl of Merioneth. The most recent Double Fairlie in the world taking the title from David Lloyd George after completion.
