= List of preserved Hunslet narrow-gauge locomotives =

This page is a list of preserved narrow-gauge steam and other locomotives built by the Hunslet Engine Company of Leeds in England.

Many of them can be seen working at heritage railways in the UK.

== Steam locomotives ==
Year built	Works number	Wheel arr.	Gauge	Original owner	Name	Current location	Notes
1882	283	0-4-0ST	1 ft 10 3/4 in (578 mm)	Penrhyn Quarry	Charles	Penrhyn Castle Railway Museum	Penrhyn Main Line class
1883	316	0-4-0ST	2 ft (610 mm) (?)	Penrhyn Quarry	Gwynedd	Bressingham Steam Museum	Penrhyn Port Class
1883	317	0-4-0ST	1 ft 11 1/2 in (597 mm)	Penrhyn Quarry	Lilian	Launceston Steam Railway	Penrhyn Port Class
1885	364	0-4-0ST	1 ft 10 3/4 in (578 mm)	Penrhyn Quarry	Winifred	Bala Lake Railway	Penrhyn Port Class
1886	409	0-4-0ST	1 ft 11 1/2 in (597 mm)	Dinorwic Quarry	Velinheli	Ffestiniog Railway	
1889	492	0-4-0ST	1 ft 11 3/4 in (603 mm)	Dinorwic Quarry	King of the Scarlets	Statfold Barn Railway	
1889	493	0-4-0ST	1 ft 11 3/4 in (603 mm)	Dinorwic Quarry	Elidir	Llanberis Lake Railway	Previously named Red Damsel
1890	518	4-4-0T	1,000 mm (3 ft 3 3/8 in)	S.V.T. 8	FESA №1	Parc Municipal Teodor González, Tortosa (Catalonia, Spain)	FESA No 1 at Parc Municipal Teodor González 2022-10-25
1891	541	0-4-0ST	1 ft 10 3/4 in (578 mm)	Dinorwic Quarry	Rough Pup	Narrow Gauge Railway Museum, Tywyn	
1891	542	0-4-0ST	2 ft (610 mm)	Dinorwic Quarry	Cloister	Statfold Barn Railway	Donated by Hampshire Narrow Gauge Railway Trust; previously at Kew Bridge Steam Museum, Amberley Museum & Heritage Centre and Purbeck Mineral and Mining Museum
1891	554	0-4-0ST	1 ft 11 1/2 in (597 mm)	Cilgwyn quarry, then Penrhyn Quarry Railway	Lilla	Ffestiniog Railway	
1892	555	2-6-2T	3 ft (914 mm)	Tralee & Dingle Railway	No. 5T	Tralee and Dingle Light Railway	
1893	589	2-4-0ST+T	1 ft 11 1/2 in (597 mm)	Penrhyn Quarry Railway	Blanche	Ffestiniog Railway	Built as 0-4-0ST, converted to 2-4-0ST+T by FR.
1893	590	2-4-0ST+T	1 ft 11 1/2 in (597 mm)	Penrhyn Quarry Railway	Linda	Ffestiniog Railway	Built as 0-4-0ST, converted to 2-4-0ST+T by FR.
1894	605	0-4-0ST	1 ft 11 3/4 in (603 mm)	Penrhyn Quarry	Margaret	Vale of Rheidol Railway	
1894	606	0-4-0ST	2 ft (610 mm) (?)	Penrhyn Quarry	Alan George	Teifi Valley Railway	
1895	638	0-4-0ST	2 ft (610 mm)	Dinorwic	Jerry M	Hollycombe Steam Collection	
1896	624	0-4-2T	3 ft 6 in (1,067 mm)	Pioneer Sugar Mill (Queensland)	Pioneer	Burdekin Machine Preservationists group, Brandon Heritage Precinct museum, Brandon, Queensland, Australia	Undergoing Restoration as of 2017.
1896	652	0-4-0ST	1 ft 11 1/2 in (597 mm)	Groby Granite, then Dinorwic Quarry	Lady Madcap	Welsh Highland Heritage Railway	Originally named Sextus
1898	671	0-4-0ST	2 ft (610 mm)	Dinorwic Quarry	Cackler	Thursford Collection	
1898	678	0-4-0ST	2 ft (610 mm)	Dinorwic Quarry	Jonathan (formerly Bernstein)	Lytham Motive Power Museum (confirmed 2012, although museum now closed to public; was previously loaned to West Lancashire Light Railway and restored at Bala Lake Railway)	
1898	679	0-4-0ST	1 ft 11 1/2 in (597 mm)	Dinorwic Quarry	Covertcoat	Launceston Steam Railway	
1898	680	0-4-0ST	2 ft (610 mm)	Dinorwic Quarry	George B	Bala Lake Railway	
1898	684	0-4-0WT	18 in (457 mm)	John Knowles Co.	Jack	Statfold Barn Railway	
1899	704	0-4-0ST	2 ft (610 mm)	Penrhyn Quarry	Nesta	Bala Lake Railway	Returned to the UK in 2016. Privately owned.
1899	705	0-4-0ST	2 ft (610 mm)	Penrhyn Quarry	Elin	Yaxham Light Railway	Previously at the Lincolnshire Coast Light Railway.
1899	707	0-4-0ST	1 ft 11 1/2 in (597 mm)	Pen-yr-orsedd Quarry	Britomart	Ffestiniog Railway	
1901	763	0-4-0ST	1 ft 11 1/2 in (597 mm)	Dorothea Quarry	Dorothea	Launceston Steam Railway	
1902	779	0-4-0ST	2 ft (610 mm)	Dinorwic Quarry	Holy War	Bala Lake Railway	
1902	780	0-4-0ST	2 ft (610 mm)	Dinorwic Quarry	Alice	Bala Lake Railway	
1902	783	0-6-0T	1,000 mm (3 ft 3 3/8 in)	Sociedad General de Ferrocarriles Vasco-Asturiana	VA-21 Nalón	Gijón Railway Museum (Museo del Ferrocarril de Asturias), Spain	
1902	796	0-4-0ST (Built) 0-4-0E (Rebuilt)	3 ft 6 in (1,067 mm)	Mount Morgan Mining Company	No.1	Mt Morgan Mine Museum, Mount Morgan, Queensland, Australia	Converted to electric in 1951. Derelict display.
1902	797	0-4-0ST	3 ft 6 in (1,067 mm)	Mount Morgan Mining Company	No.2	Mt Morgan Railway Station, Mount Morgan, Queensland, Australia	Displayed in the station yard.
1903	822	0-4-0ST	2 ft (610 mm)	Dinorwic Quarry	Maid Marian	Bala Lake Railway	
1903	823	0-4-0ST	2 ft (610 mm) (?)	Dinorwic Quarry	Irish Mail	West Lancashire Light Railway	
1903	827	0-4-0ST	1 ft 11 3/4 in (603 mm)	Pen-yr-orsedd Quarry	Sybil	Brecon Mountain Railway	
1903	854	0-4-0ST	3 ft 6 in (1,067 mm)	Mount Morgan Mining Company	No.3	Golden Mount Rail Preservation Society Incorporated, Mt Morgan Railway Station.	Restored to operation in 1996; further overhaul began 2010.
1904	849	0-4-0ST	1 ft 11 3/4 in (603 mm)	Dinorwic Quarry	Thomas Bach	Llanberis Lake Railway	Originally named Wild Aster.
1904	855	0-4-0ST	1 ft 10 3/4 in (578 mm)	Penrhyn Quarry	Hugh Napier	Ffestiniog Railway	Owned by National Trust and previously at Penrhyn Castle Railway Museum, Gwynedd.
1905	873	0-4-0ST	2 ft (610 mm) (?)	Pen-yr-orsedd Quarry	Una	National Slate Museum, Llanberis	
1906	901	2-6-2T	1 ft 11 1/2 in (597 mm)	North Wales Narrow Gauge Railways	Russell	Welsh Highland Heritage Railway	
1906	920	0-4-0ST	2 ft (610 mm) (?)	Penrhyn Quarry	Pamela	Old Kiln Light Railway	
1906	921	0-4-0ST	2 ft (610 mm) (?)	Penrhyn Quarry	Sybil Mary	Statfold Barn Railway	
1909	994	0-4-0ST	2 ft (610 mm) (?)	Penrhyn Quarry	George Sholto	Bressingham Steam Museum	Also named Bill Harvey in preservation.
1909	996	0-4-0ST	2 ft (610 mm)	Penrhyn Quarry	Edward Sholto	Beamish Open Air Museum	Used on Beamish's narrow gauge railway
1910	1026	0-4-2T	2 ft (610 mm)	Pleystowe Sugar Mill	Seaforth	Private Site, Mackay, Queensland, Australia	Plinthed at private property and can be seen from Bucasia road.
1913	1119	0-6-0T	3 ft 6 in (1,067 mm)	Inkerman Sugar Mill	Inkerman No.1	Private Site, Burdekin, Queensland, Australia	Under Restoration.
1915	1187	0-4-2T	2 ft (610 mm)	Inkerman Sugar Mill (owned by Pioneer Sugar Mills P/L)	Torpedo	Pete's Hobby Railway, Junee, NSW, Australia	
1916	1215	4-6-0T	2 ft (610 mm)	British War Department (Australia) Invicta Sugar Mill	Invicta	War Office Locomotive Trust, Apedale Valley Light Railway, Britain, United Kingdom	, WD No.303. Operational since 2018.
1916	1218	4-6-0T	2 ft (610 mm)	British War Department (Australia) Gin Gin Sugar Mill	---	Australian War Memorial, Canberra, ACT, Australia	WD No.306. On display.
1916	1229	4-6-0T	2 ft (610 mm)	British War Department (Australia) Cattle Creek Sugar Mill	---	Australian Narrow Gauge Railway Museum Society, Woodford, Queensland, Australia	WD Number Unknown was Cattle Creek Mill No.2. In storage.
1917	1239	4-6-0T	2 ft (610 mm)	British War Department (Australia) North Eton Sugar Mill	---	Ipswich Workshops Museum, Ipswich, Queensland, Australia	WD No.327 was North Eton Mill No.4. On display.
1917	1265	4-6-0T	2 ft (610 mm)	British War Department (Israel)	---	Old Gesher Museum, Kibbutz Gesher, Israel	
1918	1312	4-6-0PT	1 ft 11 1/2 in (597 mm)	British War Department EFOP #203	---	Pampas Safari, Gravataí, RS, Brazil	
1918 or 1921?	1313	0-6-2T	3 ft 3 3/8 in (1,000 mm)	British War Department Usina Leão Utinga #1; Usina Laginha #1	---	Usina Laginha, União dos Palmares, AL, Brazil	
1918	1317	4-6-0T	2 ft (610 mm)	British War Department (Australia) Proserpine Sugar Mill	Digger	Proserpine Historical Museum Society, Proserpine, Queensland, Australia	WD Number unknown was Proserpine Mill No.7. On display.
1920	1404	0-4-0WT	18 in (457 mm)	John Knowles Co.	Gwen	Richard Farmer, Northridge, California, USA	
1922	1429	0-4-0ST	2 ft (610 mm)	Dinorwic	Lady Joan	Richmond Light Railway, Kent	Was on Bredgar and Wormshill Light Railway until 2026.
1922	1430	0-4-0ST	1 ft 11 3/4 in (603 mm)	Dinorwic Quarry	Dolbadarn	Llanberis Lake Railway	
1932	1709	0-4-0ST	1 ft 11 3/4 in (603 mm)	Dinorwic Quarry	Michael	Statfold Barn Railway	
1936	1842	0-4-2ST	2 ft (610 mm)	British Aluminium Company	Howard No. 2	Statfold Barn Railway	
1936	1844	0-4-2ST	2 ft (610 mm)	Lune River Railway Ida Bay Tramway	No.6	Don River Railway, Tasmania, Australia	Under an overhaul as of 2003.
1937	1859	0-4-2T	2 ft (610 mm) (?)	Umtwalumi Valley Estate, Natal	16 The Green Dragon	South Tynedale Railway	
1940	2075	0-4-2T	2 ft (610 mm) (?)	Chaka's Kraal Sugar Estates, Natal	Chaka’s Kraal No. 6	North Gloucestershire Railway	
1947	3398	2-6-2T	2 ft 6 in (762 mm)	Sierra Leone Government Railway	14	Sierra Leone National Railway Museum	
1954	3815	2-6-2T	2 ft 6 in (762 mm)	Sierra Leone Government Railway	14	Welshpool and Llanfair Light Railway	
1971	3902	0-4-2ST	2 ft (610 mm)	Trangkil Sugar Mill, Indonesia	Trangkil No.4	Statfold Barn Railway	Converted from 750 mm (2 ft 5 1/2 in) gauge. Last steam locomotive to be built by Hunslet, and the last industrial steam locomotive built in Britain

== Diesel locomotives ==
Year built	Works number	Wheel arr.	Gauge	Original owner	Name	Current location	Notes	Image
1939	1944	4wDM	2 ft (610 mm)	Enfield Rolling Mills		Old Kiln Light Railway	Hudson order	
1939	1963	4wDM	2 ft (610 mm)	County Borough of Burnley	21	West Lancashire Light Railway	Hudson order	
1939	1974	4wDM	1 ft 11 1/2 in (597 mm)	War Office	24	Apedale Valley Light Railway	Hudson order	
1939	2008	0-4-0DM	2 ft (610 mm)	Rossington Colliery		Leeds Industrial Museum at Armley Mills	Flameproof	
1939	2017	0-4-0DM	2 ft 6 in (762 mm)	RNAD Broughton Moor	24 Bertha	Tweeddale Heritage Railway	Flameproof	
1939	2019	0-4-0DM	2 ft 6 in (762 mm)	RNAD Broughton Moor	Sam	Statfold Barn Railway	Hudson order Flameproof	
1940	2176	4wDM	2 ft (610 mm)	COD Donnington, Shropshire	15 Olde	Great Bush Railway	Hudson order	
1941	2207	4wDM	2 ft (610 mm)	Trefor Quarry railway		Blaenau Ffestiniog	Hudson order	
1940	2239	4wDM	2 ft (610 mm)	COD Donnington, Shropshire		Cavan and Leitrim Railway, Dromod, Ireland	Rebuilt as 7340, 1972	
1940	2251	0-4-0DM	2 ft 6 in (762 mm)	RNAD Dean Hill	11 Ferret	Welshpool and Llanfair Light Railway		
1940	2254	0-4-0DM	2 ft 6 in (762 mm) regauged to 2 ft (610 mm)?		P9261	Threlkeld Quarry and Mining Museum		
1940	2266	0-4-0DM	2 ft 6 in (762 mm)	RNAD Trecwn, RNAD Broughton Moor		Sittingbourne and Kemsley Light Railway		
1941	2270	0-4-0DM	2 ft 6 in (762 mm)	RNAD Trecwn, RNAD Broughton Moor		Almond Valley Light Railway		
1941	2280	4wDM	2 ft (610 mm) regauged to 3 ft (914 mm)	COD Donnington, Shropshire		Cavan and Leitrim Railway, Dromod, Ireland		
1940	2304	4wDM	2 ft (610 mm)	War Office	3	Cavan and Leitrim Railway, Dromod, Ireland	Hudson order. Rebuilt as 7341, 1972	
1941	2400	0-4-0DM	2 ft 6 in (762 mm)	RNAD Trecwn	Scooby	Welshpool and Llanfair Light Railway	Flameproof	
1941	2463	4wDM	2 ft (610 mm)	Ministry of Defence depot, Long Marston, Warwickshire	Atlas	Statfold Barn Railway	Hudson order	
1942	2577	4wDM	2 ft (610 mm)?	Ministry of Supply		Tanfield Railway	Hudson order	
1942	2607	4wDM	2 ft (610 mm)?	Ministry of Supply	2 Ayle	Tanfield Railway	Hudson order	
1942	2659	4wDM	2 ft (610 mm)	Eastriggs	5	Cavan and Leitrim Railway, Dromod, Ireland	Hudson order	
1942	2666	4wDM	2 ft (610 mm)	Penlee Quarry railway	19 Penlee	Yaxham Light Railway	Hudson order	
1943	2763	4wDM	2 ft (610 mm)	War Office	2	Cavan and Leitrim Railway, Dromod, Ireland	Rebuilt as 7342, 1972	
1944	3097	4wDM	2 ft (610 mm)	Borough of Merton Sewage Works		Amberley Museum Railway	Hudson order	
1945	3149	0-4-0DM	2 ft (610 mm)	National Coal Board		Threlkeld Quarry and Mining Museum		
1945	3200	0-4-0DM	2 ft 8 in (813 mm)	Comrie Colliery	H881	Leeds Industrial Museum at Armley Mills	Flameproof	
1947	3411	0-4-0DM	2 ft 6 in (762 mm)	National Coal Board	20018	Astley Green Colliery Museum		
1947	3510 (prob.)	0-4-0DM	2 ft (610 mm)	National Coal Board	11	Welsh Highland Heritage Railway		
1948	3595	4wDM	2 ft (610 mm)	Laporte, Silver Band baryte mine, Great Dun Fell	Silverband	Threlkeld Quarry and Mining Museum		
1947	3621	4wDM	2 ft (610 mm)			Statfold Barn Railway	Hudson order	
1946	3646	4wDM	2 ft (610 mm)	Hall & Co. gravel pits, Sussex		Leighton Buzzard Light Railway		
1946	3653	4wDM	2 ft (610 mm)	Thakeham Tiles, Storrington	4	Amberley Museum Railway		
1948	4051	4wDM	2 ft 6 in (762 mm)			Oviedo, Spain	Hudson order	
1953	4057	0-6-0DM	3 ft (914 mm)	National Coal Board		Leeds Industrial Museum at Armley Mills	Flameproof	
1951	4059	0-6-0DM	2 ft 6 in (762 mm)	Hermitage Colliery, Lithgow, New South Wales, Australia		Rotary Park, Lithgow, New South Wales, Australia		
1955	4074	0-6-0DM	3 ft 6 in (1,067 mm)	National Coal Board	Training Loco No 2	National Mining Museum Scotland		
1952	4109	0-4-0DM	2 ft (610 mm)	National Coal Board	9	South Tynedale Railway		
1952	4110	0-4-0DM	2 ft (610 mm)	National Coal Board	2403/51	South Tynedale Railway		
1955	4113	0-4-0DM	2 ft (610 mm)	National Coal Board	Moel Hebog	Ffestiniog Railway		
1950	4136	0-4-0DM	2 ft 3 in (686 mm)	National Coal Board	9 Alf	Talyllyn Railway		
1948	4178	4wDM	650 mm	Carbones Asturianos, Spain		Gijón Railway Museum (Museo del Ferrocarril de Asturias), Spain	Hudson order	
1953	4182	4wDM	2 ft 6 in (762 mm)	Sittingbourne and Kemsley Light Railway	Victor	Sittingbourne and Kemsley Light Railway	Hudson order	
1952	4353	4wDM	2 ft (610 mm)	Twickenham Gravel Co.	Dolphin	Groudle Glen Railway, Isle of Man	Hudson order	
1952	4384	4wDM	2 ft (610 mm)	Twickenham Gravel Co.	Walrus	Groudle Glen Railway, Isle of Man	Hudson order	
1953	4478	4wDM	2 ft (610 mm)	ICI	51 Pathfinder	West Lancashire Light Railway		
1954	4524	0-4-4-0DM	18 in (457 mm)	Royal Arsenal Railway, Woolwich	Carnegie	Statfold Barn Railway		
1954	4556	4wDH	2 ft (610 mm) regauged to 15 in (381 mm)		4	Bure Valley Railway	Hudson order	
1957	5340	0-4-0DM	2 ft (610 mm)	National Coal Board		Leeds Industrial Museum at Armley Mills	Flameproof	
1963	6007	4wDM	2 ft 6 in (762 mm) regauged to 2 ft (610 mm)	Ministry of Public Building and Works	25	Apedale Valley Light Railway		
1994	6008	4wDM	2 ft 6 in (762 mm) regauged to 2 ft (610 mm)	Ministry of Public Building and Works, RNAD	Creepy	Leighton Buzzard Light Railway	Flameproof	
1961	6018	4wDM	2 ft (610 mm)	Thames Water Authority	26 Twusk	Apedale Valley Light Railway		
1961	6048	0-4-0DM	2 ft (610 mm)	National Coal Board	2	Astley Green Colliery Museum	Flameproof	
1961	6049	0-4-0DM	2 ft (610 mm)	National Coal Board		Big Pit National Coal Museum, Blaenavon		
1961	6075	4wDM	3 ft (914 mm)	St Patrick's Copper Mines, Avoca; Irish CECA		Cavan and Leitrim Railway, Dromod, Ireland		
1968	6285	4wDM	2 ft 6 in (762 mm) regauged to 2 ft (610 mm)	Millom Haematite Ore & Iron Co Ltd	5	Welsh Highland Heritage Railway		
1964	6299	4wDM	2 ft (610 mm)	Liverpool Corporation Waterworks	18/8103 LCWW	Apedale Valley Light Railway		
1975	6347	4wDH	2 ft (610 mm)	National Coal Board	Clyde	Leadhills and Wanlockhead Railway		
1975	6348	4wDH	2 ft (610 mm)	National Coal Board	Black Diamond	Woodhorn Railway		
1964	6355	0-6-0DH	2 ft (610 mm)	Doornkop Sugar Estate, South Africa		Sandstone Estates, South Africa		
1967	6646	4wDM	2 ft 6 in (762 mm) regauged to 2 ft (610 mm)	RNAD Broughton Moor	11 Cumbria	South Tynedale Railway		
1964	6651	4wDH	2 ft 6 in (762 mm)	RNAD Dean Hill	Barton Hall	Sittingbourne and Kemsley Light Railway		
1965	6659	4wDM	2 ft 6 in (762 mm) regauged to 2 ft (610 mm)	RNAD Dean Hill	Moel y Gest	Ffestiniog Railway		
1971	7010	4wDH	2 ft (610 mm)	Eastriggs	35	Statfold Barn Railway	Rebuilt by Barclay	
1971	7011	4wDM	2 ft (610 mm)	Lydd Ranges	36 Champion	Old Kiln Light Railway		
1971	7012	4wDM	2 ft (610 mm)	Lydd Ranges	37 Wey Valley	Old Kiln Light Railway	Rebuilt by Barclay	
1971	7013	4wDM	2 ft (610 mm)	Lydd Ranges	38 Weyfarer	Old Kiln Light Railway		
1971	7178	4wDH	2 ft (610 mm)	The Dredging & Construction Co Ltd, King's Lynn; Hoveringham Gravel, Holme Pierrepont, Notts		Golden Valley Light Railway at Midland Railway – Butterley	Unique Husky prototype	
1974	7195	4wDM	2 ft (610 mm)	Yorkshire Water Authority, North Bierley sewage works	Harold	Ffestiniog Railway		
1973	7330	4wDM	2 ft 6 in (762 mm)	ROF Bishopton	Scruffy	Almond Valley Light Railway		
1961	7375	4wDM	2 ft (610 mm)	National Coal Board	Roger Bowden	Astley Green Colliery Museum	Flameproof	
1977	7519	4wDH	2 ft (610 mm)	National Coal Board	Calverton No 9	Astley Green Colliery Museum		
1981	8515	Bo-BoDM	2 ft 6 in (762 mm)?	National Coal Board	B03	Bowes Railway	Barclay 651	
1978	8561	4wDH	2 ft (610 mm)	National Coal Board	Gordon	Amerton Railway	Flameproof	
1978	8575	0-6-0DM	2 ft 6 in (762 mm)	National Coal Board		Astley Green Colliery Museum	Flameproof	
1978	8577	0-6-0DM	2 ft 6 in (762 mm)	National Coal Board		Astley Green Colliery Museum	Flameproof	
1978	8812	4wDH	2 ft (610 mm)	National Coal Board		Cefn Coed Colliery Museum		
1981	8816	4wDH	3 ft (914 mm)	National Coal Board		Doon Valley Railway, Dunaskin - Waterside, East Ayrshire		
1979	8819	4wDH	3 ft (914 mm) regauged to 2 ft (610 mm) then regauged again in 2021-12 to 2 ft 6 in (762 mm)	Nantgarw Colliery		Gunpowder Railway		
1979	8827	4wDM	1 ft 11 1/2 in (597 mm)	ROF Bishopton	57 TOE RAG 3	Apedale Valley Light Railway		
1979	8828	4wDM	2 ft 6 in (762 mm)	ROF Bishopton	57 TOE RAG 4	Gunpowder Railway		8828
1979	8829	4wDM	2 ft 6 in (762 mm)	ROF Bishopton	57 TOE RAG 5	Gunpowder Railway		
1978	8832	4wDH	2 ft 3 in (686 mm)	National Coal Board	Caphouse Flyer	National Coal Mining Museum for England	Flameproof	
1978	8834	4wDH	2 ft (610 mm)	National Coal Board	Mole	Astley Green Colliery Museum	Flameproof	
1981	8847	0-6-0DM	2 ft 6 in (762 mm)	John Summers & Sons steelworks, Shotton, Flintshire	Tom	Statfold Barn Railway	Hudswell Clarke D1447	
1979	8909	4wDH	2 ft (610 mm)	National Coal Board	Lionheart	Astley Green Colliery Museum	Flameproof	
1980	8969	4wDH	2 ft (610 mm)	ROF Bishopton	12	Amberley Museum Railway		
1982	9056	4wDM	2 ft (610 mm)	National Coal Board	16/6 Margaret	Apedale Valley Light Railway	Flameproof	
1984	9080	4wDM	1 ft 11 1/2 in (597 mm)	ROF Bishopton	15	Gunpowder Railway		
1984	9082	4wDM	1 ft 11 1/2 in (597 mm)	ROF Bishopton	56 CAT.C 13	Apedale Valley Light Railway	Flameproof	
1986	9227	Bo-BoDH	3 ft (914 mm)	National Coal Board	Ellington Colliery No. 9	Bowes Railway	Flameproof	
1991	9294	4wDH	3 ft (914 mm)	British Coal, Stillingfleet Mine, Yorkshire		Statfold Barn Railway	Flameproof	
1994	9332	4wDH	2 ft (610 mm)	Jan-Pan, Singapore		Statfold Barn Railway		
1994	9336	4wDH	2 ft (610 mm) regauged to 12 1/4 in (311 mm)	Hire to Balfour Beatty Amec Joint Venture for London Underground Jubilee Line Extension construction	Eddy	Exbury Gardens	Rebuilt by Exmoor Steam Railway	
1994	9337	4wDH	2 ft (610 mm) regauged to 15 in (381 mm)	Hire to Balfour Beatty Amec Joint Venture for London Underground Jubilee Line Extension construction	Jubilee	Perrygrove Railway		
1994	9338	4wDH	2 ft (610 mm)	Jan-Pan, Singapore	Spelthorne	Kempton Steam Railway		
1994	9342	4wDH	3 ft (914 mm)	Hire to McAlpine, Wayss & Freytag, Bachy Joint Venture for London Underground Jubilee Line Extension construction	18 Ailsa	Isle of Man Railway		
1994	9346	4wDH	2 ft (610 mm)	Hire to Balfour Beatty Amec Joint Venture for London Underground Jubilee Line Extension construction	Emma	Welsh Highland Heritage Railway		
1994	9347	4wDH	2 ft (610 mm)	Hire to Balfour Beatty Amec Joint Venture for London Underground Jubilee Line Extension construction	Peter Wood	Leighton Buzzard Light Railway		
1994	9348	4wDH	2 ft (610 mm)	Hire to Balfour Beatty Amec Joint Venture for London Underground Jubilee Line Extension construction	Mennock	Leadhills and Wanlockhead Railway		
1994	9349	4wDH	2 ft (610 mm)	Hire to Balfour Beatty Amec Joint Venture for London Underground Jubilee Line Extension construction	Col. Frederick Wylie	Ffestiniog Railway		
1994	9350	4wDH	2 ft (610 mm)	Hire to Balfour Beatty Amec Joint Venture for London Underground Jubilee Line Extension construction	Kathy	Welsh Highland Heritage Railway		
1994	9351	4wDH	2 ft (610 mm)	Hire to Balfour Beatty Amec Joint Venture for London Underground Jubilee Line Extension construction; later Lower Lea Valley Cable Tunnels construction		Statfold Barn Railway	Last Leeds-built loco	

== Electric locomotives ==
Year built	Works number	Wheel arr.	Gauge	Original owner	Name	Current location	Notes	Image
1990	9423	4wBE	900 mm (2 ft 11 7/16 in)	Channel Tunnel construction	RA36	National Railway Museum, York	Part of the UK National Collection	
