= Old Kiln Light Railway =

British heritage railway

Coordinates: 51.1836°N 0.7746°W

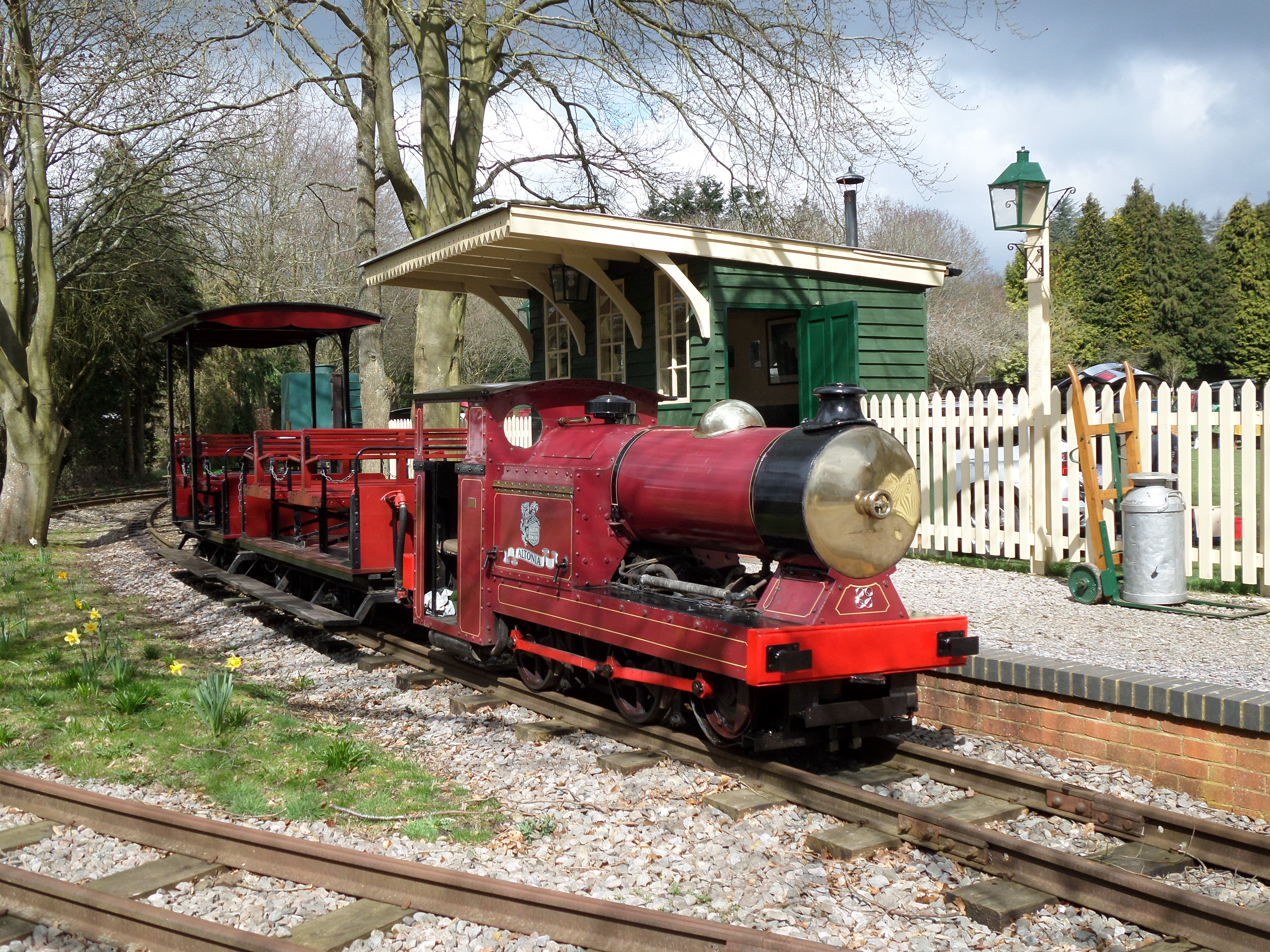
- "Altonia" at Reeds Road, 5 April 2015
- Locale: England

Preserved operations
- Length: 0.5 miles (0.8 km)
- Preserved gauge: 2 ft (610 mm)

The Old Kiln Light Railway is a 2 ft (610 mm) narrow gauge railway at the Rural Life Living Museum in Tilford, near Farnham, Surrey. It has a collection of historic locomotives and rolling stock including two steam locomotives. It operates on most weekends in the summer and occasionally certain midweek days during school half term.

== History ==
Founded in the early 1970s as a heritage Wey Valley Light Railway, it was first located around a disused pumping station in Farnham. In 1982 the land was sold for housing and the track and equipment were moved to the Old Kiln Museum, now known as the Rural Life Centre. The line has since lengthened around the centre and a small stretch of track serves the museum's heritage timber yard demonstration area.

== Stations ==
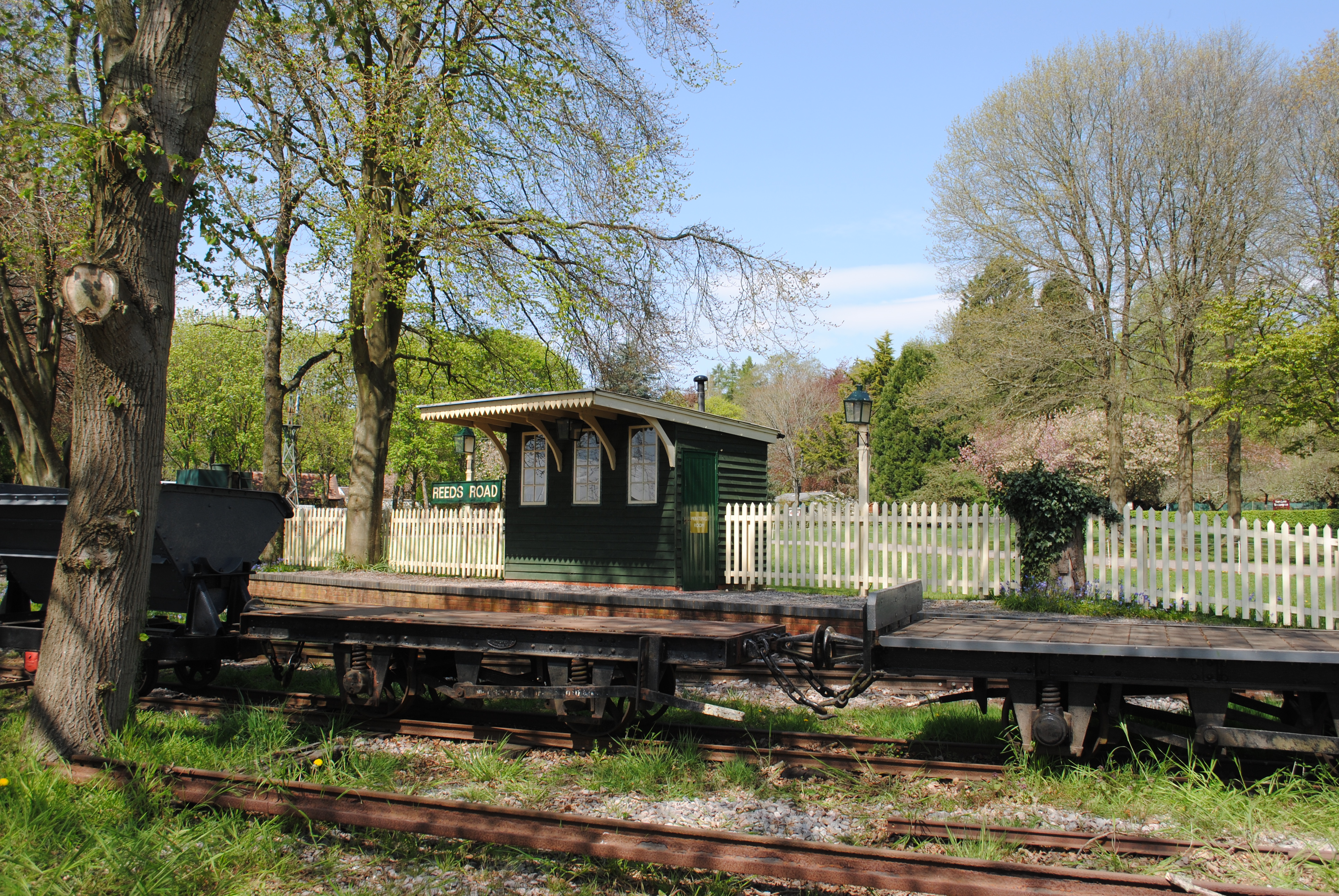
Reeds Road station on 22 April 2019

The railway has four stations: Reeds Road, Old Kiln Halt, Oatlands and Mills Wood.

Reeds Road was built in 2003 to replace a sleeper-built platform, is the south-western terminus, has a passenger waiting room, a run-round loop and a siding for storing rolling stock.

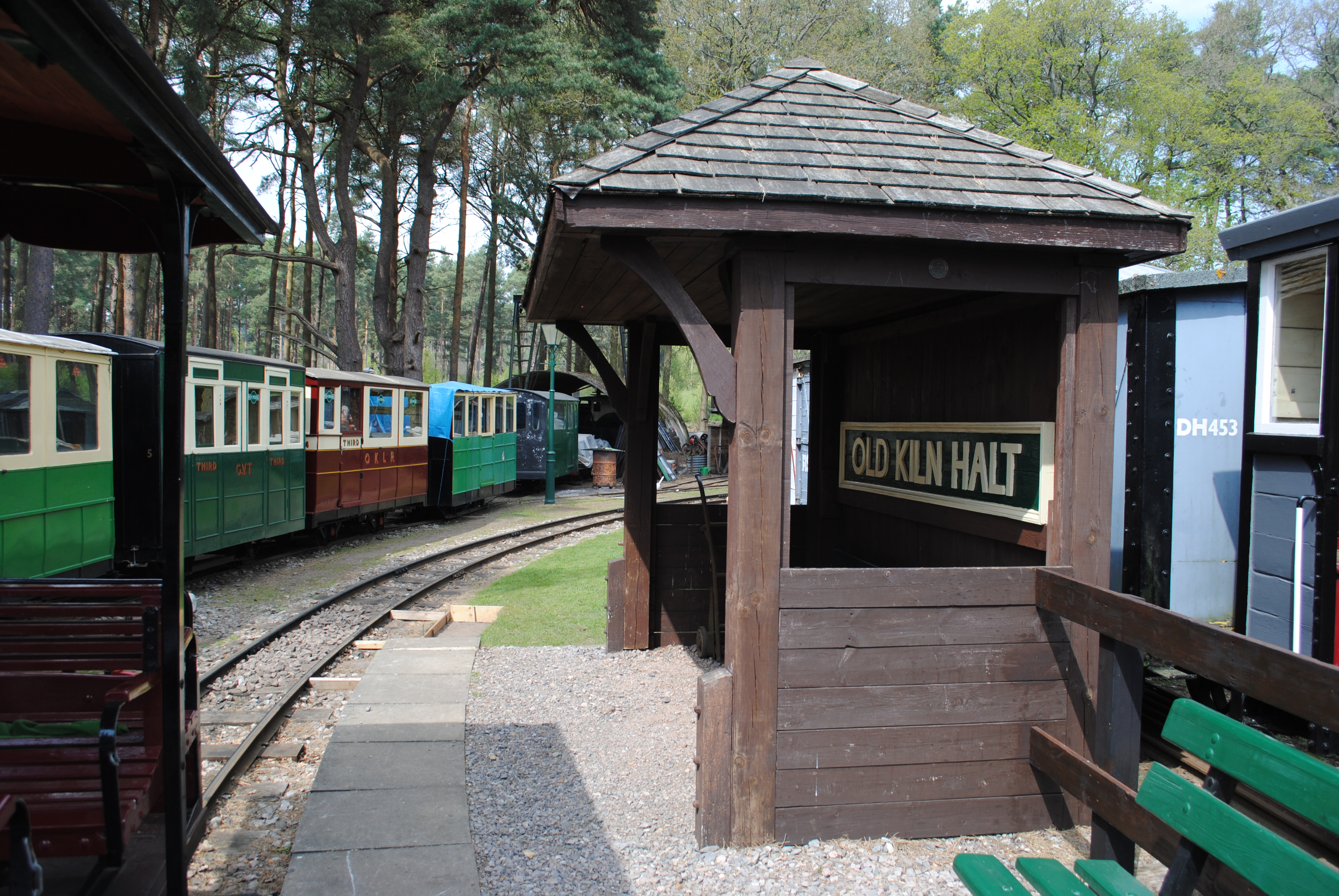
Old Kiln Halt on 22 April 2019

Old Kiln Halt is where the locomotive works and carriage sheds are located, along with further storage sidings. The platform at this station is currently not open for public use.

Oatlands was the far terminus of the line until extension to Mills Wood. It has a platform with a small waiting room with a stove. It is located behind the museum's playground and is sometimes used as the passenger boarding point during events. It was previously named "Waverley End Station".

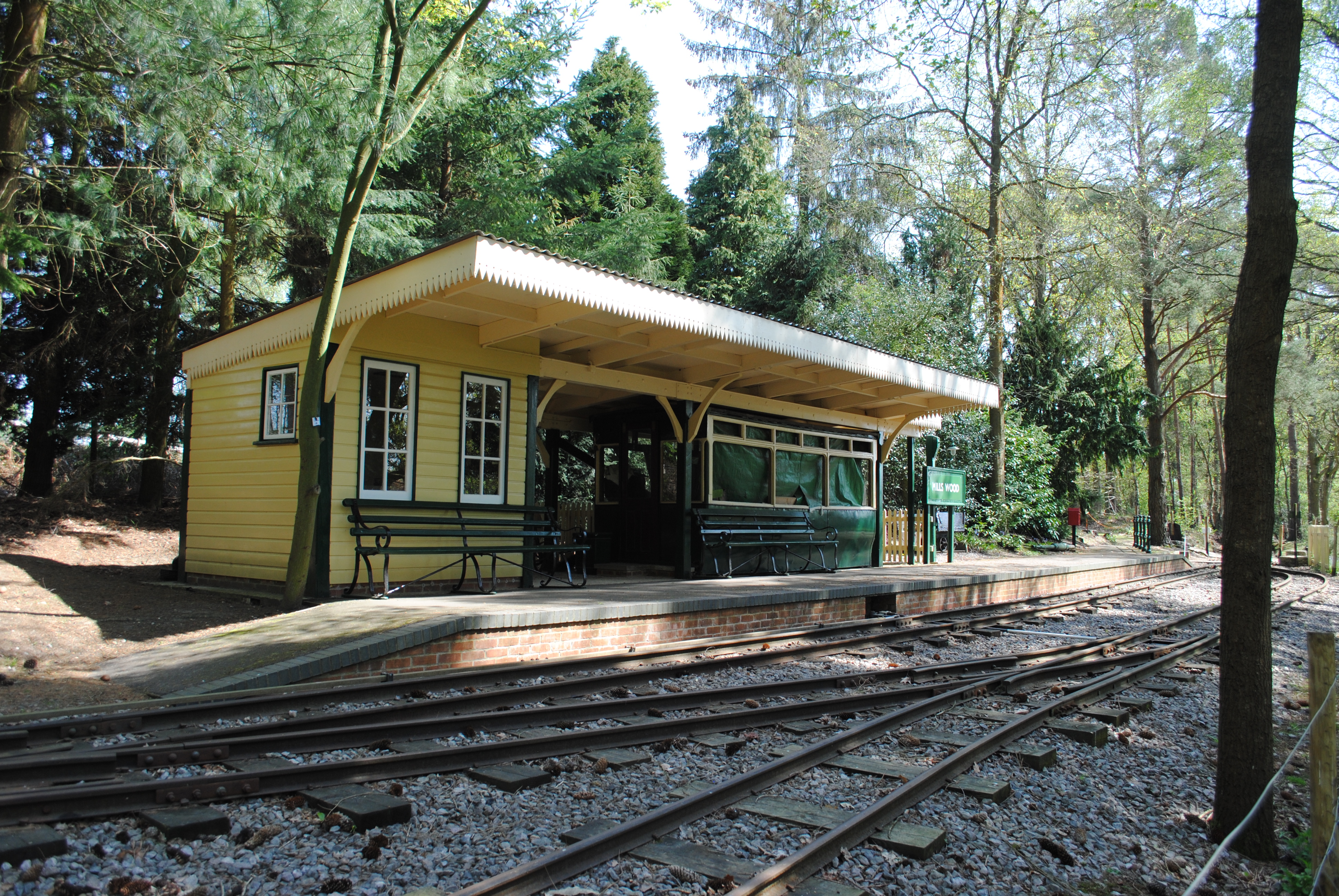
Mills Wood station on 22 April 2019

Mills Wood is the other terminus of the line, on the north-east side of the Rural Life Centre. It has a waiting room partly built from the body of an old Portsdown and Horndean Light Railway passenger tram, a run-round loop and a branch connection to the woodyard. Passengers typically board trains here on normal running days.

== Steam locomotives ==
Name	Builder	Works No	Built	Whyte notation	Notes	Photograph
Pamela	Hunslet	920	1906	0-4-0ST	Rebuilt by Penrhyn Quarry in 1950s, resulting in unique appearance. Requires a new boiler before it can return to service.	
Elouise	Orenstein & Koppel	9998	1922	0-6-0WT	Supplied new to Servicios` Florestais, Portugal.	
Emmet	Jim Haylock		2005	0-4-0T	Currently on loan from The Moors Valley Railway. This loco was constructed using the frame of a 1937 O&K diesel loco.	

== Internal combustion locomotives ==
Name	Builder	Works No	Built	Fuel	Whyte notation	Notes	Photograph
Altonia	Baguley	1769	1928	Diesel	0-4-0DH	Supplied new to the Lilleshall Abbey Woodland Railway. Moved to the Alton Towers Park Railway in 1952. Purchased for preservation by a private owner in 2002 and moved to Surrey. Sold in 2010, and then permanently loaned to the OKLR in 2012.	
	Motor Rail	8981	1946	Diesel	4wDM	Midhurst Whites. Purchased by OKLR in 1986. Re-gauged from 2 ft 6 in (762 mm) to 2 ft (610 mm).	
Amey	Motor Rail	7902	1939	Diesel	4wDM	Built in 1939 for ICI Murex Ltd, Rainham Essex. 1970s moved to Llanberis Lake Railway, laying cables for Dinorwig Power Station. 1980s to Brecon Mountain Railway. 1991 to Alan Keef Ltd hire fleet. 1996 to LEGOLAND Windsor. February 2025 to OKLR. Left site for overhaul at Alan Keef Ltd between November 2025 and April 2026.	
	Motor Rail	9655	1951	Diesel	4wDM	Built in 1951 for R. Fielding & Son's Warbreck Hill Brickworks in Blackpool. Early 1960s sold to G.W Bungey before being sold on to J&A Jackson, Manchester. Saw use at J&A Jackson's Windmill Lane Brickworks & Bredbury Brickworks. Sold 1971 to Henry Oakland's Escrick Tile Works near York. 1981 entered preservation at North Ings Farm. Sold to OKLR in 1985. Sold 1986 to Stevington & Turvey Light Railway. Sold to OKLR Member November 2022, making it the only locomotive that has been at the railway twice.	
Phoebe	Motor Rail	8887	1944	Diesel	4wDM	Built in 1944 for the Ministry of Defence. It is unknown where it first worked, as locomotive movements between military bases during World War 2 were not recorded, however by 1952 Phoebe had been allocated to the British Army of the Rhine in Arsbeck, Germany. 1980 returned to England, moved to Shoeburynes Proof & Experimental Establishment in Essex. Finally moved to Lydd Ranges before being sold into preservation in 1987. Moved to OKLR 1990.	
Eagle	Motor Rail	5713	1936	Diesel	4wDM	Supplied to the Staveley Coal and Iron Company Campbell Brickyard. Moved to Stanton & Staveley Concrete Pipe works in Ilkeston in 1968. Purchased by Alan Keef, then sold to Brian Gent in 1980 and moved to the Wey Valley Railway. Moved to the OKLR in 1982.	
	Motor Rail	5297	1931	Petrol	4wPM	Ordered 1931 by Surrey County Council for River Wey Navigation Joint Improvement Scheme. Sold 1934 to Thomas Patterson for use at their Weydon Lane Sandpits, Farnham. 1950 moved to Nursing Mill Gravel Pits, Southampton. 1955 sold to Coates Brothers, Giles Lane Sand and Gravel Pit, Plaitford. 1973 Preserved by Island Narrow Gauge Group, Isle of Wight Albany. 1976 to Great Bush Railway. 1977 to Mold, North Wales. 1983 to Old Kiln Light Railway.	
Sandrock	Ruston & Hornsby	177639	1936	Diesel	4wDM	Supplied to the County Borough of Derby.	
Red Dwarf	Ruston & Hornsby	181820	1936	Diesel	4wDM	Ex-Severn Trent Water Authority.	
	Hibberd	2528	1941	Diesel	4wDM	War Department, Ministry Of Defense, Liphook.	
	Hudson Hunslet	1944	1939	Diesel	4wDM	Supplied new in 1939 to Enfield Rolling Mills. 1976-1982 was used in the restoration of the Basingstoke Canal.	
Champion	Hunslet	AD36	1971	Diesel	4wDH	Ex-Lydd Ranges in Kent.	
Wey Valley	Hunslet	AD37	1971	Diesel	4wDH	Ex-Lydd Ranges in Kent. Rebuilt in 1988 by Andrew Barclay.	
Weyfarer	Hunslet	AD38	1971	Diesel	4wDH	Ex-Lydd Ranges in Kent.	
Liz	Wickham	3031	1941	Petrol	4wPM	Rebuilt in 1973 by Jim Haytor from an unmanned target trolley with a single cylinder Petter engine.	
Sue	Wickham	2981	1941	Petrol	4wPM	Rebuilt by E.J. Stephens in 1977 from unmanned target trolley with an 850cc Reliant engine	

== Coaches ==
Origin	Number	Type	Build date	Notes	Photograph
Lilleshall Light Railway	1	Open carriage	1928	Lilleshall line closed upon the outbreak of WWII. Later sold to Alton Towers in March 1953 and was there until purchased in 1996, then went to OKLR in 1999. A roof was fitted in 2015. Operational.	
Lilleshall Light Railway	2	Open carriage	1928	Lilleshall line closed upon the outbreak of WWII. Later sold to Alton Towers in March 1953 and was there until purchased in 1996, then went to OKLR in 1999. Operational.	
Old Kiln Light Railway	3	Open Carriage	1989	Replica of type used at Penrhyn Quarries that were used on works trains. Operational.	
East Hayling Light Railway	4	4-wheel third	1996	Built at Mill Rythe Workshop on the EHLR as No. 6. It was purchased from the East Hayling Light Railway in 2008. Operational. Painted red and cream.	
Old Kiln Light Railway	5	4-wheel third	Unknown	This coach was originally a side-tipping stone wagon, purchased by the OKLR and converted into a passenger carriage. Replica carriage of a Glyn Valley Tramway third. Operational.	
East Hayling Light Railway	7	4-wheel brake	1996	Built at Mill Rythe Workshop. Requires overhaul. Painted green and cream when bought but now cosmetically refurbished to crimson and cream. Purchased from the Great Bush Railway.	

== Wagons ==
Origin	Number	Type	Notes	Photograph
East Hayling Light Railway	10	Brake Van	Build date unknown. Purchased from the EHLR as a mobile ticket office, later converted into a brake van. Operational and used on most passenger services.	
Allens	101	Manrider	Built 2023 from Allens Skip Chassis. Personnel transporter for works trains. Operational.	
Hudson	102	Flat	Built 2024 from various spare parts. Flat type wagon for P-Way use.	
RNAD Dean Hill	DH 417	Fish Van	Build date and manufacturer unknown. Was in service at RNAD Dean Hill, hence the 'DH'. Regauged from 2 ft 6 in (762 mm). Design is similar to that of two MoD vans at the MRC.	
RNAD Dean Hill	DH 453	Covered goods van	Build date and manufacturer unknown. Was used at RNAD Dean Hill, hence the 'DH'. Regauged from 2 ft 6 in (762 mm). Design is similar to that of two MoD vans at the MRC. One of the doors has been removed and filled in for the time being.	
RNAD Dean Hill	DH 132	Brake van	Built 1943 by Chas Roberts & Co. Later used at RNAD Dean Hill, hence the 'DH'. Regauged from 2 ft 6 in (762 mm).	
RNAD Dean Hill	DH 323	1 Plank Flat Wagon	Built at an unknown date. Ex-RNAD Dean Hill. Sides of wagon removed, common practice with RNAD wagons.	
RNAD Dean Hill	DH 178	Flat Wagon		
RAF Fauld	C104	Steel Sided Dropside	Original body removed. Painted in a grey livery with white lettering.	
RAF Chilmark	C50	2 Plank End Door	Original body removed. Ballast wagon.	
RAF Chilmark	C108	Flat	Painted in 1930s Military Green	
RAF Chilmark	C69	Dropside		
RAF Chilmark	C91	Flat	Painted MOD Grey	

== Awards ==
The OKLR received the "Surrey Industrial History Group Conservation" award in 1994
