= Wales West Light Railway =

Tourist Railway in Alabama

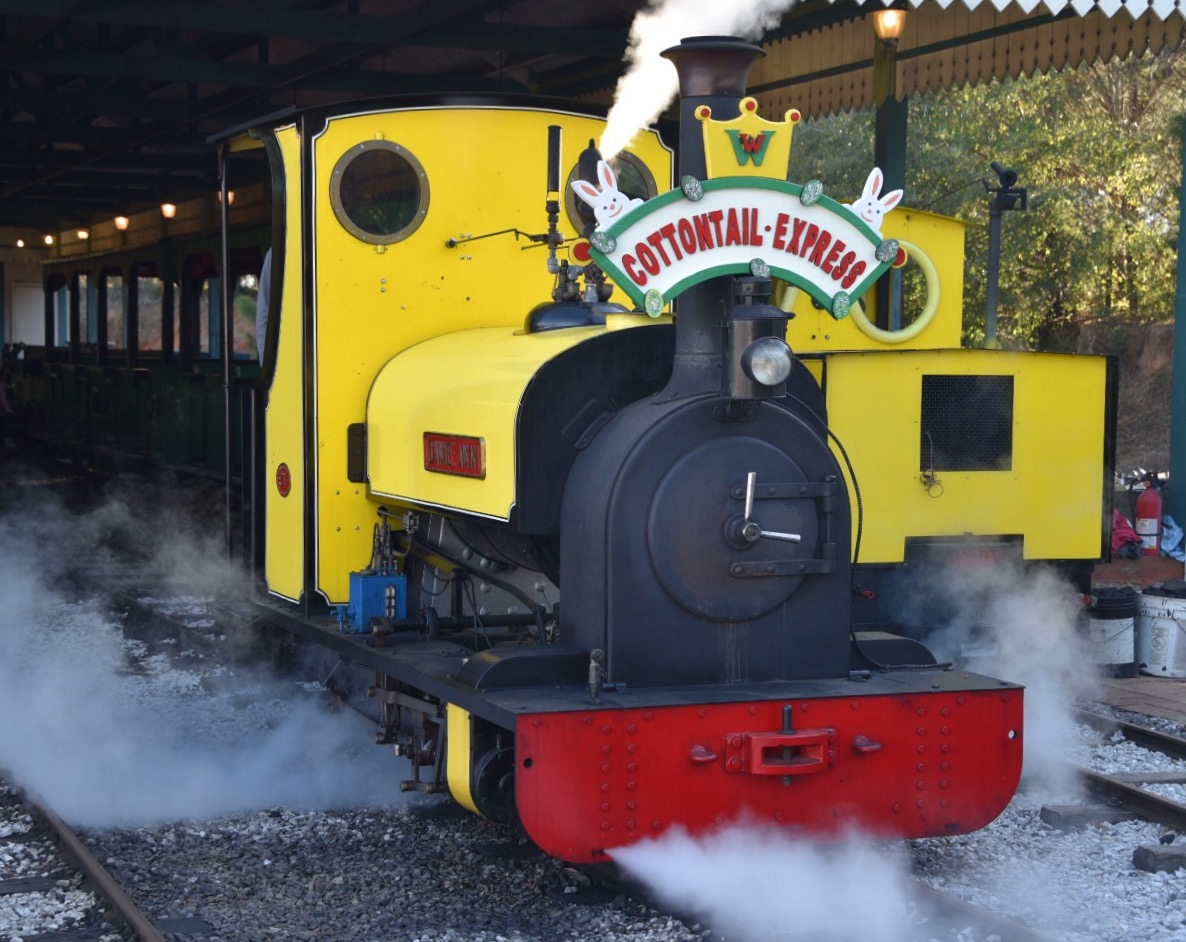

Overview
- Locale: 30°30′10″N 87°47′13″W; Silverhill, Alabama
- Dates of operation: 2001–present

Technical
- Track gauge: 2 ft (610 mm)
- Length: 1.6 kilometres (1 mi)

Other
- Website: Wales West Light Railway

The Wales West Light Railway is a 1.6-kilometre (1 mi) 2 ft (610 mm) narrow gauge tourist railway in Silverhill, Alabama owned by Ann and Ken Zadnichek. It is built to simulate a Welsh narrow gauge railway. The railway also operates a shorter 7.5" gauge miniature ridable railway. The railway and associated RV park host over 30,000 visitors annually.

== Rolling stock ==
=== Locomotives ===
==== Dame Ann ====
Steam locomotive Dame Ann in the line's main sheds in November 2026, having been recently refurbished.

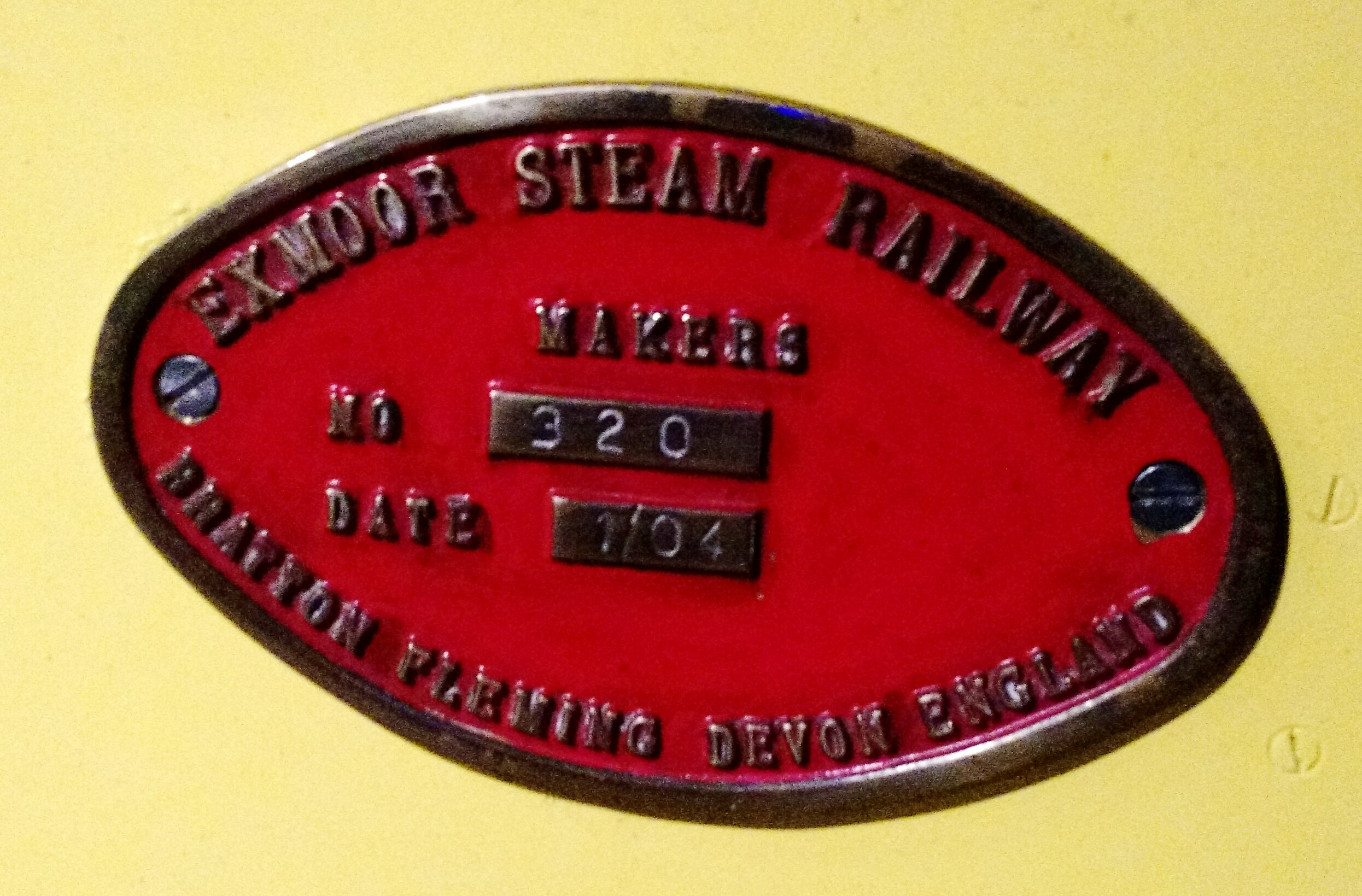
Dame Ann Exmoor Steam Railway builder's plate showing year of completion and works number.

Smokebox of the Dame Ann locomotive.

Dame Ann is an 11,700-pound 0-4-2ST steam locomotive built by Exmoor Steam Railway in Bratton Fleming, England. Her steam trials were completed at the Launceston Steam Railway in Cornwall. She was delivered to the Wales West Light Railway in 2004. Dame Ann is based on the Penrhyn Port Class locomotive built by Hunslet Engine Company in the 19th century. At the time of her construction, she was the first Port Class Hunslet engine built in 83 years.

==== Gareth ====
Diesel locomotive Gareth, built by Motor Rail Ltd. in the sheds at Wales West Light Railway in Silverhill, Alabama, USA, in November 2026.

Gareth is a Simplex 40S diesel locomotive built by British locomotive building company Motor Rail in the mid-1960s. The two thousand pound locomotive was purchased from Alan Keef Ltd for use in the construction of the Wales West Light Railway. Gareth originally featured steam out-line body and had been used to pull a single car train in Scotland. His new owners replaced the steam out-line body with a body modeled after the Simplex-type diesels produced by Alan Keef in the 1980s.

==== Huey ====
Diesel locomotive Huey, built in-house in 2018, resting at the main platform in November 2026.

Huey is an diesel locomotive used on the railway. He was built in-house in 2018.

=== Passenger cars ===
Passenger cars on the Wales West Light Railway are replicas based on plans dating to the 19th century. They are built of wood over steel frames with wheels imported from England, and are equipped with modern air brakes.
