= List of Welsh Highland Railway Ltd rolling stock =

This is a list of the rolling stock of the Welsh Highland Railway Limited which is used to operate the Welsh Highland Heritage Railway, a 1 ft 11 1/2 in (597 mm) narrow gauge heritage railway line in Porthmadog, North Wales. The line opened in 1980. The railway owns Russell - the only remaining original Welsh Highland locomotive, and a number of historically important coaches.

== Locomotives ==
=== Steam locomotives ===
No.	Name	Wheel arrangement	Date built	Builder	Works No.	Image	Notes
	Russell	2-6-2T	1906	Hunslet	901		The only surviving original WHR engine. Returned to steam following overhaul in August 2014, and now hauling regular trains alongside Gelert (as of November 2020).
	Karen	0-4-2T	1942	Peckett and Sons	2024		Stored out of traffic on display in the shed. The first steam engine to haul a passenger train on the line.
	Gelert	0-4-2T	1953	Bagnall	3050		Returned to service in April 2018 at the Statfold Barn Railway following overhaul there. The overhaul included a new boiler being constructed. Returned to the WHHR in July 2018 and has now started hauling regular passenger trains alongside Russell.
	Lady Madcap	0-4-0ST	1896	Hunslet	652		Was dismantled in the 1950s and the parts were moved to Gelert's farm for reconstruction. New mainframes manufactured but as yet no boiler or tank.
	590	4-6-0PT	1917	Baldwin	794		Baldwin Class 10-12-D imported from India, original number 794 but renumbered 590 to replace the original, scrapped WHR locomotive. Restored at the Vale of Rheidol Railway and entered service in May 2023.

=== Diesel locomotives ===
No.	Name	Wheel arrangement	Date built	Builder	Works No.	Image	Notes
1	Glaslyn	4wDM	1952	Ruston & Hornsby	297030		Heavily modified over the years, very little remains of the original 48DL apart from the chassis and gearbox. Fitted with a 6cyl engine with fluid flywheel in place of the original 4 cylinder. Indicated as operable in 2020.
2	Kinnerly	4wDM	1953	Ruston & Hornsby	354068		Named after the old WHR 1964 depot in Shropshire, Kinnerly hauled the first trains on the reopened WHR in 1980. The loco is still mostly original but has had the 'telephone box' cab removed. Very occasionally used as a mobile compressor for visiting locos to operate the WHR's airbraked stock.
4	Simplex No 4	4wDM	1966	Motor Rail Simplex	60S333		Originally operated by Pilkingtons Glass. Worked in sand quarries.
6	Simplex No 6	4wDM	1959	Motor Rail Simplex	11102		Originally operated by Pilkingtons Glass. Previously named Jonathan.
9	Simplex No 9	4wDM	1968	Motor Rail Simplex	60S363		Originally operated by Pilkingtons Glass. Previously named Katherine.
58		0-6-0DH	1977	23rd August Works	23387		350 hp Class Lyd2 imported from Poland in 1995. Originally operated by PKP on the Jarocin Railway as Lyd2-58.
60	Eryri	0-6-0DH	1977	23 August Works	23389		350 hp Class Lyd2 imported from Poland in 1993. Originally operated by PKP on the Jarocin Railway as Lyd2-60.
69		0-6-0DH	1980	23 August Works	24051		350 hp Class Lyd2 imported from Poland in 1993. Originally operated by PKP on the Jarocin Railway as Lyd2-069.
	Emma	4wDM		Hunslet	9346		Used in construction of Jubilee line. Indicated as operable and main diesel engine in 2020.

=== Electric locomotives ===
No.	Name	Wheel arrangement	Date built	Builder	Works No.	Image	Notes

=== Former locomotives ===
No.	Name	Wheel arrangement	Date built	Builder	Works No.	Image	Notes
4	Sezela No. 4	0-4-0T	1915	Avonside Engine Company	1738		Worked at the Sezela Sugar Mill in Natal, South Africa until 1971, when it was brought back to the UK. It was restored at the Knebworth Park and Winter Green Railway where it ran until the early 1990s. It was purchased in 1993 and moved to the line where it was returned to steam in 1997. In 2006 it was moved to the Leighton Buzzard Light Railway
	Moel Tryfan (now Isaac)	0-4-2T	1953	Bagnall	3023		Sister loco to Gelert and allocated the name Moel Tryfan but never carried nameplates. After many years awaiting restoration, it was revealed in February 2008 that it has been sold to a private owner. Now restored and named Isaac it worked for a while on the Lynton and Barnstaple Railway at Woody Bay. but is now at Statfold Barn.
	Beddgelert	2-8-2	1949	Société Anglo-Franco-Belge	120		Ex-SAR NG15 Class. Sold in 2007, and moved offsite for restoration. Now at Darnall Trust
	Gertrude	0-6-0T	1918	Andrew Barclay	1578		Steamed on the railway for several years before moving to the Leighton Buzzard Light Railway in early 2019.
	The Coalition	0-4-0OE	1890, rebuilt 1930	Bagnall	1278		Rebuilt from 0-4-0ST steam locomotive. Undergoing cosmetic restoration. Originally worked at Llechwedd Slate Mines near Blaenau Ffestiniog. This locomotive has now left the railway and is on display at Statfold Barn.
	The Eclipse	0-4-0OE	1895, rebuilt 1927	Bagnall	1445		Rebuilt from 0-4-0ST steam locomotive. Undergoing cosmetic restoration. Originally worked at Llechwedd Slate Mines near Blaenau Ffestiniog. This locomotive has now left the railway and is on display at Statfold Barn.

== Coaches ==
All coaches are bogie vehicles unless otherwise stated.

No.	Date built	Builder	Body Type	seats	Image	Notes
2	1902	Midland Railway Carriage and Wagon Company rebuilt in 1938 by GWR.	brake van	0		Ex. G.W.R. Vale of Rheidol Railway four-wheeled van, sold by British Rail 1968.
6	1995	WHR Ltd.	Saloon	12		Bodywork mounted on modified RNAD four-wheeled flat wagon No. 69. Previously numbered 4.
7	1987	WHR Ltd.	Fully glazed saloon with tables	32		'The Eisteddfod Coach' Coachwork mounted on a modified Hudson bogie chassis. Carriage had been taken out of service in November 2013 until March 2014 for major reconstruction of the floor.
8 (later 29)	1891	Metropolitan Carriage & Wagon Co.	Central glazed saloon with open balcony at each end	24		'The Gladstone Car' Ex North Wales Narrow Gauge Railways recovered 1988 and restored by WHR Ltd.
9 (later 25)	2010	Stanegate Restorations and Replicas Ltd	Fully glazed saloon	33		Replica of original 1893 carriage.
10 (later 23)	1893	Ashbury Carriage and Wagon Co Manchester	Fully glazed saloon	33		'The Buffet Car' This carriage was initially given the number "23" in the combined FR/WHR stock list. However, there is documentary evidence that the carriage was formally identified as "No. 24" in 1936. It appears that this number change occurred in 1926 when the WHR exchanged one of their Ashbury "Summer" carriages (No 24) with the FR in return for three bogie coal wagons. The carriage was modified by the WHR in 1927 to serve as a buffet car, a service which operated until 1929. It was recovered in 1987 and restored by Stanegate Restorations and Replicas Ltd and WHHR ltd with its first run in the heritage train on 2 May 2009.
42	1924	Hudson	open toast rack	24		Three open unglazed compartments. One of six original bogie toast racks built by Hudson for use on the WHR and FR. Completely rebuilt by WHR Ltd.

=== Former coaches ===
No.	Date built	Builder	Body Type	seats	Image	Notes
1	1973	WHR Ltd.	saloon/brake	20		Observation and Brake end car with central glazed saloon and part-glazed observation compartment. Coachwork mounted on a modified Hudson bogie chassis. Sold to the Teifi Valley Railway in 1998.
3	1980	WHR Ltd.	open toast rack	18		Three open unglazed compartments. Bodywork mounted on a modified Hudson bogie chassis. Sold to a private Railway in Hampshire in March 2010.
5	1913	Waggonfabrik Wismar				Chassis of Deutsche Reichsbahn bogie coach awaiting new body. No. 960-104 imported 1972. Returned to Germany in August 2009.
6	1981	WHR Ltd.	semi-open part-glazed toast rack	18		Three compartments. Bodywork mounted on a modified Hudson bogie chassis. Sold to the Amerton Railway

== Wagons ==
	Wh.	Builder	Description	From
1	8	Hudson	Rail bolster , ex bogie wagon	RAF Fauld
2	8	Hudson	Bogie wagon, steel, drop side, 4 ton capacity	RAF Fauld
3	8	Hudson	Rail bolster , ex bogie wagon	RAF Fauld
4	8	Hudson	Bogie wagon, steel, drop side, 4 ton capacity	RAF Fauld
5	8	Hudson	Bogie wagon, steel, drop side, 4 ton capacity	RAF Fauld
6	8	Hudson	Bogie wagon, steel, drop side, 4 ton capacity	RAF Fauld
7	8	Hudson	Bogie wagon, steel, drop side, 4 ton capacity	RAF Fauld
8	8	Hudson	Bogie wagon, steel, drop side, 4 ton capacity	RAF Fauld
9	8	Hudson	Bogie wagon, steel, drop side, 4 ton capacity	RAF Fauld
10	8	Hudson	Bogie wagon, steel, drop side, 4 ton capacity	RAF Fauld
11	8	Hudson	Bogie wagon, steel, drop side, 4 ton capacity	RAF Fauld
12	8	Hudson	Bogie wagon, steel, drop side, 4 ton capacity	RAF Fauld
13	8	Unknown	Mines Rescue van , seats 8, includes tool storage & small kitchen	RAF Fauld
16	4	Unknown	Small trolley	-
17	4	Unknown	Small trolley	-
18	4	Unknown	Heavy trolley	-
19	4	Unknown	Small bolsters	-
20	4	Unknown	Small bolsters	-
21	4	Hudson	steel, drop side wagon, 2 ton capacity	RAF Fauld
22	4	Hudson	steel, drop side wagon, 2 ton capacity	RAF Fauld
23	4	Hudson	wooden, drop side wagon, 2 ton capacity	-
24	4	Hudson	wooden, drop side wagon, 2 ton capacity	-
25	4	Hudson	wooden, drop side wagon, 2 ton capacity	-
26	4	Hudson	Rail bender , ex 4 wheel wooden drop side wagon	-
27	4	Hudson	Weed-killer Tank , ex-wooden drop side wagon 2 ton capacity	RAF Chilmark
30	4	Unknown	Medium trolley	-
31	4	Unknown	Medium trolley	-
32	4	Unknown	Medium trolley	-
33	4	Unknown	Medium trolley	-
Unnumbered	4	Unknown	Medium trolley	-
Unnumbered	4	Unknown	Medium trolley	-
34	4	Unknown	Skip chassis	-
35	4	Unknown	Skip chassis	-
36	4	Hudson	Skip wagon	-
37	4	Hudson	Skip wagon	-
38	4	Hudson	Skip wagon	-
39	4	Hudson	Skip wagon	-
40	4	Hudson	Skip wagon, end tipper	-
41	4	Cravens	Flat wagon (*)	RNAD Broughton Moor
42	4	Cravens	Flat wagon (*)	RNAD Broughton Moor
43	4	Cravens	Flat wagon (*)	RNAD Broughton Moor
44	4	Cravens	Flat wagon (*)	RNAD Broughton Moor
45	4	Cravens	Flat wagon (*)	RNAD Broughton Moor
46	4	Cravens	Generator van , box van (*)	RNAD Ensettle
47	4	Unknown	Box van (*)	RNAD Ensettle
48	4	Pickering	Box van (*)	RNAD Trecwn
49	4	Chaz Roberts	Box van (*)	RNAD Trecwn
53	4	Unknown	Flat wagon (*)	RNAD Trecwn
54	4	Unknown	Flat wagon (*)	RNAD Trecwn
55	4	Unknown	Flat wagon (*)	RNAD Trecwn
56	4	Unknown	Flat wagon (*)	RNAD Trecwn
57	4	Unknown	Flat wagon (*)	RNAD Trecwn
58	4	Unknown	Box van (*)	RNAD Trecwn
59	4	Cravens	Simplex parts store , box van (*)	RNAD Dean Hill
60	4	Cravens	Simplex parts store , box van (*)	RNAD Dean Hill
61	4	Unknown	Environmental dept , box van (*)	RNAD Trecwn
62	4	Unknown	Box van (*)	RNAD Trecwn
65	4	Cravens	Brake van (' The Fighting Brake '!) (*)	RNAD Trecwn
68	4	Cravens	Brake van (*)	RNAD Trecwn
69	4	Chaz Roberts	Now coach No. 4	RNAD Trecwn
70	4	Unknown	Tool van , box van (*)	RNAD Dean Hill
71	4	Unknown	Box van (*)	RNAD Trecwn
