= Knebworth Park and Winter Green Railway =

Railway line in Hertfordshire, England

Coordinates: 51.972°N 0.212°W

Knebworth and Winter Green Railway
Overview
- Headquarters: Stevenage
- Locale: England
- Dates of operation: 1971–1990
- Successor: Knebworth Park Railway

Technical
- Track gauge: 1 ft 11 1/2 in (597 mm)
- Length: 1 1/2 miles (2.4 km)

The Knebworth and Winter Green Railway was a 1 ft 11 1/2 in (597 mm) narrow gauge railway built in the grounds of Knebworth House in 1972 as a tourist attraction.

The railway was built by Pleasurerail Ltd. a company set up to build and operate private tourist railways which included the Great Whipsnade Railway and also the line at Blenheim Palace. In 1971, they started construction on a railway in the grounds of Knebworth House near Stevenage. The initial line was an end-to-end layout running from the house to the adventure playground. In 1980, the track was extended to form a mile-long continuous loop.

During its existence, the line hosted a number of steam and diesel locomotives. The line continued to run until 1990 when it was lifted and the remaining stock transferred to other lines

== Locomotives ==
These are the locomotives that stayed at Knebworth for extended periods. Not all ran there at the same time and the exact dates when they were present are not always known.

| Name | Builder | Works No. | Built | Type | Operating period | Notes |
|---|---|---|---|---|---|---|
| Triassic | Peckett | 1270 | 1911 | 0-6-0ST | on site 1979 | Now at the Bala Lake Railway |
| Sezela No. 4 | Avonside | 1738 | 1915 | 0-4-0T | Arrived in 1972 | Now at the Leighton Buzzard Light Railway |
| No. 1 | Hunslet | 1429 | 1922 | 0-4-0ST | Arrived in 1972 | Now named Lady Joan and at the Bredgar and Wormshill Light Railway |
| Lilla | Hunslet | 554 | 1891 | 0-4-0ST | Arrived in 1972 | Now on the Ffestiniog Railway. |
| Sezela No. 2 | Hunslet | 1720 | 1915 | 0-4-0T | | Now in the private collection of Nick Williams. |
| Sao Domingos | Orenstein & Koppel | 11784 | 1925 | 0-6-0WT | on site 1979 | Static display only at Knebworth. Moved to South Tynedale Railway in 1980. Now restored to working order at the Great Bush Railway |
| Pedemoura | Orenstein & Koppel | | | 0-6-0WT | | Now at the Leighton Buzzard Light Railway after spending many years at the Welsh Highland Heritage Railway |
| No.3 | Motor Rail | 8717 | 1941 | 4wDM | On site 1987 | Dismantled and converted into a brake van |
| No. 6 Horatio | Ruston & Hornsby | 217967 | 1942 | 4wDM | On site 1987 | Moved first to the Stoke Place Railway in Buckinghamshire, then to the Devon Railway Centre. |
| No.4 | Motor Rail | 8995 | 1946 | 4wDM | On site 1987 | Dismantled and converted into a brake van |
| No. 2 | Motor Rail | 21513 | 1955 | 4wDM | On site 1987 | |
| No.5 Sir Tom | Motor Rail | 40S273 | 1966 | 4wDM | On site 1987 | Moved first to the Stoke Place Railway in Buckinghamshire, then to the Devon Railway Centre. |

== See also ==
- British narrow gauge railways
