= Hayling Seaside Railway =

Narrow-gauge railway in England

Coordinates: 50.7815°N 0.9668°W

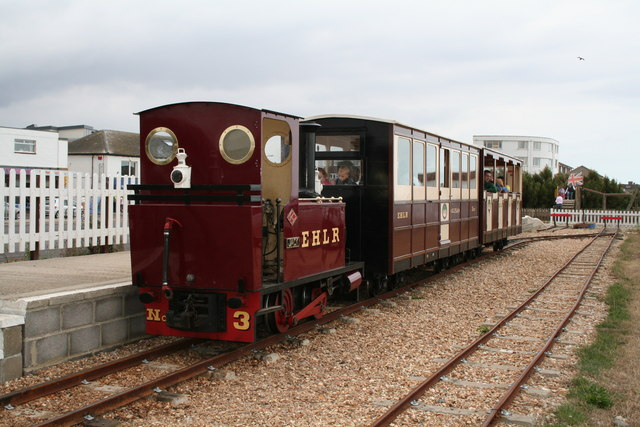
- 'Jack' at the Hayling Seaside Railway (photo by Chris Rogers)

Overview
- Dates of operation: 2003–Present

Technical
- Track gauge: 2 ft (610 mm)
- Length: 1.1 miles (1.8 km) (roughly)

Other
- Website: Hayling Railway Official Website

The Hayling Seaside Railway, formerly East Hayling Light Railway, is a 2 ft (610 mm) narrow gauge railway on Hayling Island, Hampshire, England. It is mainly a diesel operated railway, though from time to time the railway hires steam locomotives from other narrow gauge railways. It operates passenger trains between Beachlands and Eastoke Corner.

== History ==
The Hayling Seaside Railway began life as the East Hayling Light Railway (EHLR), formed by Bob Haddock, a member of the society who in the mid-1980s attempted to reinstate the "Hayling Billy" Line. Havant Borough Council had already decided to turn the disused railway line into a cycle-way and footpath which precluded any chance of rebuilding the line as standard gauge, the option preferred by the committee of the society. Some members including Haddock decided to create their own railway elsewhere on Hayling Island and after numerous setbacks, a site was found within the Mill Rythe Holiday Camp where the EHLR was constructed and ran successfully for many years. Havant Council took the step of including a railway in their draft plan for Hayling's popular Pleasure Beach. Haddock submitted a plan for a narrow gauge railway to meet the Council's criteria, but the council refused planning permission. After a campaign lasting over 12 years, permission to build the railway was granted, but only after the Council's decision was overturned by the Department of the Environment.

Following the closure of the EHLR at Mill Rythe, work started in October 2001 on the building of Beachlands Station on land leased from the neighbouring Funland Amusement Park. Work continued through 2002 and into 2003 and the line finally opened to passengers on 5 July 2003, re-christened as "The Hayling Seaside Railway". As of 2006 there was a mile of track in place and it was planned to extend it to the ferry terminal connecting the island with Portsmouth so providing a useful transport link. However, in 2015 the Portsmouth to Hayling ferry was withdrawn from operation due to the owners becoming bankrupt so this extension looks doubtful.

In the early part of 2015, after a lengthy period of campaigning for the local authority work started on a new depot at Eastoke Corner as the lease on the depot at Beachlands had run out. As of February 2018, the railway runs out of the new Eastoke Corner depot.

In September 2019, the owners (Mr & Mrs Haddock) put the business up for sale by lease or outright purchase, in regard to their wishes to retire and travel.

== Stock list ==
=== Locomotives ===
Number	Name	Builder	Works Number	Built	Wheel Arrangement	Notes	Image
1	Alan B	Motor Rail	7199	1937	4wDH	Built for the Ibstock Brick Company at their Wormley and Hambledon brick works. Originally named Ace at Hayling.	
3	Jack	Alan Keef	23	1988	0-4-0DH		
4	Alistair	Ruston & Hornsby	201970	1940	4wDM	Initially preserved on the Festiniog Railway, then based at the Gartell Light Railway. Entered service at Hayling in 2005. As of 2021 located at Statfold Barn Railway.	
5	Edwin	Ruston & Hornsby	7002-0967-5	1967	4wDM	An LB class Ruston, built for the South Western Tunnelling and Mining Company at Bodmin. Entered service at Hayling in 2007.	

=== Coaches ===
- 1 L Class coach named Lisa
- 3 M Class coaches named Mavis, Michelle & Marilyn

=== Wagons ===
- 2 tippers
- 3 open sided 3-5 plank wagons
- 1 tanker
- 1 brakevan

== See also ==
- British narrow gauge railways
- Hayling Island branch line
