= W. H. Dorman & Co =

- Industry: Engineering
- Founded: 1870
- Defunct: 1961
- Headquarters: Stafford, England
- Key people: William Henry Dorman
- Products: Machinery, Engines

W. H. Dorman & Co was a company formed by William Henry Dorman in 1870 making cutting tools for the footwear industry. It diversified into other tools including grinders, and in 1903 into internal combustion engines. This was to be its main product up to the point where it was taken over by the English Electric Company in 1961, though the Dorman name continued as a diesel engine trademark until 1995 (from 1968 under the ownership of the General Electric Company plc, and later by Broadcrown Ltd). William Henry Dorman retired in 1911, and died in 1926.

== Origins ==
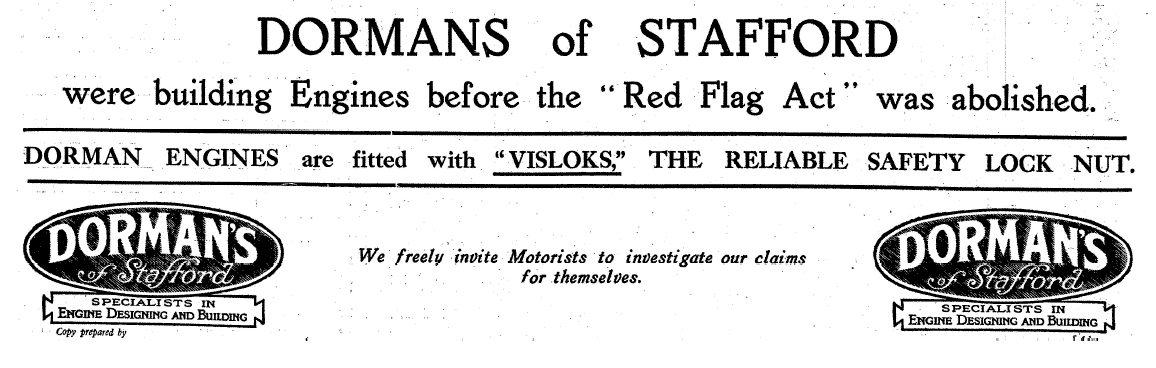
1919 Dormans Engines Advertisement

The early origins of W. H. Dorman & Co were documented in a centenary booklet, marking the history of Dorman from 1870 to 1970. These were handed out to all employees and visitors to Dorman Diesels. Extracts from the centenary booklet have been reproduced on the Dorman Association website.

When the company was first formed it was to make sole and heel cutting knives for the local footwear industry. Within a few years this diversified into a wide range of machinery for industry, as well as the first refrigeration plant for the Smithfield meat market in London. Around 1897 the part of the business devoted to the footwear industry was sold off to the British United Shoe Machinery Co, and the business directed its efforts more towards printing, grinding, and knitwear machines. However, by 1903 they made their first internal combustion petrol engines and petrol-paraffin engines, and gradually engine manufacture was to become their main business. However, William Henry Dorman was a prolific inventor and between 1894 and 1914 there are 72 patents to his name, many related to the mechanisation of the manufacture of footwear, but also on diverse topics such as the trouser press, four-wheel-drive motor cars, and a method for separating cream from milk. Apart from the engines that were later to dominate the business, a great many other products were made, many of which were equipment for manufacturing industry.

Factory records of the engine production exist from 1913, starting with engine number 701, however information on the engines produced from 1903 to 1912 is missing. Reports in the press in 1912 stated that Dorman had been manufacturing engines for 3 different well-known car manufacturers, and that following their purchase of the Redbridge Aero Works of Southampton, they had just entered into aero-engine manufacture with a V8 engine of 60-80hp designed by Mr W.L. Adams. One of these engines was sent to Brooklands to be tested in a Percival biplane in July 1912, and a brief account stated it was flown in August 1912.

The Dorman Association shows that from 1913 the JJ and JO engines were available in either 2-cylinder or 4-cylinder form, each with the same 110 mm bore and 140 mm stroke and with 8 bhp per cylinder. It is known that the 4-cylinder Dorman engine was fitted into the Pagefield trucks made by Walker Brothers of Wigan in 1913 to a War Department specification. In November 1913 Dorman were advertising that their 4-cylinder engine was awarded a "Special Certificate in the War Office Subsidy Trials". This same advert lists a 2-cylinder water-cooled motor with 80 mm bore and 108 mm stroke, and other adverts from March and April 1914 show other engines were available. A Dorman engine powered the Caledon lorries from 1915 to 1919.

The Dorman Engineering Co of Northampton is sometimes confused with W. H. Dorman & Co. The principal partner there was Thomas Phipps Dorman (son of Mark Dorman), and the main product was the Dorman sewing machine, though they started manufacturing engines and made the Whirlwind motor cycle for a few years before failing in 1903. The motor manufacturing equipment, still relatively new, was auctioned off complete with 10 engines of 2 to 3hp in March 1903. This coincides with the start of engine manufacture at W. H. Dorman, but no commercial or familial link has as yet been identified between the two companies.

== First World War ==
The Dorman 2-cylinder (2JO) and 4-cylinder (4JO) engines were the only engines selected for the internal combustion 'rail tractors' used on the War Department Light Railways, these being made by Motor Rail (20 hp and 40 hp variants) with 2-speed gearboxes, and the 40 hp 4JO was used in the petrol-electric locomotives made by Dick, Kerr & Co. and British Westinghouse. After the war many of these rail tractors were overhauled and sold in the UK (some rebuilt onto standard gauge), and as a result many survive and a few of them still have the original Dorman engine.

Dorman also made engines for marine use, and the 1917 'Red Book' lists a range of marine petrol engines that could be run on paraffin by specifying the addition of a "Haddon Patent Paraffin Vaporiser" at extra cost. The listed engines were:

- A 2-cylinder engine of 6 hp at 800rpm with 80mm bore and 108mm stroke. Weight 198 lb
- 3 of 4-cylinder engines, of 30 to 35 hp at 800rpm, stroke being 5.5inch, bore being 4.33in(30 hp), 4.5in(32 hp), 4.75in(35 hp). Weight 992 lb
- 3 of 6-cylinder engines, of 45 to 55 hp at 800rpm, stroke being 5.5inch, bore being 4.33in(45 hp), 4.5in(50 hp), 4.75in(55 hp). Weight 12.5cwt

== Inter War Years ==
Dorman continued as engine supplier to Motor Rail for peacetime variants of the rail tractors, which became known as Simplex locomotives. Initially these used the same 2JO and 4JO petrol engines, though later they adopted Dorman-Ricardo diesel engines.

1919 saw an expansion in the range of engines, and diversification in the applications, including the Ruston & Hornsby car (models A1 and B1), which was produced until the mid-1920s. The Vulcan car of the 1920s also was available with a Dorman engine, and several other cars of very limited production used Dorman engines in the 1920s. The Dorman 4JO engines was also used in the new model 1922 40 hp Clayton & Shuttleworth 'chain-rail' crawler tractors. Their previous model, which had been made throughout the war, had a 35 hp rating, though it is not clear if these were also Dorman-engined. These crawler tractors were used for towing Handley-Page bombers, and later used by the RNLI.

In 1930 Dorman introduced their first diesel engine, the RB, and from then on all new engines up to World War 2 were diesels. At the time of its introduction Dorman listed 19 different petrol engines from 8.5 to 100 bhp. This new twin-cylinder 4-stroke diesel used an Acro air-cell combustion head. The bore and stroke were 110mm and 180mm, giving a capacity of 3420cc, and it used Bosch 'solid' fuel injection.

From 1932 the diesel engines were changed to use Ricardo style heads, and referred to as Dorman-Ricardo engines. Large numbers of these engines were used in early diesel trucks, either fitted to new chassis, or for the conversion of existing petrol engines trucks. Production of Dorman-Ricardo marine and transport engines, mainly 4- or 6-cylinder units was to continue up to the war, at about which time Dorman introduced direct injection engines. Dorman started work on a V8 engine (model VRM) in 1938.

Thornycroft were one of the truck manufacturers using Dorman engines in the 1930s, with the 4DS fitted into the Bullfinch 4-ton 4-wheeler, and the larger 4JUR specified for the Steadfast 4-ton truck.

== Second World War ==
Dorman continued production through the war, with most engines moving to direct injection, and in 1942 were listed as producing 8 different marine diesel engines with 2,3,4 or 6 cylinders (production of the V8 may have been suspended), and a range of 5 road transport engines of 4 or 6 cylinders.

== Post-War ==
By 1949 Dorman was no longer making engines for road transport, and their range focussed on marine and industrial engines. The marine engines were by this time all direct injection, with the exception of the V8 VRM engine which had been further developed during the war, but still used Ricardo heads and was rated at 100 hp at 2300 rpm.

While almost all engine production was diesel engines, Dorman did make a petrol engine – the 1AB 800 cc 4-stroke single that was used in the Aveling-Barford calfdozer (a small bulldozer). There was also a twin-cylinder version, the 2AB. Production was from the mid-1940s into the 1950s.

After the war, businesses favoured who exported, and Dorman was very successful. By 1952, 85% of its production was either directly or indirectly exported.

In 1953 the new 'L' series engines were launched with the LA. These were a new design of engine dating back to 1946, with maximum interchangeability of parts. The largest single order for these engines was from Canada for hundreds of engines to drive radar stations situated along the 69th parallel. In 1957 the 'Q' series engines were launched, with an in-line 6-cylinder and V8 and V12 engines. Surviving engines are often found in emergency generator rooms, and this appears to have been one of the main markets for these engines, though they were also to be found in fishing boats. In 1959, Dorman merged with the neighbouring factory of W. G. Bagnall.

== Acquisition ==
In 1961, with full order books, W. H. Dorman was acquired by English Electric Ltd. and became their Dorman Engines Division. Dorman diesels continued to be produced, and in 1964 the 'DA' range of engines was added alongside the existing 'Q' and 'L' series engines. The 'DA' had applications for snow-blowers, grain-dryers and compressors. Under English Electric Ltd some of the smaller Ruston diesel designs came under the Dorman Engine Division, and in 1969 36 different diesel engines were listed from 5.5 bhp to 910 bhp, 4 of which were Ruston designs. These were subdivided into the following application areas:

- Industrial - with prime applications being pumping sets and earthmoving equipment
- Marine Auxiliary - for winches, bow thrusters, compressors, heating lighting, navigation aids, and pumps
- Marine Propulsion - for tugs, dredgers, lifeboats, fishing boats, pilot vessels and a wide range of other craft
- Generating Sets - both for continuous use, but especially for emergency generators for hospitals, telecomms and other uses from 3 to 572 kW
- Dorman Traction - use in industrial railway shunters

Dorman was acquired by GEC c. 1970 and became the wholly owned subsidiary Dorman Diesels Ltd. Their market declined through the 1970s and early 1980s and in 1987 GEC sold the business to Broadcrown Ltd. Broadcrown was a generator company that had been formed by David and Frank Borgman, two ex-Dorman employees. Broadcrown attempted to diversify into marine engines sold, but their main output remained generators. In 1994 the business was sold to Perkins Engines, who dropped the Dorman name in 1995.

In 2010 the rights to the older (non SE series) engines was acquired from Perkins by Lincoln Diesels Ltd, a part of the Diesel and Marine Group of companies. Lincoln Diesels also acquired Perkins' stock of non SE series spares. Lincoln Diesels Ltd revived the Dorman Diesels name and supplies new parts for the older engines and complete engines on an exchange basis from their works in Lincoln.
