= Launceston Steam Railway =

Narrow gauge railway operating from the town of Launceston, Cornwall

Coordinates: 50.641°N 4.365°W

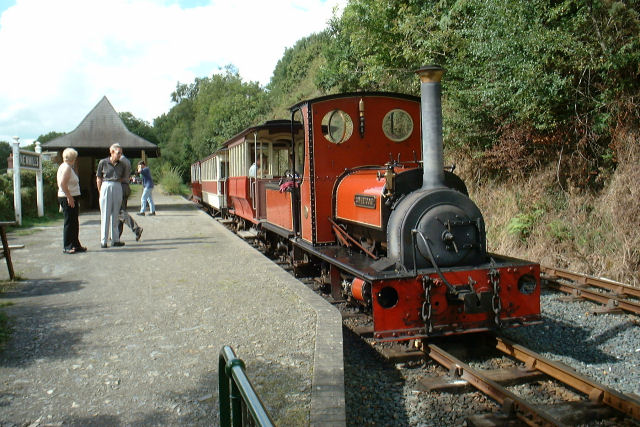
- Locale: Launceston, Cornwall, UK
- Terminus: Launceston

Commercial operations
- Name: North Cornwall Railway
- Original gauge: 4 ft 8 1/2 in (1,435 mm) standard gauge

Preserved operations
- Owned by: The Spice Settlement Trust Co. Ltd
- Operated by: The Spice Settlement Trust Co. Ltd
- Stations: 4
- Length: 2 1/2 miles (4 km)
- Preserved gauge: 1 ft 11 1/2 in (597 mm)

Commercial history
- Opened: 21 July 1892
- Closed: 30 January 1967

Preservation history
- 1965: Steam locomotive Lilian rescued
- 1983: Launceston Steam Railway opened
- 1995: Extension to Newmills opened

The Launceston Steam Railway is a 1 ft 11 1/2 in (597 mm) gauge narrow gauge railway, in Cornwall, England. The 2 1/2 miles (4.0 km) long railway runs from Launceston to Newmills, where there is a farm park. It is built on the trackbed of the former standard gauge North Cornwall Railway.

== History ==
=== Standard gauge railway ===
The first railway to reach Launceston was the Launceston and South Devon Railway, opened in 1865 from Launceston to Plymouth, and later absorbed into the Great Western Railway. In 1886 the London and South Western Railway opened its railway from Halwill Junction, extended to Padstow in stages in the 1890s, and later part of the Southern Railway. The two Launceston stations were side by side: the Great Western closed in 1962 and the Southern in 1966.

=== Narrow gauge revival ===
In 1965, Nigel Bowman, a trainee teacher, rescued the steam locomotive Lilian from the Penrhyn Slate Quarry in North Wales, and restored her to working order at his home in Surrey. He then set about looking for a site to build a railway for Lilian to run on, and settled on Launceston in 1971, after considering a stretch of trackbed from Guildford to Horsham and the Lynton and Barnstaple Railway. Purchase of the trackbed took several years, and the first 1/2 mile (0.8 km) of track opened on Boxing Day 1983. Permission to operate the railway was granted by the Launceston Light Railway Order 1982 (SI 1982/1621). The railway was extended progressively, the latest opening to Newmills in 1995 bringing the line to its current 2 1/2-mile (4 km) length.

== Route ==
The LSR starts at a new station just west of the original LSWR station, which is now an industrial estate. Launceston station is the main station on the railway, and the sheds and engineering facilities are located here. The line runs from the station through a cutting, passing under a road bridge and aqueduct carrying a mill leat, before crossing the River Kensey on a two-arch viaduct. The line is now on an embankment and crosses a bridge over a farm track before arriving at Hunt's Crossing, where it is planned to lay a passing loop. After Hunt's Crossing the line crosses two farm crossings and then reaches Canna Park which was the temporary terminus before the extension to Newmills. From Canna Park there is a fairly short run to Newmills, the terminus. Adjacent to the Newmills station is the Newmills Farm Park.

== Locomotives ==
All public train services are operated by the steam locomotives, whilst the internal combustion locomotives are used for maintenance work.

=== Steam locomotives ===
Number	Name	Builder	Type	Works Number	Built	Origin	Notes
	Lilian	Hunslet Engine Company	0-4-0ST+T	317	1883	Penrhyn Quarry	New boiler fitted in 1993 and tender added in 2008. Overhauled 2016
	Covertcoat	Hunslet Engine Company	0-4-0ST+T	679	1898	Dinorwic Quarry	Cab and tender added at Launceston
	Dorothea	Hunslet Engine Company	0-4-0ST	763	1901	Dorothea Quarry	Restored over 22 years by Kay Bowman, first steamed in November 2011 and entered passenger service in 2012.
89	Perseverance	C. Parmenter	4wVBT		2004		Originally constructed on a Hudson wagon chassis, rebuilt with a new chassis in 2010

=== Internal combustion and battery electric ===
Number	Name	Builder	Type	Works Number	Built	Origin	Notes
38		English Electric	2w-2-2-2wRE	761	1930	Post Office Railway	On display in the museum
		Motor Rail	4wDM	5646	1933	Grove Heath, Ripley, Surrey	
		N. Bowman	4wBE		1986		Inspection trolley
		Launceston Steam Railway	4wDE		2004		Inspection trolley
	The Gherkin	Launceston Steam Railway	0-4-4-0DER		2010-17		New build diesel railcar

=== Visiting locomotives ===
Number	Name	Builder	Year Visited	Location	Notes
	Lilla	Hunslet	1998	Ffestiniog Railway	
	Pearl 2	A. Civil	2001	Golden Valley Light Railway	
	Dame Ann	Exmoor Steam Railway	2004	Wales West Light Railway, Alabama	
19		Sharp Stewart	2009 & 2019	Beeches Light Railway	Darjeeling Himalayan Railway 778
	Gertrude	Andrew Barclay Sons & Co.	2009	Exmoor Transport	
	Lyd	Boston Lodge Works	2010	Ffestiniog Railway	
		Roanoke Engineering	2010 & 2011	Private	Vertical boilered tram locomotive

== Rolling stock ==
The railway has four passenger carriages, all built on site and based on those built for the Manx Electric Railway, Torrington and Marland Railway and the Plynlimon and Hafan Tramway. There are also several ex. Royal Naval Armaments Depot box vans, slate wagons and tipping wagons.
