= Almond Valley Light Railway =

Heritage railway line in Scotland

Coordinates: 55°53′07″N 3°32′55″W

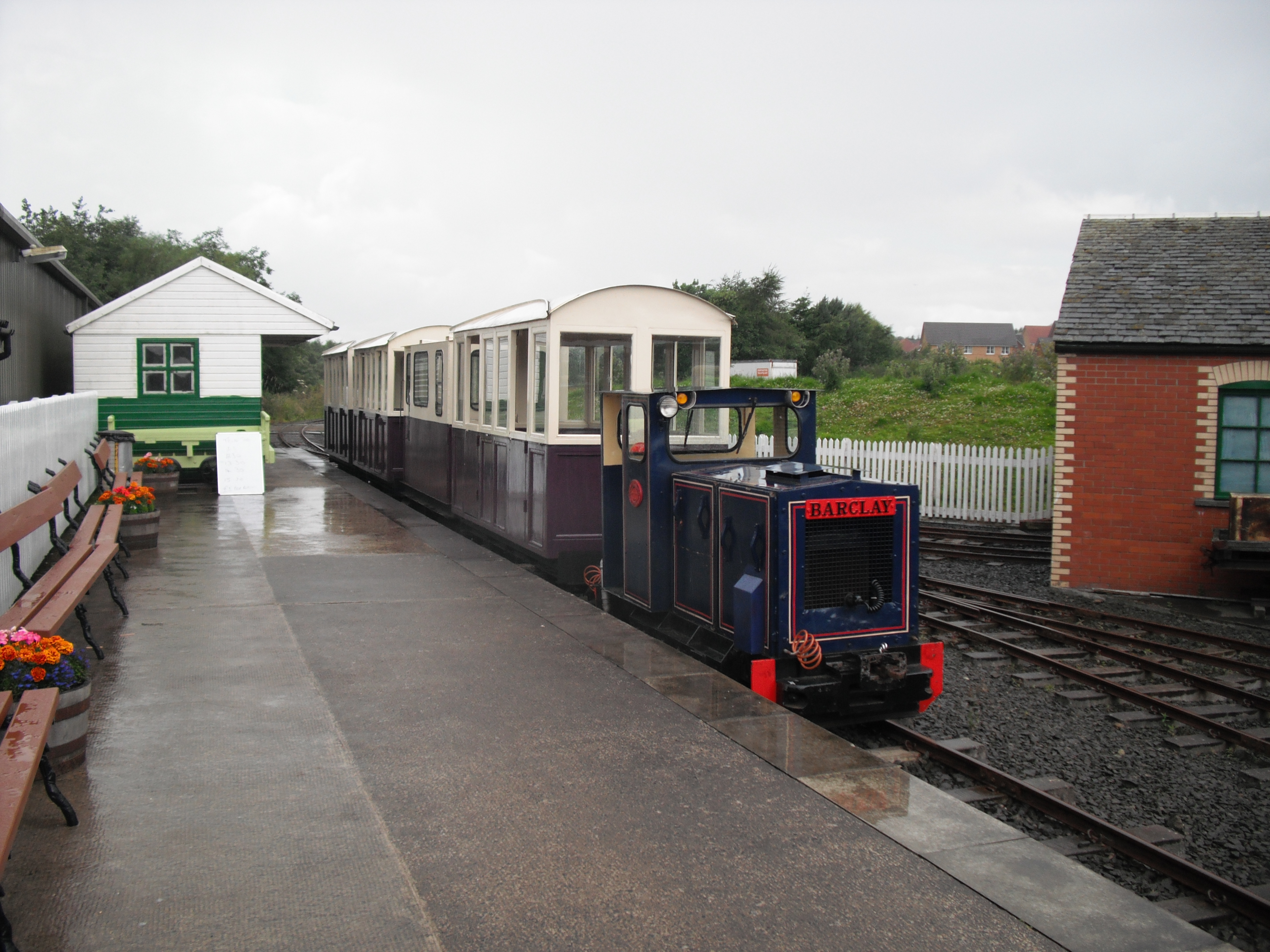
- Barclay diesel loco with passenger train at Livingston Mill Station. The line's loco shed is to the right.
- Locale: Livingston, Scotland
- Terminus: Livingston Mill Station

Preserved operations
- Operated by: Almond Valley Heritage Centre
- Stations: 2
- Length: 500m
- Preserved gauge: 2 ft 6 in (762 mm)

Commercial history
- Opened: 1993

Preservation history
- 1993: Railway begins operating using second hand military equipment
- 2006: Extension towards river Almond proposed

The Almond Valley Light Railway is a 2 ft 6 in (762 mm) narrow gauge heritage railway running at the Almond Valley Heritage Trust site at Livingston, Scotland. The railway operates at weekends between Easter and the end of September and daily during some school holiday periods. There are two stations, both with waiting shelters and run round loops. A small two-road loco shed is provided at the heritage centre end of the line. There is a storage siding here also.

== Locomotives ==
The line uses only internal combustion locomotives. It has never intended to use steam locomotives and therefore has no facilities for them. The railway is home to a number of electric locomotives (five battery, one overhead); however, these are not currently used.

Name	Builder	Type	Date	Works number	Livery	Photo
Oakbank No.2	Baldwin, U.S.A.	4wOE	1902	20587	(weathered)	
Hunslet	Hunslet Engine Company	0-4-0DM	1941	2270	Green	
	Greenwood & Batley	4wBE	1941	1698	Green	
Barclay	Andrew Barclay	4wDM	1970	557	Blue	
Battery	Brook Victor	4wBE	1972	1143	Yellow (weathered)	
	Brook Victor	4wBE	1972	612	Yellow (weathered)	
	Brook Victor	4wBE	1974	698	Yellow (weathered)	
	Brook Victor	4wBE	1974	700	Yellow (weathered)	
Scruffy	Hunslet Engine Company	4wDM	1973	7330	Sheer Aqua (Blue)	
Baguley-Drewry	Baguley-Drewry	4wDM	1980	3572	Green	
Simplex	Motor Rail	4wDM	1981	40SPF522	Yellow (weathered)	

== See also ==
- British narrow gauge railways
