= Gijón Railway Museum =

Railway museum in Asturias, Spain

Asturias Railway Museum
- Museo del Ferrocarril de Asturias
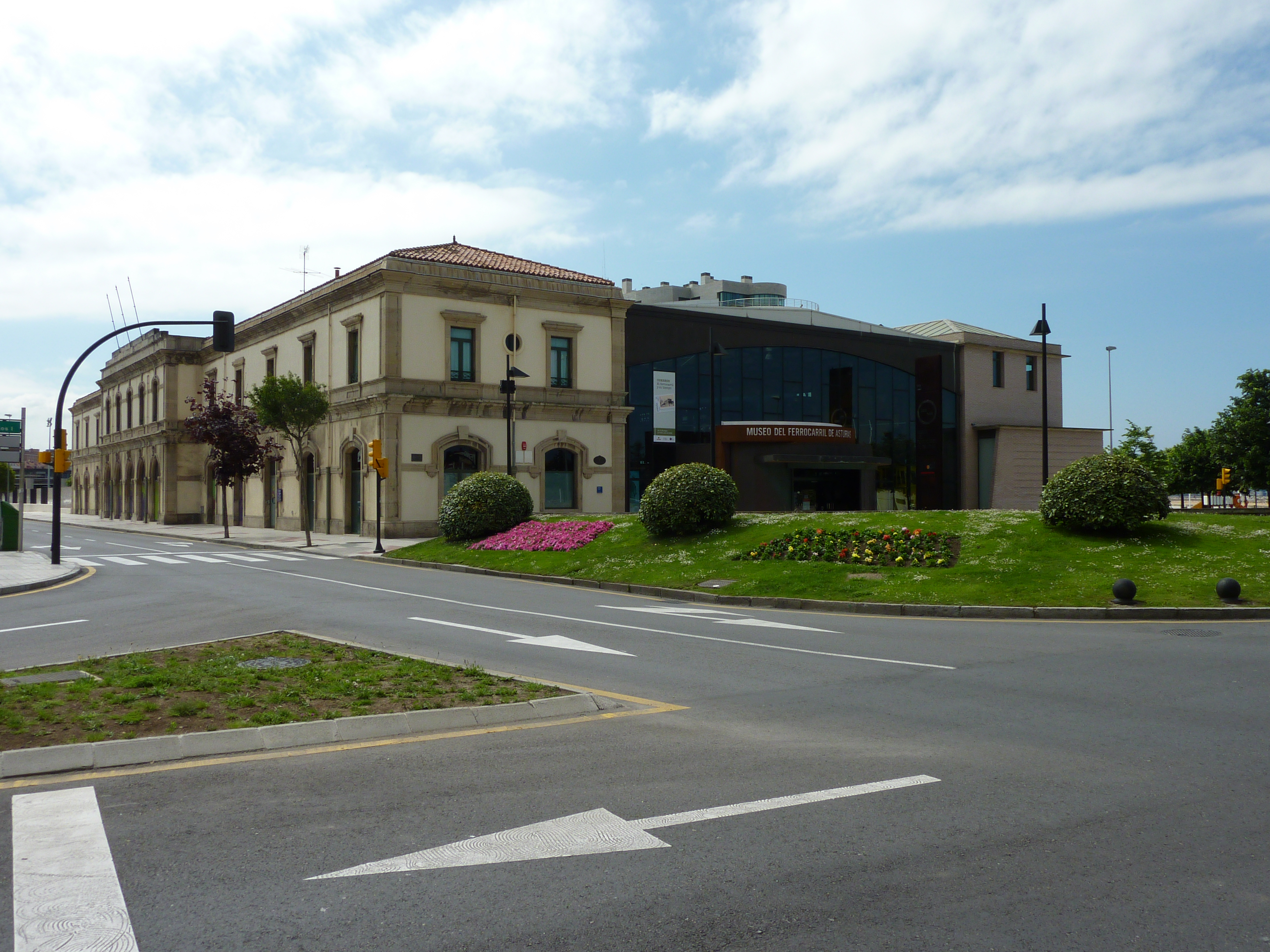
- Established: 1998; 28 years ago
- Location: Plaza de la Estación del Norte, Gijón, Asturias, Spain
- Coordinates: 43.5409°N 5.6727°W
- Website: The museum at Gijón City Council website

The Asturias Railway Museum or Gijón Railway museum (Museo del Ferrocarril de Asturias), in Gijón, Asturias, Spain, is an institution dedicated to restore, preserve and display to the public the railway history of Asturias. It was inaugurated on October 22, 1998 by the current king Felipe VI as Prince of Asturias in that moment. The centre is economically supported by Gijón City Council, and it’s integrated in the museums municipal network. It’s one of the most important Spanish railways museums.

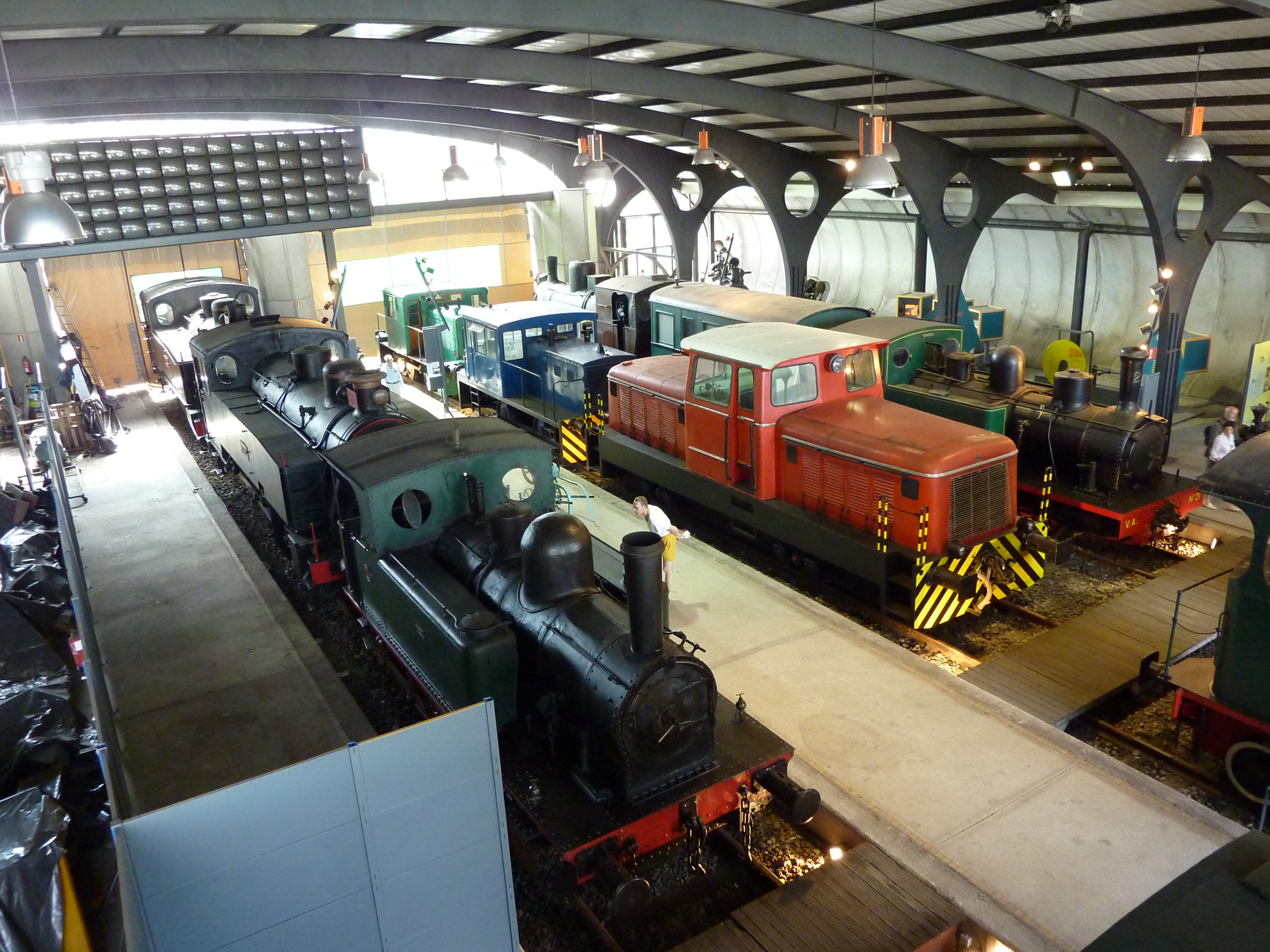
An overview of part of the museum.

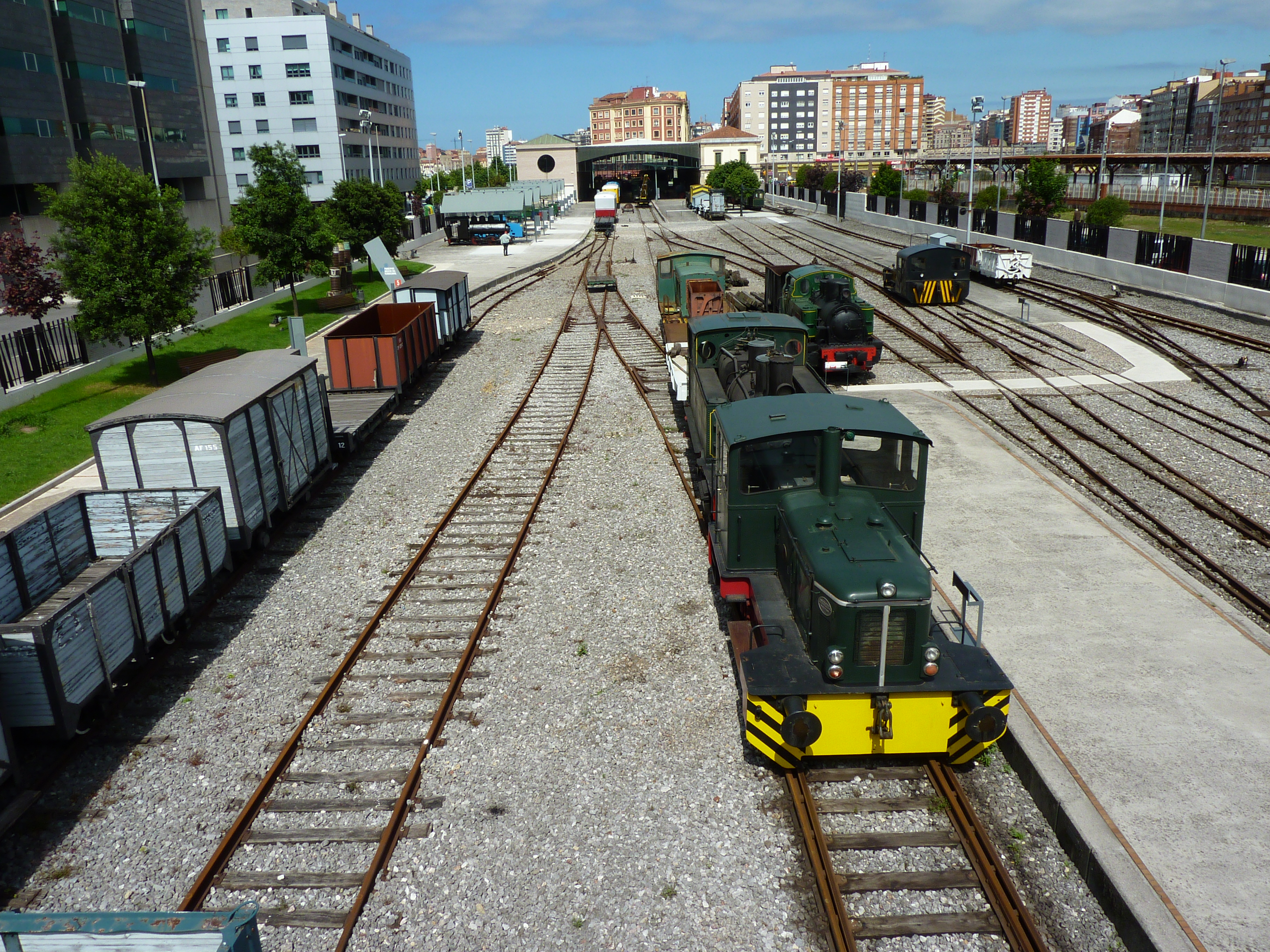
Outdoor tracks overview.

The museum is located at the old North Train Station of Gijón, very near Poniente Beach. It occupies more than 14,000 m^{2} and includes the original station, built in 1874, two new buildings and railway tracks.

== Collection ==
It has more than 1,000 objects, of which 140 are rolling stock including steam and diesel locomotives, wagons, trams and other material related with the history of train technologies in Spain. Those materials are Iberian gauge, narrow gauge and others until seven different track gauges types. The collection is closely connected with the large Asturias industrial history, in fact Asturias has the most dense rail network in the country.

Some of the museum steam locomotives come from Ferrocarril de Langreo, a line connecting Langreo and Gijón and was the fourth railway line built in Spain in 1852 and the third in Iberian Peninsula. The collection includes locomotives from other disappeared companies like Ferrocarriles del Norte, Vasco Asturiano and many locomotives used in coal and iron mines in Asturias.

The museum is a reference centre for the study of Spanish railway history and have many documentation (books, photographs, maps, statistics, companies shares, technical documents, economic studies, working and social conditions descriptions) available for researchers. An important part of that documentation is digitalized.

== Activities ==
Many locomotives are still operatives and several times during the year some steam locomotives are started and circulate over the rail tracks, these events are called Steam days. Steam days are very popular, and many people go these days to the museum platforms to see the old locomotives to move again and to travel in them.

One weekend per month, a train related market is held in museum platforms.

The museum has a room dedicated to railway modelling.

Other very important activity is the restoration workshop, in which the old locomotives and material recovered from industries, mines and train companies by the museum staff are restored to its originally state and if it is possible to a working state. In some cases, this is a difficult process that implies consulting technical and historic documents and takes a lot of time and money.

== Gallery ==
Stand out in the collection the following equipment:

Image	Description
	Sächsische Maschinenfabrik Steam Locomotive Nº 1112 constructed in 1881.
	Locomotive identification Plate.
	Steam Crane with vertical boiler constructed in 1890 at Trubia Artillery Factory. It’s the oldest Spanish functional vehicle.
	Corpet-Louvet Steam Locomotive Nº 542 constructed in Paris in 1891. It was used by Minas de Aller mining company
	La Maquinista Terrestre y Maritima SA steam locomotive type 020T constructed in 1910 in Spain. Its name is “Coronel Esteban” and it was the last commercial used locomotive in Asturias and was working until 1991.
	Vulcan Iron Works steam locomotive constructed in United States in 1916.
	HT120: Constructed in 1931 by Hulleras de Turón mining company. It could be considered the unique steam locomotive designed and constructed entirely in Asturias.
	Henschel & Son steam locomotive type 020WT constructed in 1952. It worked for S.A. Felgueroso company.
