= Penrhyn Port Class =

Hunslet Port class
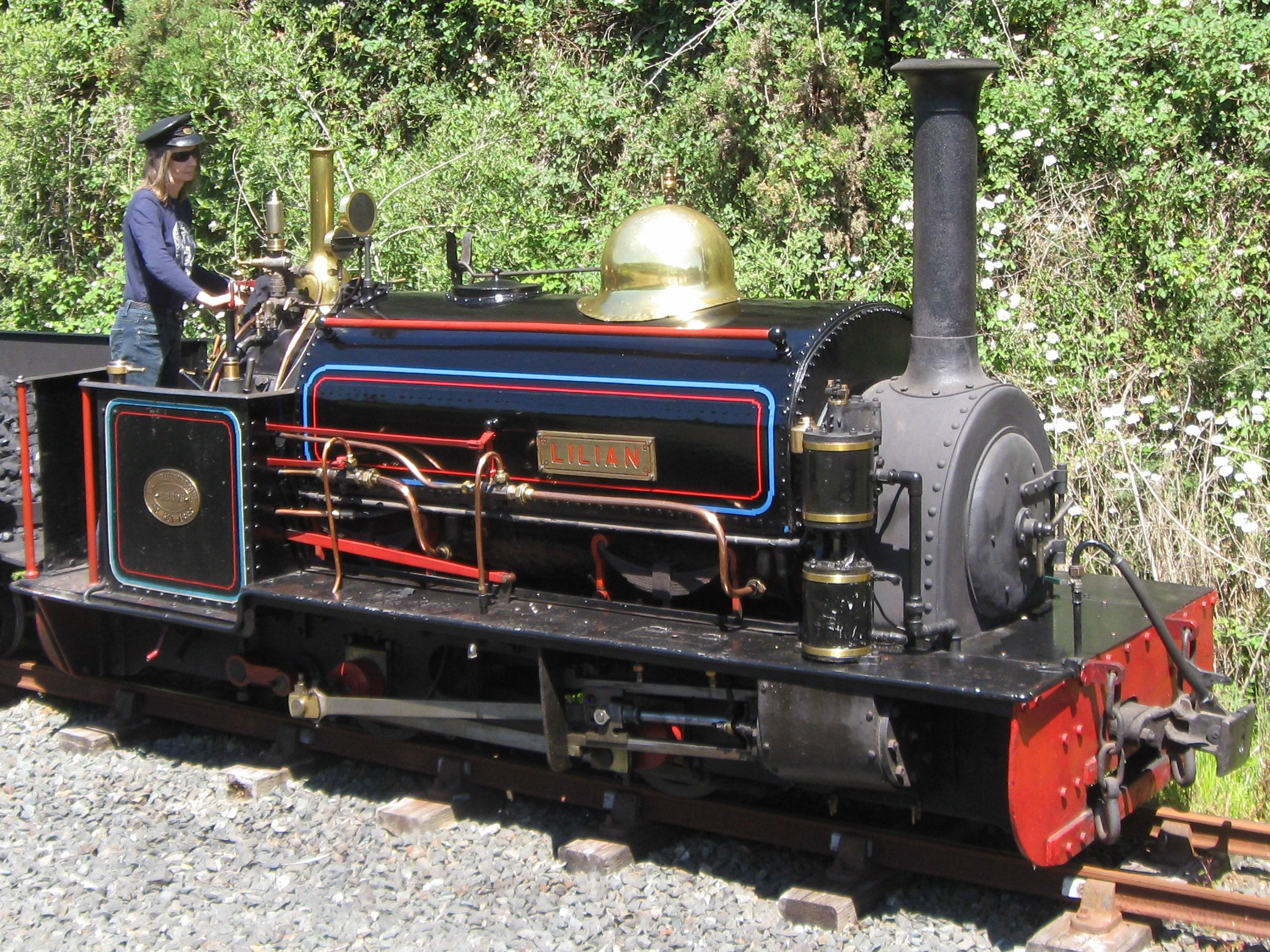
- Lilian at the Launceston Steam Railway (June 2010)
Type and origin
- Power type: Steam
- Builder: Hunslet Engine Company
- Build date: 1883–1885
Specifications
- Configuration
  - Whyte: 0-4-0ST
  - UIC: B n2
- Gauge: 1 ft 10 3/4 in (578 mm)
- Driver dia.: 1 ft 8 1/4 in (514 mm)
- Fuel type: Coal
- Water cap.: 150 imp gal (680 L; 180 US gal)
- Boiler pressure: 120 lbf/in^{2} (830 kPa)
- Cylinders: Two
Career
- Number in class: 3
- Official name: Gwynedd, Lilian, Winifred
- Locale: Penrhyn Quarry Railway
- Withdrawn: 1937–1956
- Disposition: All preserved
- The technical specifications are for the locomotives as delivered from Hunslet

The Penrhyn Port Class is a class of three narrow gauge steam locomotives built for the Penrhyn Quarry Railway (PQR). These locomotives were built by the Hunslet Engine Company between 1883 and 1885 and supplied specifically to work at Port Penrhyn near Bangor, north Wales. They were a variant of the standard Dinorwic Alice Class design.

== History ==
The three locomotives of this class were ordered by the Penrhyn Quarry Railway to replace two vertical boilered De Winton locomotives. The first pair, Gwynedd and Lilian were delivered in 1883 and the final locomotive of the class, Winifred was delivered in 1885.

Winifred worked until July 1964, Gwynedd until August 1954, and Lilian until August 1956.

== Preservation ==
All three engines are preserved. Gwynedd is preserved at the Bressingham Steam Museum, Lilian at the Launceston Steam Railway and Winifred spent many years in private ownership in the United States before returning to the UK in 2012 to work at the Bala Lake Railway.
