= Lydd Ranges =

Military firing range in Kent, England

Coordinates: 50°56′06″N 0°53′40″E

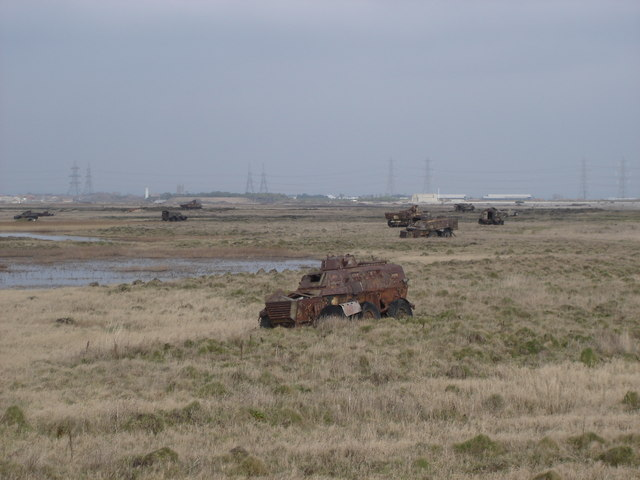
Lydd Ranges

Lydd Ranges is a military firing range south of Lydd, in Kent, England, extending as far as the south coast.

It has been used for military training for over 150 years and is part of the Dungeness, Romney Marsh and Rye Bay Site of Special Scientific Interest. Because the range is used for live firing, access is sometimes restricted - red flags are flown during these times, and access is prohibited along the foreshore and Galloways Road. Also, red lights are shown at restricted times if there is poor weather. The danger area extends out to sea, and mariners sailing to and from Rye Harbour must pass south of the Stephenson Shoal to avoid it. Firing occurs about 300 days a year. When firing is not taking place, it may be possible to walk along a designated path along the shore. Until the 90s it was home to the wreck of what is likely the only surviving Gun Carrier, 3-inch, Mk I, Churchill (A22D).

== Railway ==
There is a 2 ft (610 mm) narrow gauge railway on the range. It is principally a target railway, although it also carries personnel and equipment around the facility.

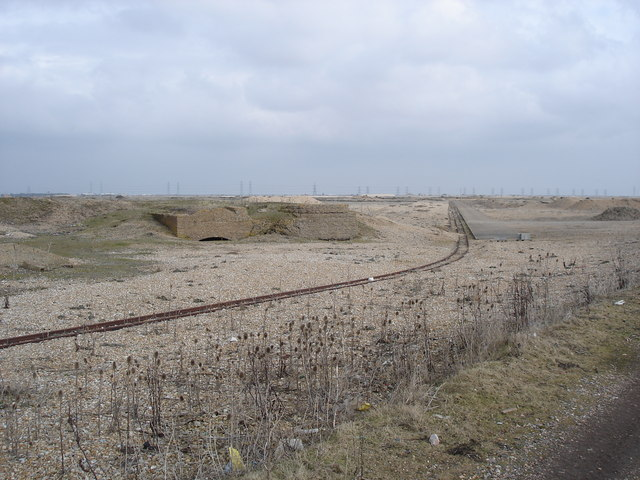
Railway in Lydd Ranges
