= Motor Rail =

British locomotive-building company

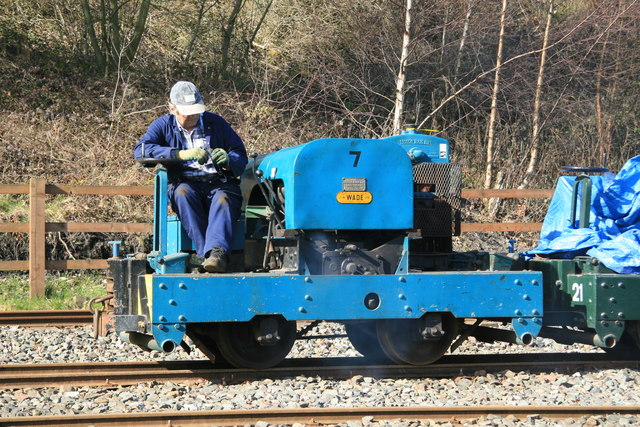
A 20/28 hp plate-frame Simplex built in 1941, running at the Moseley Railway Trust

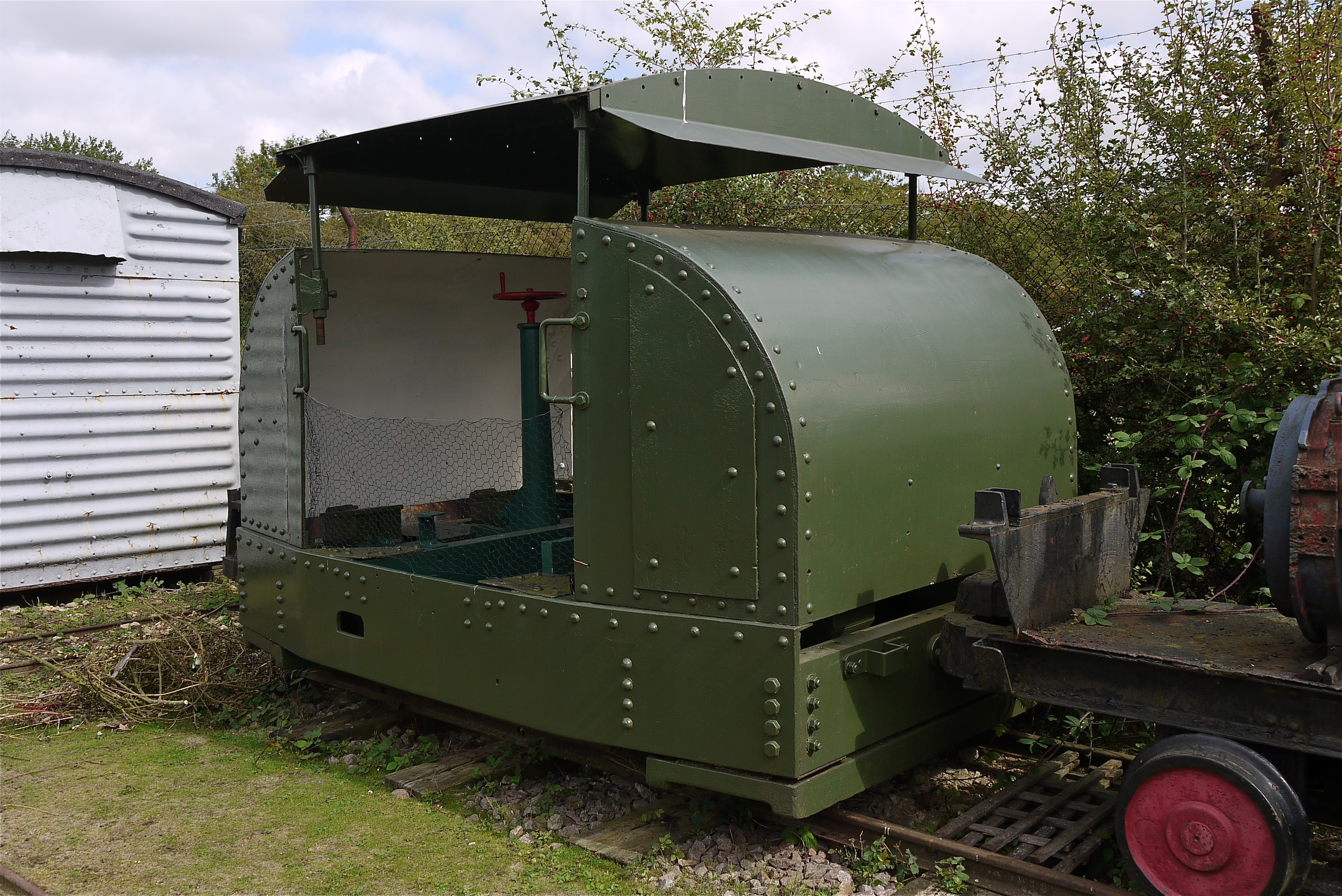
Simplex 40 hp armoured 600 mm (1 ft 11 5/8 in) gauge, built for the British Army for World War I

Two models of Simplex locomotive at Alan Keef's works, 1999

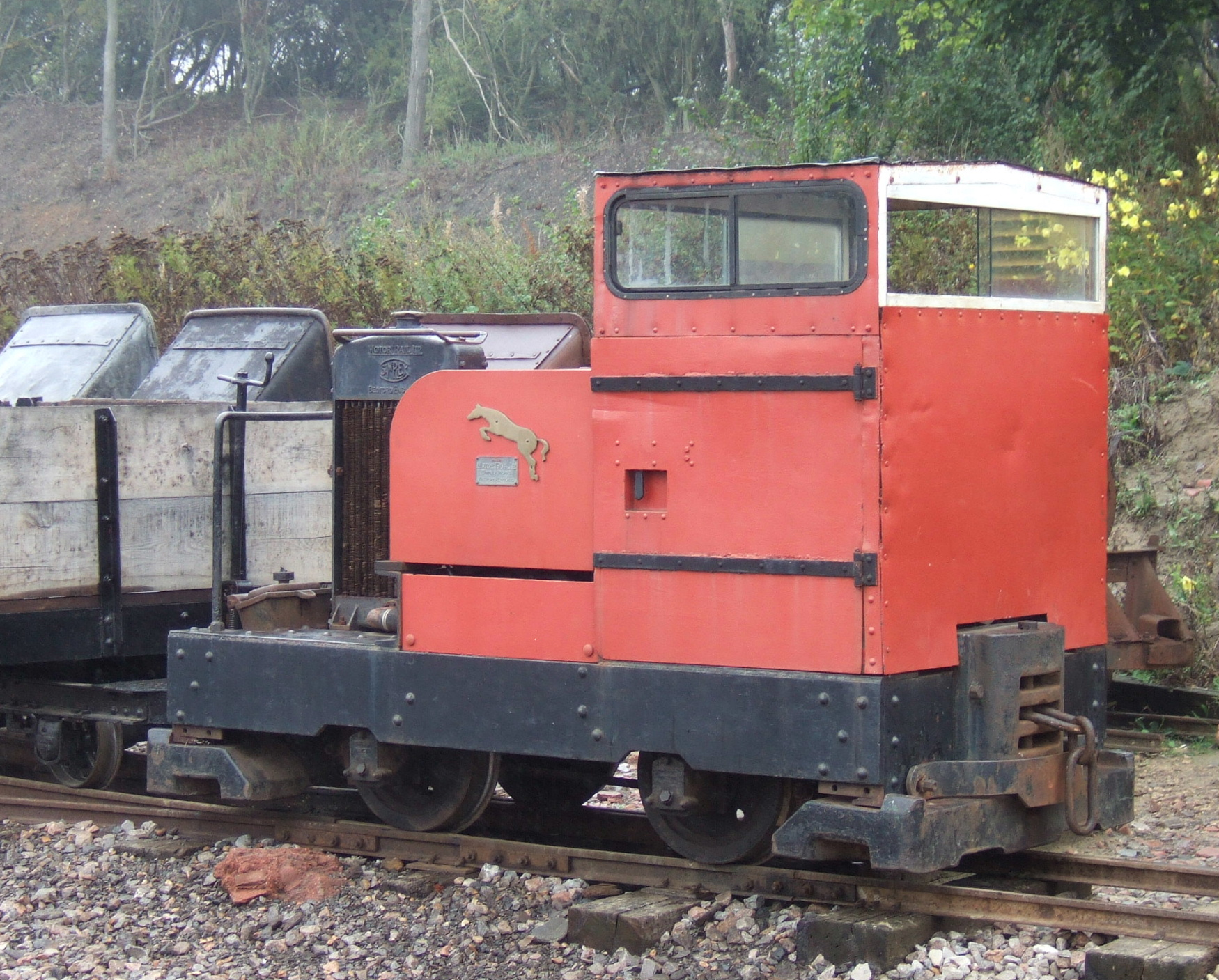
Red Rum at Leighton Buzzard Narrow Gauge Railway

Motor Rail was a British locomotive-building company, originally based in Lewes, Sussex, they moved in 1916 to Bedford. Loco manufacture ceased in 1987, and the business line sold to Alan Keef Ltd of Ross-on-Wye, who continue to provide spares and have built several locomotives to Motor Rail designs.

== History ==
The origins of the Motor Rail company can be traced back to the patenting of a gearbox by John Dixon Abbott of Eastbourne in 1909 ("Change speed and reversing gearbox suitable for use in motor-trams", UK Patent 18314). In March 1911, he formed The Motor Rail & Tramcar Co Ltd, with his father John Abbott and brother Tom Dixon Abbott. The stated aim of the business was developing the gearbox and incorporating it in tramcars and railcars. At about the same time operations moved to Lewes, Sussex and rented space in the Phoenix Foundry of John Every, where they developed a narrow-gauge rail vehicle around the Dixon-Abbott gearbox using a twin cylinder water-cooled Dorman engine.

In January 1916, the company answered a War Department tender for military supply railways. The specification was for a 600 mm (1 ft 11 5/8 in) gauge locomotive, with no more than 1 ton of axle load per axle, capable of hauling up to 15 tons at 5 miles per hour (8.0 km/h). The company designed a new locomotive, with outer longitudinal "bent-rail" frame, mounted on two driven axles. The 2JO petrol engine manufactured by W.H. Dorman & Co of Stafford was centre-set in the frame along with its Dixon-Abbott patent gearbox, which drove the unsprung axles through a chain-drive. At one end of the frame the operator sat facing to one side allowing him to drive equally well in either direction, and at the other end was the silencer and the water cooling radiator mounted with fan to provide transverse air flow. A large flywheel gave relatively smooth operation.

After approval by the War Department of the prototype, a small order was placed for evaluation in France. Success here led to significant orders and as a result the company moved to new premises in Houghton Rd, Bedford in May 1916. John Abbott died in August 1916, and John Dixon Abbott took over as chairman.

A second but armoured version was made to a specification defined by the Ministry of Munitions. This used an upgraded Dorman 4JO 40 hp engine and two speed gearbox, coming in three versions:

- Open: armoured end plates plus height-adjustable canopy on pillars
- Protected: as Open, plus armoured side doors and visors
- Armoured: completely enclosed with armour-plated roof, and end slits for the driver to look through

The Dorman engine used by Motor Rail from the earliest days was reported in 1918 to have been "designed by Mr Abbott, in conjunction with W.H. Dorman Ltd of Stafford", which could explain why the company exclusively used this engine. The same article states that the WW1 production of the Dixon-Abbott gearbox was contracted out to David Brown Ltd. of Huddersfield.

With over 900 such locomotives supplied to the WD and MoM, post-WW1 the resultant large and cheap supply of these trench tractors opened up the use of internal combustion engine powered locomotives to many new and existing applications, where steam engines were either too heavy or too expensive thus allowing cheaper operations. The company had found its niche, and continued to build petrol and diesel-engined locomotives, mainly for narrow gauge railways.

In 1931, the company changed its name from Motor Rail & Tram Car Co to Motor Rail Ltd. The trade name Simplex was registered in 1953, though the name Simplex was in use by the company as early as 1915. In 1972 the company was renamed Simplex Mechanical Handling Ltd.

== Locomotives ==
Fuel	Horsepower	Weight	AKA	Notes
Petrol	20	2 ton 5 cwt	Bow Frame	Original trench tractor built for the War Department specification.
Petrol	40	6 ton 6 cwt		Upgraded and armoured version of the 20 hp, built for the Ministry of Munitions.
Petrol	10/20	2 ton		First new post-WW1 design. 30 built between 1929-1940, latter version using Austin 12/4 engine.
Diesel	18	4 ton/5 ton		First diesel locomotive. First two models used the Helios 18 hp made by J. & H. McLaren Ltd. of the Midland Engine Works, Leeds. Quickly replaced by the 30HP Mercedes-McLaren engine. As it cost twice as much as a similar-powered petrol engine model to purchase, most went for export.
Diesel	20/28	4 ton/5 ton		Used Dorman 2RB engine. Designation changed to 20/36 hp in 1932.
Petrol	25/35	4 ton		A more powerful heavy-weight locomotive built for use by contractors from 1930-1937.
Diesel	65/85	10 ton		An advanced heavy-weight locomotive built in 1932, it proved unreliable and the only model produced was scrapped at the works during WWII.
Diesel	25/35	4 ton		Replaced 20/36 hp. Introduced in 1934 when the 2RB engine was upgraded. Uses same frame and gearbox as Petrol 25/35 hp, allowing later upgrade or inter change.
Petrol	25/40			One built for the Ford Motor Company at Dagenham in 1932. It used Ford AA 4-cylinder, 3-Litre side valve engine, the industrial version of the Ford Model A engine. Returned within a year, it was rebuilt and sold in 1937 to Dinmor Quarries Ltd.
Petrol	25/26	2 ton/3 ton		Available in 2 or 3 ton variants, it replaced the 20 hp from 1934 by using the more reliable Dorman 2JOR engine. Uses same frame and gearbox as the diesel-powered 20/28 hp
Diesel	25/28	2 ton/3 ton		Available in 2 or 3 ton variants, it replaced the 20 hp from 1934. Uses same frame and gearbox as the petrol-powered 20/26 hp

== Other products ==
In the early stage of its development, the Motor Rail & Tram Car Company was involved in developing self-propelled tramcars, though the extent of production is not clear. In 1915, The Engineer magazine reported on the Simplex Rail Coach made in Lewes with the Brush Company building the body, delivered to the South Indian Railway Company where it was expected to be run on the Pamban Viaduct line. The coach weighed 12 tons, would carry 70 people, and was powered by a four-cylinder Dorman petrol engine rated at 45 bhp. The tram car part of the company name was dropped in 1931, so it is presumed there was no tram car part of the business beyond this date.

In 1919, Motor Rail manufactured some standard gauge inspection cars for the Ministry of Munitions, and the testing of these cars on the branch line between Bedford and Hitchin was reported in The Engineer. The cars were powered by the two cylinder Dorman engine with Dixon-Abbott 2-speed gearbox, and averaged over 30 mph on the test, and reached 43 mph. One of the cars was run on paraffin, though it was intended they would be run on petrol. They were lightweight at only 3.25 tons, though could carry up to 2 tons payload if required. The seating being easily removable to offer load space.

In 1939, Motor Rail introduced the Motor Rail Dumper - a 4-ton, 2-wheel-drive dump truck (running on tyres rather than rails). It again used a Dorman engine, and a variant of the Dixon-Abbot gearbox. A working example (works number 8389 of 1947) with Dorman engine can be found at the Moseley Railway Trust. According to a 1955 advert, the diesel engine dumper had a capacity of 3 cubic yards, and had six forward gears and two reverse. It would carry a load of 4 tons up a 1 in 5 gradient. It was available with front control (driver at the front facing forward), or rear control (driver looking over the load, and hence with rear wheel steering, as is common modern practice). New models of this dumper for 1960 were the MR450 with 4.5 cubic yard capacity, reversible seat, and three speeds in either direction using a Dorman 37 bhp 2LB diesel engine; and the MR375 with 3.75 cubic yards capacity and 6 forward and 2 reverse gears which had a Lister 33 bhp HA3 air-cooled engine.

== Preserved locomotives ==
Many Motor Rail products survive in preservation, and they are probably the most common make of narrow gauge locomotive still in existence in the United Kingdom.

Heritage railways with Motor Rail locomotives include:

- Almond Valley Light Railway
- Amberley Museum Railway
- Battlefield Line Railway
- Chasewater Railway
- Corris Railway
- East Anglian Railway Museum
- East Lancashire Railway
- Ffestiniog Railway
- Golden Valley Light Railway
- Giant's Causeway and Bushmills Railway
- Great Bush Railway
- Great Central Railway
- International Rhine Regulation Railway (Austria)
- Lakeside and Haverthwaite Railway
- Lea Bailey Light Railway
- Leadhills and Wanlockhead Railway
- Leighton Buzzard Light Railway
- Lincolnshire Coast Light Railway
- Meirion Mill Railway
- Moseley Railway Trust
- Old Kiln Light Railway
- Ouche Valley Railway (France)
- Romney, Hythe and Dymchurch Railway
- Volk's Electric Railway
- Wales West Light Railway (USA)
- Welsh Highland Railway
- West Lancashire Light Railway
- Wicksteed Park, Kettering, Northamptonshire

== See also ==
- Lister Rail-Truck, a similar light locomotive, from R A Lister of Dursley
