= List of British private narrow-gauge railways =

Many private individuals in Great Britain own collections of narrow-gauge railway equipment or operate short railways. These railways are generally not open to the public, but often contain historically significant rolling stock or other items.

== Private collections ==
Name	Opened	Closed	Gauge	Location	Notes
D.L. Walker private collection	1970	1985?	1 ft 11 1/2 in (597 mm)	Minsterley, England	Static storage of quarry Hunslet Dorothea
F. Stapleton private collection	?	after 1987	2 ft (610 mm)	Newbury, England	4wDM locomotive in storage
I. Gunn private collection	?	after 1987	1 ft 10 in (559 mm)	Bristol, England	4wBE locomotive in storage
Ian Jolly private collection	1976	Present	various	Mold, Wales	A private collection of narrow-gauge locomotives, including a 1/4 mile line.
J. Hampton private collection	?	after 1987	3 ft (914 mm)	Fenstanton, England	4wDM locomotive in storage
J. Thomas private collection	before 1981	after 1987	2 ft (610 mm)	Bletchley, England	A private collection of narrow-gauge locomotives ex-Oxstead Greystone Lime
M.A.G. Jacobs private collection	?	after 1987	2 ft (610 mm)	Long Eaton, England	One 4wPM, one 4wDM locomotive
M. Capron private collection	?	after 1987	2 ft (610 mm)	Bristol, England	4wDM locomotive in storage
Pallot private collection	?	after 1987	2 ft (610 mm)	Jersey, Channel Islands	Two 4wDM locomotives
Pengally Farm	?	after 1987	2 ft (610 mm)	Callington, England	Private collection of narrow-gauge locomotives
Phyllis Rampton Narrow Gauge Railway Trust	?	Present	Various gauges	Surrey, England	Test track a private location near Godalming, Surrey. The trust owns the Vale of Rheidol Railway in Wales
Ray Maslen collection	?	present?	2 ft (610 mm)	Arlesey, England	
R.J. Harrison private collection	before 1981	?	2 ft (610 mm)	Carlisle, England	Private collection of narrow-gauge locomotives

== Private railways ==
Name	Opened	Closed	Gauge	Length	Location	Notes
Beeches Light Railway	2004	2023	2 ft (610 mm)	1 mile (1.6 km)	Steeple Aston, England,	A figure of eight layout in Adrian Shooter's garden, operated with the steam locomotive DHR 778.
Bredgar and Wormshill Light Railway	1970s	Present	2 ft (610 mm)	1/2 mile	near Maidstone, England	A short line laid across fields surrounding a private house, open for charity events one Sunday each month during the summer.
Bromyard and Linton Light Railway	1968	present	2 ft (610 mm)	1 mile (1.6 km)	Bromyard, England	A short line laid on the trackbed of the standard gauge former GWR Worcester-Bromyard branch.
Cadeby Light Railway	1962	2005	2 ft (610 mm)	97 yards	Hinckley, England	A short line and collection of rolling stock running round the rectory garden. Assembled by the late Reverend Teddy Boston, the line was closed in 2005.
Cheltenham Light Railway	?	?	2 ft (610 mm)	?	Cheltenham, England	A short private line, not open to the public
Creekmoor Light Railway	1967	1973	2 ft (610 mm)		Fleetsbridge, Poole, England	Technically an agricultural railway, its main use was for private passenger trains. Used a small collection of Motor Rail diesel locomotives and Orenstein & Koppel 9239 0-6-0WT locomotive Fojo.
Crockway Light Railway	1973	1979	2 ft (610 mm)		Maiden Newton, England	Built using the track and rolling stock of the Creekmoor Light Railway.
Derbyshire Dales Narrow Gauge Railway	1990	2018	2 ft (610 mm)	Unknown	Rowsley South railway station, Peak Rail	Private railway at, but separate from, Peak Rail. Rail lifted 2018-2019. Some of the trackbed to be used by The Ashover Light Railway Society's new running line.
Eynsford Light Railway	?	present	2 ft (610 mm)		Eynsford, England	Short private line in Kent, with ex-Provan Gas Works steam locomotive
Gartell Light Railway	1984	Present	2 ft (610 mm)	3/4 mile	Templecombe, England	Private railway with occasional open days
Great Bush Railway	1971	Present	2 ft (610 mm)	1/4 mile	Hadlow Down, England	Private railway with occasional open days
Hindlip and District Light Railway	1959	1971	2 ft (610 mm)	100 yards	Brockamin, England	Built by Alan Maund to run Kerr Stuart 3114.
Isle of Thanet Light Railway	1995	Present	2 ft (610 mm)	300 yards	Isle of Thanet, England	A short private line, not open to the public
Inny Valley Railway	1968	1987	1 ft 10 3/4 in (578 mm)	400 yards	Launceston, England	A short private line, not open to the public. ex-Dinorwic Bagnall locomotive Sybil was located here.
Oldberrow Light Railway	?	before 2002	2 ft (610 mm)	?	Henley-in-Arden, England	A short private line, not open to the public
Penton Light Railway	1981	?	2 ft (610 mm)	?	Penton, England	
Richmond Light Railway	2015	Present	2 ft (610 mm)	730 yards (670 m)	Kent, England	Extensive "garden" railway with eight steam and three internal combustion locomotives
Rheilffordd Llechi Sir Caernarfon	2004	present	1 ft 11 3/4 in (603 mm)		Gwynedd, Wales	Private railway
Ripon and District Light Railway	1984	present	2 ft (610 mm)	½ mile	Ripon, England	Private railway moving building materials around a housing estate. Uses extremely light track and Lister locomotives
Southfield House Railway	2004	Present	2 ft (610 mm)	2 Miles	Louth, England	A short private garden line, open to the public on special open days
Statfold Barn Railway	?	present	2 ft (610 mm) and 2 ft 6 in (762 mm)		Staffordshire, England	An extensive collection of restored narrow-gauge locomotives running on several miles of track. The railway hosts several open days each year.
Stevington and Turvey Light Railway	?	2014	2 ft (610 mm)		Turvey, England	A short line laid on the trackbed of a former standard gauge branch from Bedford. Closed due to vandalism in 2014 and the stock and rails moved to Woburn in Bedfordshire.
Surrey Light Railway	1976	2000	1 ft 11 3/4 in (603 mm)	?	Hersham, England	Fully signalled private line with one steam locomotive, several 4wDMs and 2 4wBEs. Most of the stock went to the Great Bush Railway on closure. From there the stock moved to Rheilffordd Llechi Sir Caernarfon.
Tiny Tramway Mining Company	1991	1995	2 ft (610 mm) and 18 in (457 mm)	?	Corfe Mullen, England	Locomotive-worked garden railway with a working mine shaft and adit for sand extraction.
Tucking Mill Tramway	?	1987	2 ft (610 mm)	?	Midford, England	A short private line
Umberslade Light Railway	?	?	2 ft (610 mm)	?	Hockly Heath, England	A short private line, not open to the public
Vobster Light Railway	1991	1994	2 ft (610 mm)	1/4 mile	Vobster, England	Diesel locomotive worked short line connecting with the trackbed of the standard gauge Newbury Railway
Wootton Railway	2009	Present	2 ft (610 mm)	?	Northampton, England	A short private garden line, not open to the public
Wychbold Railway	1963	1970	2 ft (610 mm)	1/2 mile	Droitwich, England	Built by Graham Mullis to run 0-4-0WT locomotive Eigiau purchased from Penrhyn quarry. Steam locomotives Una (Hunslet 873), Diana (Kerr Stuart 1158) and Mesozoic (Peckett 1327) were also located here, but did not run.
Wychwood Railway	1965	1970	2 ft (610 mm)	1/2 mile	Leamington Spa, England	Brian Goodchild's private railway featuring Baguley 774, Motor Rail 8575, Hunslet 2207 and Lister 41545.

== See also ==
- British narrow-gauge railways
