= Inny =

Inny may refer to

- River Inny (disambiguation)
- Inny Radebe (born 1995), South African rugby union player
- Inny Junction railway station on the Dublin-Sligo railway line in Ireland
- Inny Valley Railway in Cornwall, England

== See also ==
- Innie (disambiguation)
