= Steam Mills Crossing Halt railway station =

Disused railway station in Steam Mills, Gloucestershire

Steam Mills Crossing Halt

General information
- Location: Steam Mills, Gloucestershire; England
- Coordinates: 51.8389°N 2.5111°W
- Grid reference: SO648157

Other information
- Status: Disused

History
- Original company: Great Western Railway
- Post-grouping: Great Western Railway

Key dates
- 3 August 1907: Opened
- 7 July 1930: Closed
Location

Steam Mills Crossing Halt railway station served the village of Steam Mills, Gloucestershire, England, from 1907 to 1930 on the Mitcheldean Road and Forest of Dean Junction Railway.

== History ==
The station was opened on 3 August 1907 by the Great Western Railway. It closed on 7 July 1930.

Preceding station	Disused railways	Following station
Nailbridge Halt; Line and station closed	Great Western Railway; Mitcheldean Road and Forest of Dean Junction Railway	Whimsey Halt; Line and station closed
