= Nailbridge Halt railway station =

Disused railway station in Nailbridge, Gloucestershire

Nailbridge Halt

General information
- Location: Nailbridge, Gloucestershire; England
- Coordinates: 51.8474°N 2.5179°W
- Grid reference: SO644166

Other information
- Status: Disused

History
- Original company: Great Western Railway
- Post-grouping: Great Western Railway

Key dates
- 4 November 1907: Opened
- 7 July 1930: Closed
Location

Nailbridge Halt railway station served the suburb of Nailbridge, Gloucestershire, England, from 1907 to 1930 on the Mitcheldean Road and Forest of Dean Junction Railway.

== History ==
The station was opened on 4 November 1907 by the Great Western Railway. It closed on 7 July 1930.

Preceding station	Disused railways	Following station
Drybrook Halt; Line and station closed	Great Western Railway; Mitcheldean Road and Forest of Dean Junction Railway	Steam Mills Crossing Halt; Line and station closed
