= Inee =

Inee or INEE may refer to:

- Inter-Agency Network for Education in Emergencies
- Inee, a type of arrow poison made from the plant Strophanthus hispidus

== See also ==
- Innie (disambiguation)
