= Bailey Level Gold Mine =

Former gold mine and iron mine in the Forest of Dean, England

Coordinates: 51°52′23″N 2°30′57″W

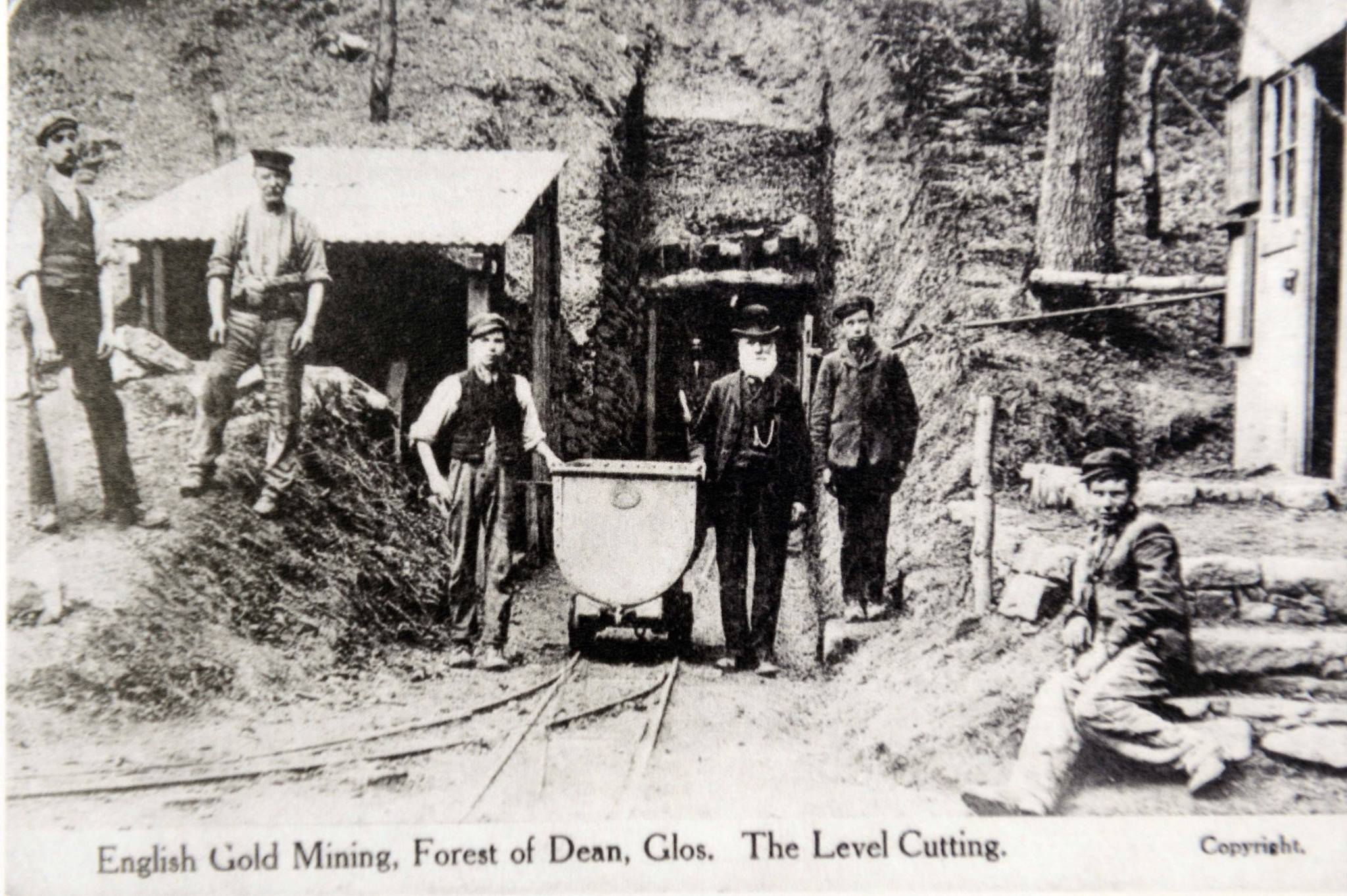
Postcard of the original Bailey Level Gold Mine

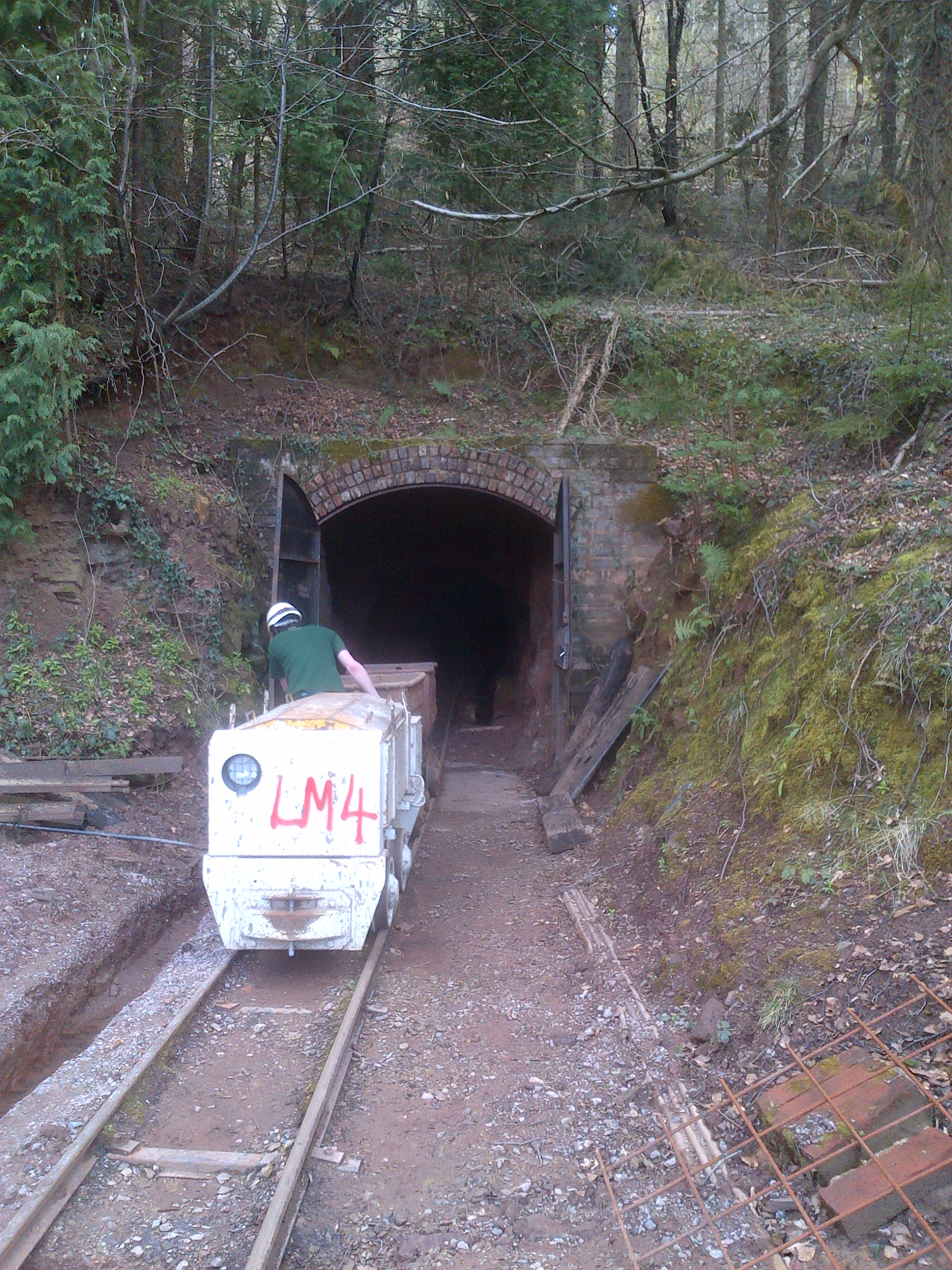
Wingrove & Rogers WR8 battery-electric locomotive propelling tipper wagons into the mine

Bailey Level is a former gold mine and iron mine in the Forest of Dean, England. The mine and surface features are currently managed by volunteer members of Lea Bailey Light Railway Society.

The gold mine was started by the Chastan Syndicate in 1906. Shares were offered at £1 each (equivalent to £136 in 2023). Some 75,000 shares were sold. (equivalent to £10,189,807 in 2023) However, test workings at Lea Bailey and nearby Staple Edge concluded that the small amount of gold present could not be extracted economically and the syndicate was wound up in 1908.

The mine was later extended and some 3,000 long tons (3,048 t; 3,360 short tons) of iron ore were extracted — a small amount compared to the 150,000 long tons (152,407 t; 168,000 short tons) extracted from the nearby Wigpool Ironstone Mine.
