= Whimsey Halt railway station =

Disused railway station in Cinderford, Gloucestershire

Whimsey Halt

General information
- Location: Cinderford, Gloucestershire; England
- Coordinates: 51.8339°N 2.5119°W
- Grid reference: SO648151

Other information
- Status: Disused

History
- Original company: Great Western Railway
- Post-grouping: Great Western Railway

Key dates
- 3 August 1907: Opened
- 7 July 1930: Closed
Location

Whimsey Halt railway station served the town of Cinderford, Gloucestershire, England, from 1907 to 1930 on the Mitcheldean Road and Forest of Dean Junction Railway.

== History ==
The station was opened on 3 August 1907 by the Great Western Railway. It closed on 7 July 1930.

| Preceding station | Disused railways | Following station |
|---|---|---|
| Steam Mills Crossing Halt; Line and station closed | Great Western Railway; Mitcheldean Road and Forest of Dean Junction Railway | Terminus |
