= LBLR =

LBLR may refer to:

- Lea Bailey Light Railway
- Leighton Buzzard Light Railway
