= Jackson Brothers =

Jackson Brothers, commonly known as Jackson Bros, was a firm known for its dominance of the variable capacitor (or 'tuning condenser') market in the early days of radio broadcasting. Founded in 1923 to provide tuning capacitors for the growing home construction market, by the Fillmore family in Lewisham, England, (there never was a pair of people involved who were Jackson brothers!) the firm went on to manufacture a huge variety of the, mostly air-spaced, two or three gang, variable capacitors, that were at the heart of all radio receivers until the invention of the varicap diode, which replaced them, especially in VHF designs, and the frequency-synthesizer front ends that are now found in most radio receivers.

== History ==
=== Early beginnings ===
The money for the enterprise came largely from Grandfather Fillmore, who wanted to call the company ‘John Bull and Company’, but other relatives opposed this, and it was settled that Jackson Brothers sounded suitably British.

Production of Capacitor kits began in a shop in Soho for home assembly. After a short while it was realised that it would be better to sell assembled components but through 1923/24 business was erratic. In 1932 the firm was converted to a Private Limited Company and moved to a site near London Bridge Station, from where Bush, EKCO, Murphy and Sobell were supplied. The range then included direct drive and slow motion capacitors that incorporated epicyclic ball-bearing reduction units. The ‘Dilecon’ solid dielectric variable tuning capacitors were widely used for by constructors of TRF and Crystal set receivers, while air-spaced tuning capacitors which offered greater stability and accuracy were usually used in superhet receivers.

=== World War 2 ===
At the outbreak of War in 1939, Jackson Bros, and Wingrove & Rogers were major suppliers of capacitors and tuning components for the Services but in 1941 the Jackson Bros factory was destroyed in a fire-bombing raid. The firm then moved to Waddon, Croydon, at the site of the old Beddington Airfield and part of the site remained in use for Research and Development until 1992. After the War sales of new radio parts fell as huge amounts of War Surplus radio equipment became cheaply available, and the relationship with Wingrove & Rogers reverted to normal competition. Purchase Tax made home sales less attractive and business was difficult for a few years, until a move to sell overseas resulted in sales agents being appointed in the Netherlands, Denmark, South Africa, Australia and India, where variable capacitors became known as JBs.

== See also ==
- History of radio
- Crystal radio
- Variable capacitor
