= Great Bush Railway =

Private railway in East Sussex, England

Coordinates: 50°59′44.25″N 0°11′24.45″E

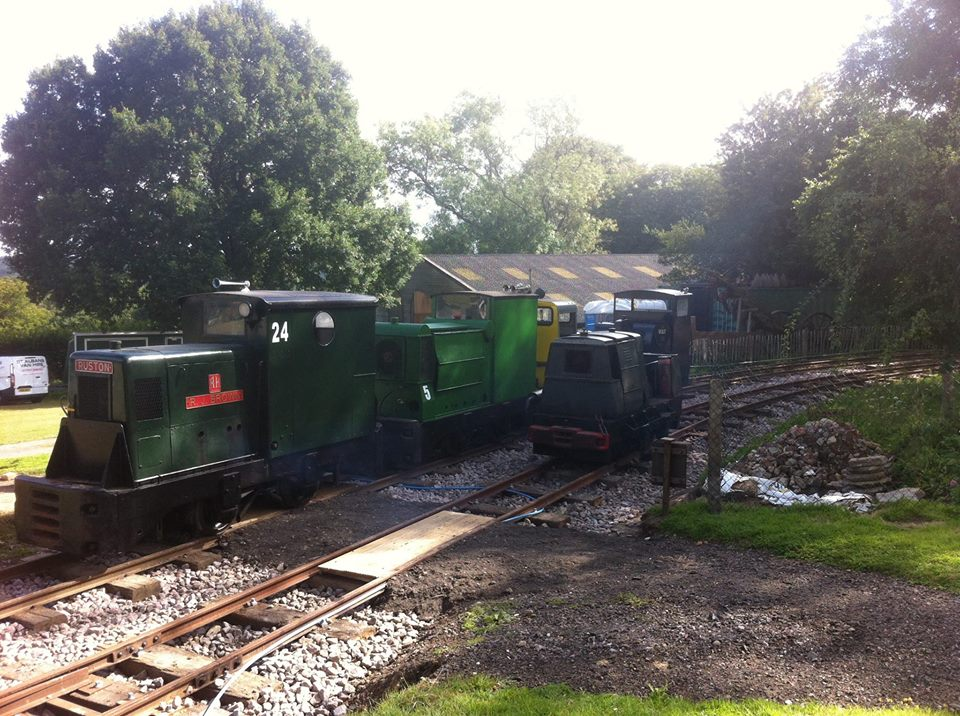
- Diesel locomotives of the Great Bush Railway

Overview
- Headquarters: Hadlow Down
- Locale: England
- Dates of operation: 1969–Present

Technical
- Track gauge: 2 ft (610 mm)
- Length: 500m

The Great Bush Railway is a private, 2 ft (610 mm) narrow gauge running round the edge of Tinkers Park, Hadlow Down, Sussex. The railway is operated by the Claude Jessett Trust Company. The line is 500 metres long and has three stations, Hadlow Down, Bracherlands Junction and Tinkers Lane.

The railway only opens to the public on Tinkers Park events.

== History ==
The line was laid down by Claude Jessett as an attraction to accompany the yearly steam rallies and as a replacement for an earlier miniature railway that existed around his garden. A heavily converted Motor Rail (later named Aminal [sic]) was acquired from a nearby brickworks. This, alongside coaches built from brick trolleys, ran for a couple of years.

A volunteer group (named FIDO, not an acronym, but named due to the age of the volunteers) established themselves on the site and ran the line. More locomotives were acquired, putting the very worn Aminal out of use. Later the coaches were retired and a bogie coach built to take their place. Over time the FIDO group left for pastures new and the line has since been run by the Claude Jessett Trust as part of the Tinkers Park site.

The line was extended gradually, with a cutting dug by hand, to allow the line to run along the edge of an adjoining field.

== The line today ==
The line runs in a U shape around the edge of a field. From Hadlow Down station, there is a straight run alongside the "Great Bush" which gives the railway its name, before reaching the locomotive shed, workshop and various sidings. After passing alongside, the line then reaches Bracherlands junction passing loop. The line then drops into a 1in25 curve situated in a cutting. The cutting being the largest feature on the line, having been dug gradually while the old organ museum halt being the end of the line (removed and replaced by the latter Bracherlands Junction platform.) After the cutting the line has taken a 180 degree turn running alongside another hedge before crossing over an access road between event fields and ending at Tinkers Lane station.

== Current locomotives ==
Number	Name	Builder	Type	Date	Works number	Notes	Image
1	Aminal	Motor Rail	4wDM (ex 4wPM)	1933	5361	Purchased from the Ludlay Brick and Tile Company. Heavily modified using parts from a Trojan Van	
4	Mild	Motor Rail	4wDM	1941	8687	Purchased from the Crowborough Brickworks	
5	Alpha	Ruston & Hornsby	4wDM	1937	183744	Donated from the APCM Rodmell Works	
10	Cape	Orenstein & Koppel	4wDM	1935	5926	Received from Cape Universal Products, 1976. Moved to Amberley Museum. Then to Abbey Light Railway. Returned 2018.	
14	Albany	Ruston & Hornsby	4wDM	1941	213840	Originally from the 18 in (457 mm) gauge Royal Arsenal Railway, converted to 2 ft (610 mm) gauge in 1973	
15	Olde	Hudson Hunslet	4wDM	1940	2176	Arrived 1977, left 1979. Went to the Stevington & Turvey Light Railway. Returned 2022.	
22	Lama	BEV	4wBE	1953	5033	Purchased from the Crowborough Brickworks	
23	Dennis	BEV	0-4-0BE	1972	M7534	ex Crowborough Brickworks, In unrestored condition	
24	Titch	BEV	0-4-0BE	1972	M7535	Purchased from the Crowborough Brickworks	
25	Wolf	Motor Rail	4wDM	1940	7469	Worked at Ham Marsh Gravel Pits, Faversham	
28	São Domingos	Orenstein & Koppel	0-6-0WT	1928	11784	Worked at the Douro valley coal mines, Portugal.	
29	Penrhyn No.24	Ruston & Hornsby	4wDM	1955	382820	Worked at Penrhyn Quarry Railway	
30	Drusilla	Motor Rail	4wDM	1965	22236	Ex Drusillas Zoo Park	
31	Grünewald	Diepholzer Maschinenfabrik Fritz Schöttler	4wDM	1953	1600	Was owned by the Efteling Steam Train Company at Efteling theme park. Later Ex Stevington and Turvey Light Railway	

== Former locomotives ==
Number	Name	Builder	Type	Date	Works number	Notes
2	Sezela No. 2	Avonside	0-4-0T	1915	1720	
3	Goat	Lister	4wDM	1936	8022	Purchased from the Crowborough Brickworks, swapped for Albany with the Island NG Group IOW, 1977
6	Sezela No. 6	Avonside	0-4-0T	1928	1923	
7	Fido	Motor Rail	4wPM	1931	5297	Ex Island NG Group IOW, 1976; sold to Ian Jolly, 1977, Now at Old Kiln Light Railway
8	Tuesday	Hibberd	4wDM	1941	2586	Ex Island NG Group IOW 1976; sold to the Leadhills and Wanlockhead Railway, 1988
9	Smifsagit	Hunslet Hudson	4wDM	1944	3109	Ex Island NG Grop IOW, 1976; sold to Alan Keef, 1979
11	Layer	Fowler	4wDM	1936	21294	Ex Brockham Museum, later Leeds Industrial Museum at Armley Mills
12		Hibberd	4wDM	1938	2136	Ex Horam Brickworks, later to Nick Williams, Reading
13	Peter Pan	Kerr Stuart	0-4-0ST	1922	4265	Arrived September 1977, left May 1978
17	Bear	Ruston & Hornsby	4wDM	1952	339209	Arrived 1978, left 1979
18	Owl	Ruston & Hornsby	4wDM	1939	283513	Arrived 1978, left 1979
19		Hibberd	4wDM	1943	2631	Arrived 1979, left 1987
20		Wingrove & Rogers	4wBE	1951	4634	Arrived 1980 ex Crowborough Brickworks, scrapped 2006
21		Wingrove & Rogers	4wBE	1953	5035	Arrived 1980 ex Crowborough Brickworks, Scrapped 2010
26	No 4	Ruston & Hornsby	4wDM	1936	177638	Arrived 2000, left 2011
27	Number 22	Ruston & Hornsby	4wDM	1944	226302	Arrived 2000, left 2011

== Current rolling stock ==
Number	Name	Builder	Type	Date	Notes	Image
105		Robert Hudson	Bogie Coach	1981	Built in 1981 to replace former 4w coaches built on Crowborough brickworks wagons.	
106	"Trev"		4w Coach		Built originally for a private line in Newbold Vernon. Was used in the 2017 season as a generator coach.	
110		Great Bush Railway	4w Penrhyn Replica Coach	2018	Built in 2018 to a Penrhyn Quarry Railway Design.	
111		A Vaughan Woodworks	Bogie Coach	2019	Built in 2019 to a freelance design inspired by Manx Electric Railway trailer cars.	
112		Severn Lamb	Bogie Coach	?	Built for the Cotswold Wildlife Park. Ex Stevington and Turvey Light Railway. Currently operating as a bogie flat wagon, awaiting a new coach body superstructure to be built as the old one was unserviceable.	
201		Du Croo & Brauns	4w flat		Currently not carrying barrel unlike seen in the picture.	
202		Robert Hudson	4w Skip		Ex Rodmell Cement Works	
203		Robert Hudson	4w Skip		Ex Rodmell Cement Works	
204		Robert Hudson	4w Skip		Ex Rodmell Cement Works	
205		Robert Hudson	4w Skip		Chassis converted to a planked side wagon.	
207		Robert Hudson	4w skip		Chassis converted to a flat wagon	
208		Robert Hudson	Bogie Flat		Ex MOD. Originally built for RAF Chilmark as NGF 8037, was moved to RAF Eastriggs after RAF Chilmark closed. Believed to have been acquired in the dispersal auctions.	
209		Robert Hudson	Bogie Bolsters		Ex wagon bogies converted to bolster wagon pair.	
210		Robert Hudson	Brick Wagon		Ex Crowborough Brickworks, was used as a coach before rebuilt.	
211		Robert Hudson	Brick Wagon		Ex Crowborough Brickworks, was used as a coach before rebuilt.	
301		Great Bush Railway	Pump Trolley		Old skip frame converted to a pump trolley.	

== Former rolling stock ==
Number	Name	Builder	Type	Date	Notes	Image
101		Robert Hudson	4w Toastrack	1969	4w Coach built on Crowborough Brickworks chassis.	
102		Robert Hudson	4w Toastrack	1969	4w Coach built on Crowborough Brickworks chassis.	
103		Robert Hudson	4w Toastrack	1969	4w Coach built on Crowborough Brickworks chassis.	
104			4w Toastrack with roof	1969	4w Coach built on Ludlay Brickworks chassis. Body later used on old 206 bolster wagon as a temporary passenger coach.	
107		East Hayling Light Railway	4-wheel third		Sold to the Old Kiln Light Railway. Awaiting overhaul and conversion into a coach for disabled persons.	
108		East Hayling Light Railway	4-wheel third	1996	Sold to the Old Kiln Light Railway. Awaiting overhaul.	
109		East Hayling Light Railway	4-wheel third	1992	Sold to the Old Kiln Light Railway. Now under overhaul.	
206		Great Bush Railway	Bogie Bolsters		Replaced by current 209, bolsters built from Crowborough Brickworks wagons	
208		Great Bush Railway	Tool Van		Built on ex Lydd Ranges chassis. Dismantled. Replaced by current 208 bogie flat	

== See also ==
- British narrow gauge railways
- Tinkers Park - Home of The Claude Jessett Collection
