= Drybrook Halt railway station =

Disused railway station in Drybrook, Gloucestershire

Drybrook Halt
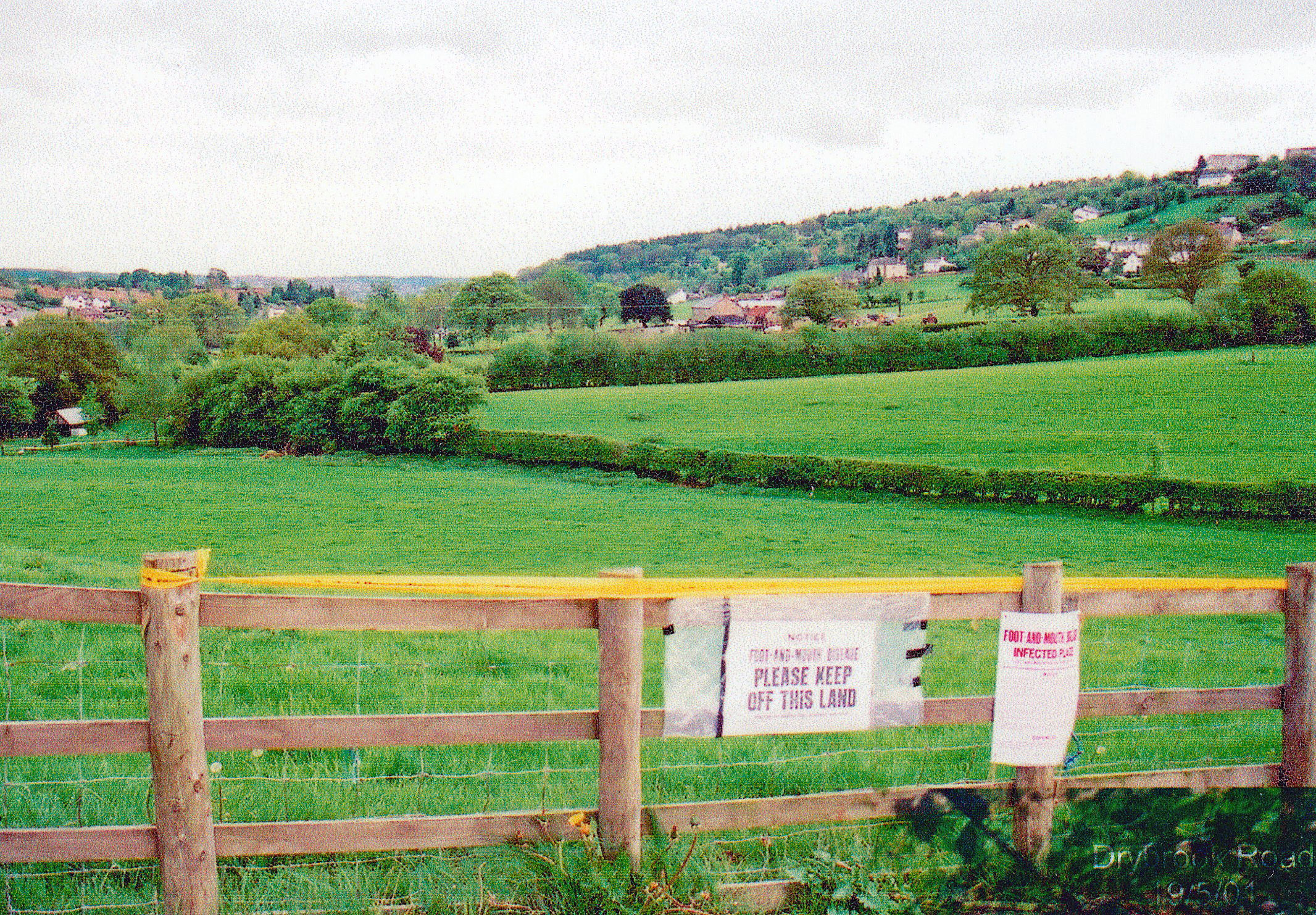
- The site of the station in 2001

General information
- Location: Drybrook, Gloucestershire; England
- Coordinates: 51.8555°N 2.5216°W
- Grid reference: SO641175
- Platforms: 1

Other information
- Status: Disused

History
- Original company: Great Western Railway
- Post-grouping: Great Western Railway

Key dates
- 4 November 1907: Opened
- 7 July 1930: Closed
Location

Drybrook Halt railway station served the village of Drybrook, Gloucestershire, England, from 1907 to 1930 on the Mitcheldean Road & Forest of Dean Junction Railway.

== History ==
The station was opened on 4 November 1907 by the Great Western Railway. It closed on 7 July 1930.

Preceding station	Disused railways	Following station
Mitcheldean Road; Line and station closed	Great Western Railway; Mitcheldean Road & Forest of Dean Junction Railway	Nailbridge Halt; Line and station closed
