= British Electric Vehicles =

British Electric Vehicles (BEV) of Churchtown, Southport, Lancashire, built industrial vehicles including both small electrically motorised trolleys for carrying raw materials and products around factories and electric locomotives desirable for use underground and in flammable environments.

== Company history ==
British Electric Vehicles Ltd was formed in 1905 (121 years ago) with works in Churchtwon, Southport. The business used patented controllers made by Wingrove & Rogers Ltd of Kirkby, Liverpool, and in 1926 the business was purchased by Wingrove & Rogers who continued to use the B.E.V trademark. In the early 1990s Wingrove & Rogers was purchased by Pikrose Group in Oldham Lancashire, working until 2005 under the Ferranti Engineering company until the mining electric vehicles business was purchased in mid-2005 by a Peruvian industrial group that acquired the manufacturing engineering and licensed the BEV brand. Now the mining electric locomotives in battery and trolley types are being manufactured in the Serminsa Group facilities.

== Products ==
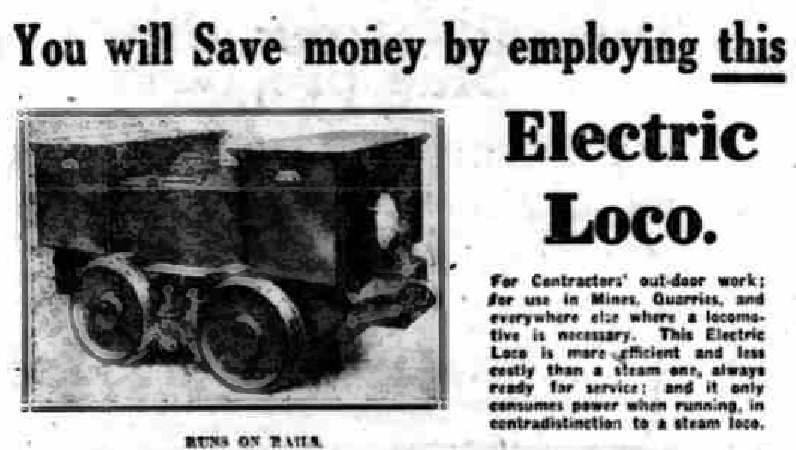
1919 Advert for Battery Locomotive

At the British Empire exhibition in 1924, B.E.V. exhibited three of their products to illustrate their range and give examples of where they are used. These were as follows :

- No 2 battery locomotive for use in mines, tunneling and general works. 150 example of this model were in use in England, and they were being used for the extension of the London Underground and a smaller size by London County Council on extensions to the main sewers.
- Super Giant Industrial Truck. Described as being like a motor lorry in miniature with 5000 lbs load capacity. Port of London Authority were using about 40 of these trucks.
- Midget Whippet truck. A small battery truck for machine shops, warehouses, etc. This will turn from one 4-foot aisle into another at right angles without any shunting, and will carry 1000 lbs.

The B.E.V. battery rail locomotive (as described in 1920) was arranged with the battery boxes at either end and the controls in the middle. The wheelbase was 2ft 4in, and the length overall was 6 foot. Brakes applied to all 4 wheels, with the actuating linkage between the wheels. The motors were of specialised design for traction purposes with double wound fields "so that serial parallel control is arranged". The batteries consisted of 24 cells, size I.M.V. 6, with a capacity of 193 amp-hours. The cells were mounted in 4 hardwood boxes (pictures of later models in service show metal battery boxes). The range was 20 to 25 miles, with the rated speed being 6 mph unloaded and 5 mph loaded.

== Preservation ==
=== Preserved locomotives ===
There are currently 4 locomotives built by BEV known to be preserved. All have a very similar design, with cast iron frames, and the wheels driven from a single, central motor through reduction gearing to each axle. The cast side frames are of very similar designs, with the end castings being different to suit different gauges.

Works Number	Type	Year built	Gauge	Location
308	4wBE	1921	2 ft (610 mm)	Llechwedd Slate Cavern
323	4wBE	1921	2 ft (610 mm)	Alan Keef Ltd, Herefordshire
551	4wBE	1924	18 in (460 mm)	Private address, Derby
640	4wOHL	1926	2 ft (610 mm)	West Lancashire Light Railway
