= Rocker shovel loader =

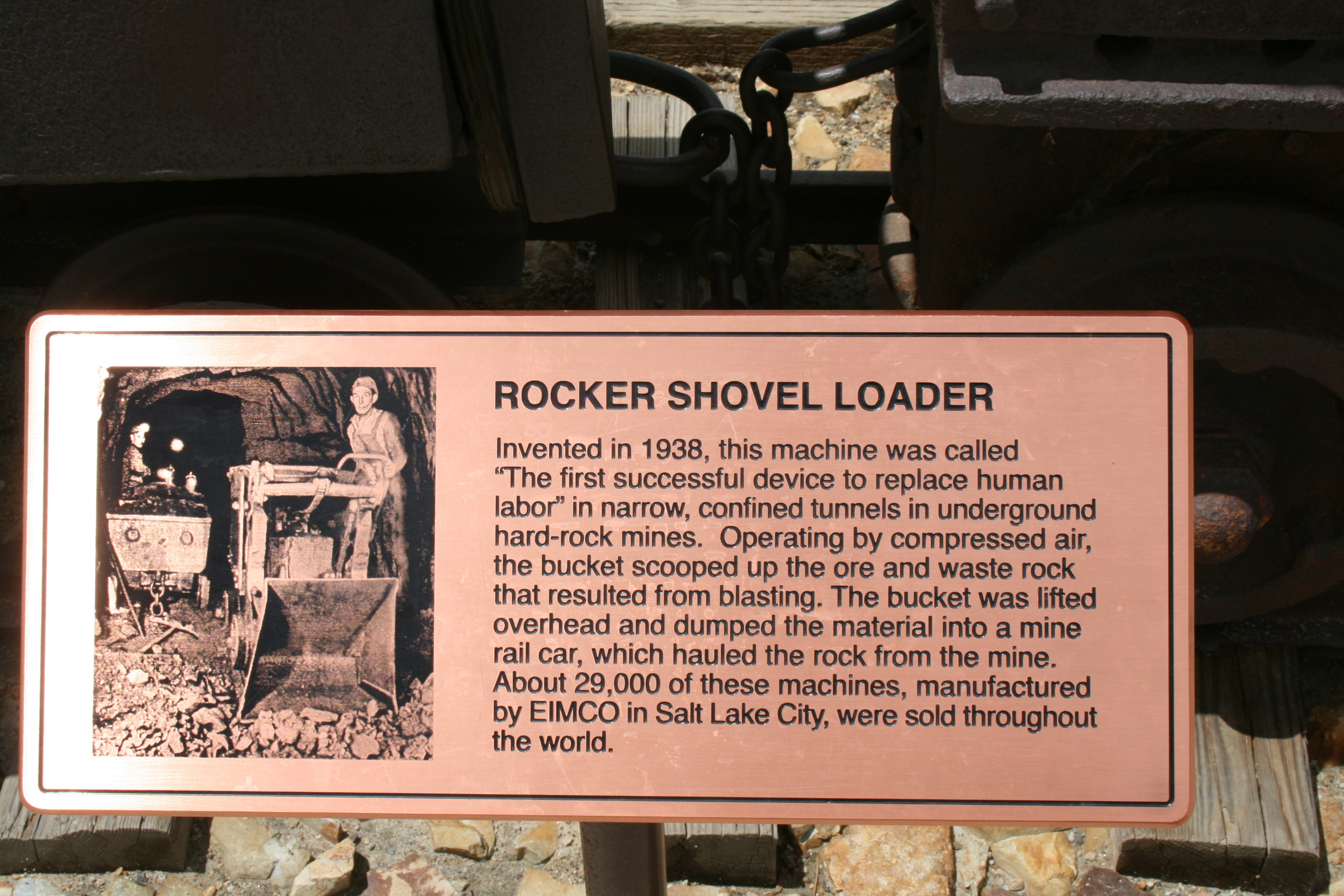
An engraved copper plaque next to a rocker shovel at Bingham Canyon Mine in Utah

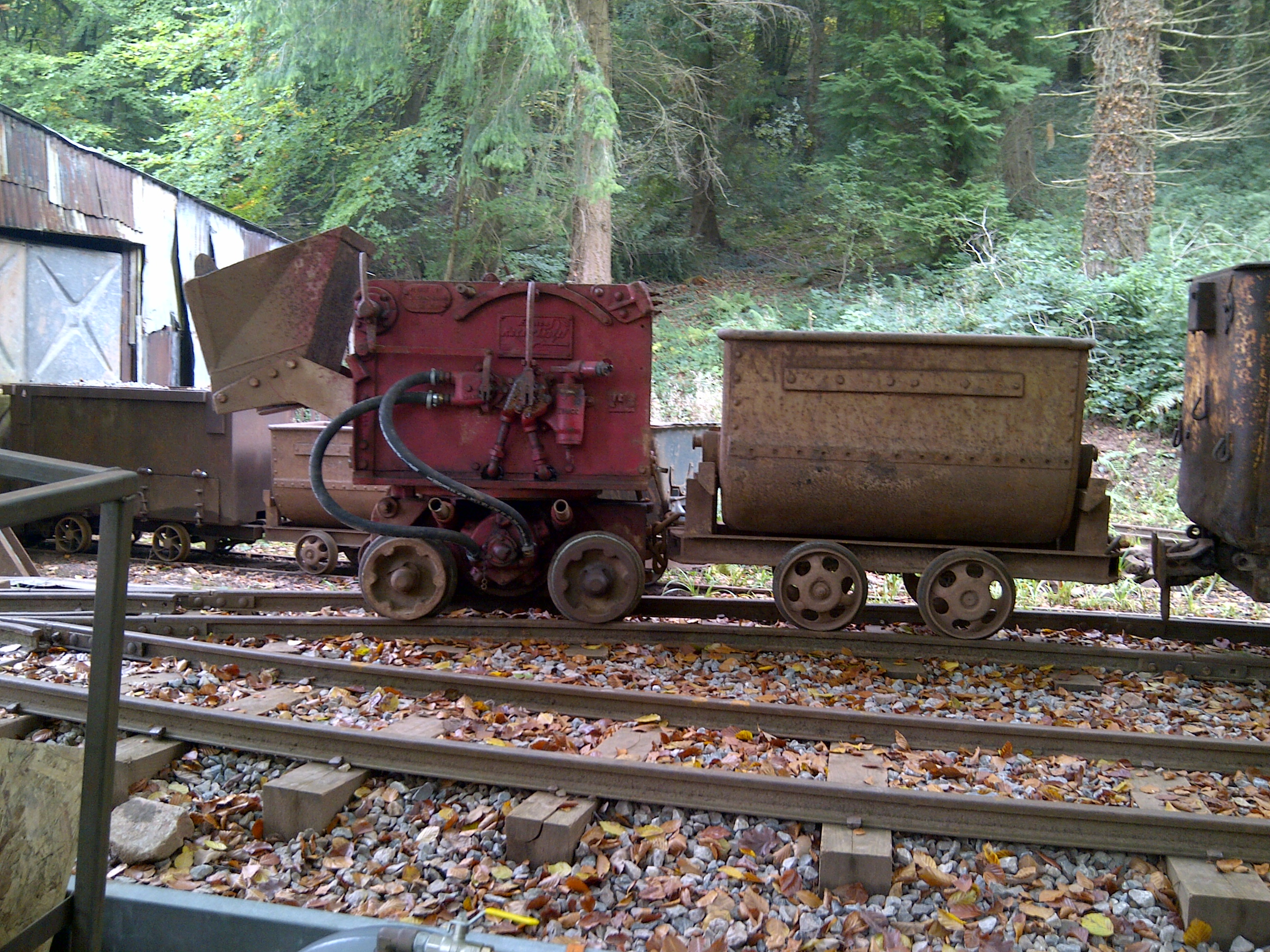
An EIMCO 12B in the passing loop at Lea Bailey Light Railway

A rocker shovel loader, sometimes simply referred to as a rocker shovel or mucker is a type of mechanical loader used in underground mining. A rocker shovel is usually powered by compressed air, or in some cases electricity. It is commonly mounted on steel wheels designed to run on narrow-gauge rails, with some later models using metal or rubber-tyred road wheels. The operator, standing on a raised platform to one side of the machine, operates the controls, a lever to drive the machine along the tracks, and another to raise and lower the bucket. Once the bucket has been filled by driving the loader forwards into the pile of material, the rocker mechanism throws the contents over the top of the machine and into a wagon which is behind. Once full, the loaded wagon can be taken away and replaced with an empty one to allow loading to continue.

On May 28, 1937, Edwin Burton Royle applied for a patent as the inventor of the "loading machine" and US Patent No. 2,134,582 was issued on October 25, 1938 and assigned to the Eastern Iron Metals Company (later to be known as EIMCO).

In 2000, the American Society of Mechanical Engineers added the EIMCO 12B Rocker Shovel Loader of 1938 to its List of Historic Mechanical Engineering Landmarks as reference number 212 out of 259 objects (as of 2015). In June 2012, an EIMCO 12B Rocker Shovel was featured in an episode of the reality television series Auction Hunters, filmed in Littleton, Colorado. It was sold to a former gold miner for $3,600 after being tested at Edgar Mine in Idaho Springs, Colorado.
