= River Inny =

River Inny may refer to the following rivers in Britain and Ireland:

- River Inny, Cornwall
- River Inny (County Kerry)
- River Inny (Leinster)
