= Innie (disambiguation) =

An innie is a concave navel.

Innie may also refer to:

- Innie, a colloquial name for a kind of vulva
- Innie, a kind of cell in killer sudoku
- Innie, an employee's workplace consciousness on the TV series Severance

== See also ==
- Inn (disambiguation)
- Inny (disambiguation)
