= Lea Bailey Light Railway =

Narrow-gauge heritage railway in the United Kingdom

Coordinates: 51°52′23.73″N 2°31′8.25″W

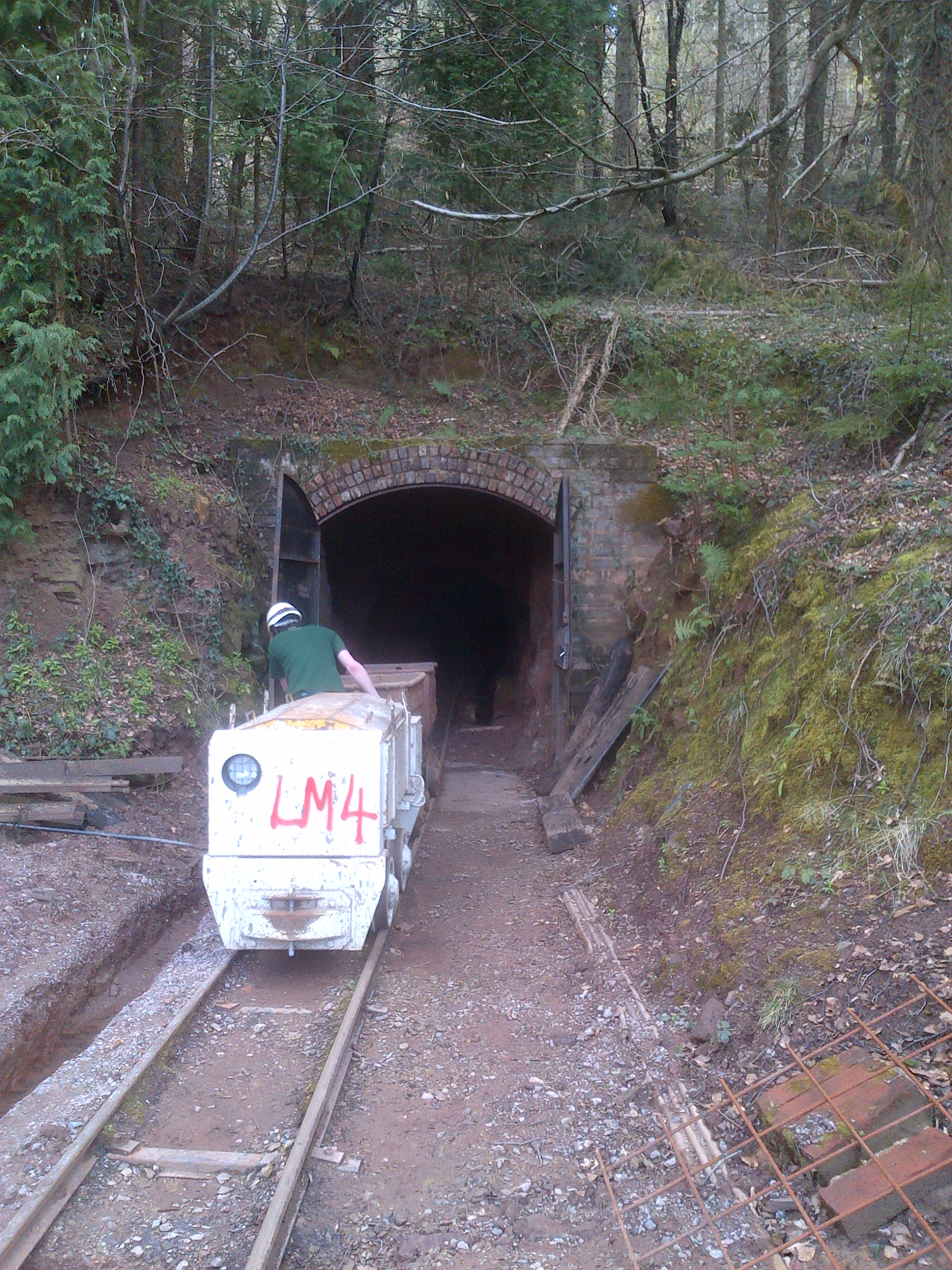
- WR8 locomotive shunting wagons into the mine
- Locale: England

Commercial operations
- Name: Mitcheldean Road & Forest of Dean Junction Railway
- Built by: Great Western Railway
- Original gauge: 4 ft 8 1/2 in (1,435 mm) standard gauge

Preserved operations
- Operated by: Lea Bailey Light Railway Society
- Length: 200 yards (183 m)
- Preserved gauge: 2 ft (610 mm)

Commercial history
- Opened: 1885
- Closed: 1917

Preservation history
- 2012: Work started at the Lea Bailey site

The Lea Bailey Light Railway is a 2 ft (610 mm) narrow-gauge heritage railway in the United Kingdom. It is built on the site of the Bailey Level Gold Mine.

An attempt was made in 2003 by the owners of Clearwell Caves to open the mine as a tourist attraction, but this was ultimately unsuccessful. In 2012, a small group from the Royal Forest of Dean Caving Club discovered the mine and a quantity of disused railway equipment and proposed to the owners that a volunteer-led project could start work on restoring the site. As of 2014, two locomotives and a number of wagons have been moved to Lea Bailey from storage at Clearwell Caves or the nearby Hawthorn Tunnel.

Part of the railway is laid on the trackbed of the disused Mitcheldean Road & Forest of Dean Junction Railway.

In 2013 the Lea Bailey Light Railway Society was formed; its members act as volunteers, undertaking all aspects of work on the site. A regular free newsletter is produced and sent out by e-mail.

== Locomotives ==
Name	Type	Builder	Works number	Date built	Arrived at Lea Bailey	Notes
	4wDM	Motor Rail	21282	1964	September 1993	Supplied to brickworks at Kempston Hardwick, then purchased by Alan Keef and sold to the Meirion Mill Railway in 1975. Returned to Alan Keef in late 1976, was sold on a peatworks where it worked until 1989. Then went to Lea Bailey.
	4w compressed air locomotive	Eimco	401–216			Ex-mining contractor in British Columbia. Re-gauged from 18 in (457 mm) gauge.

== Gallery ==
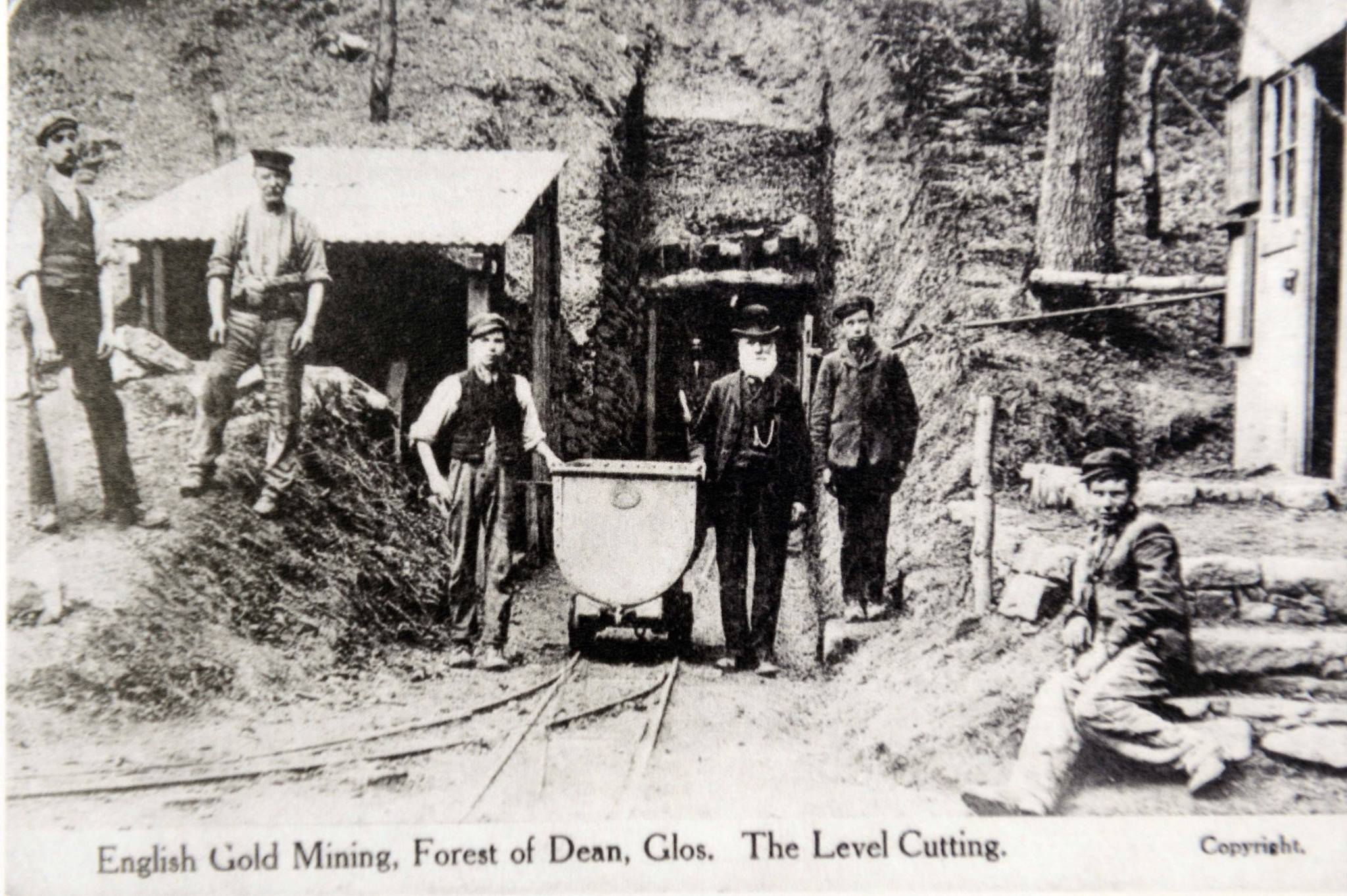
Postcard of the original Bailey Level gold mine

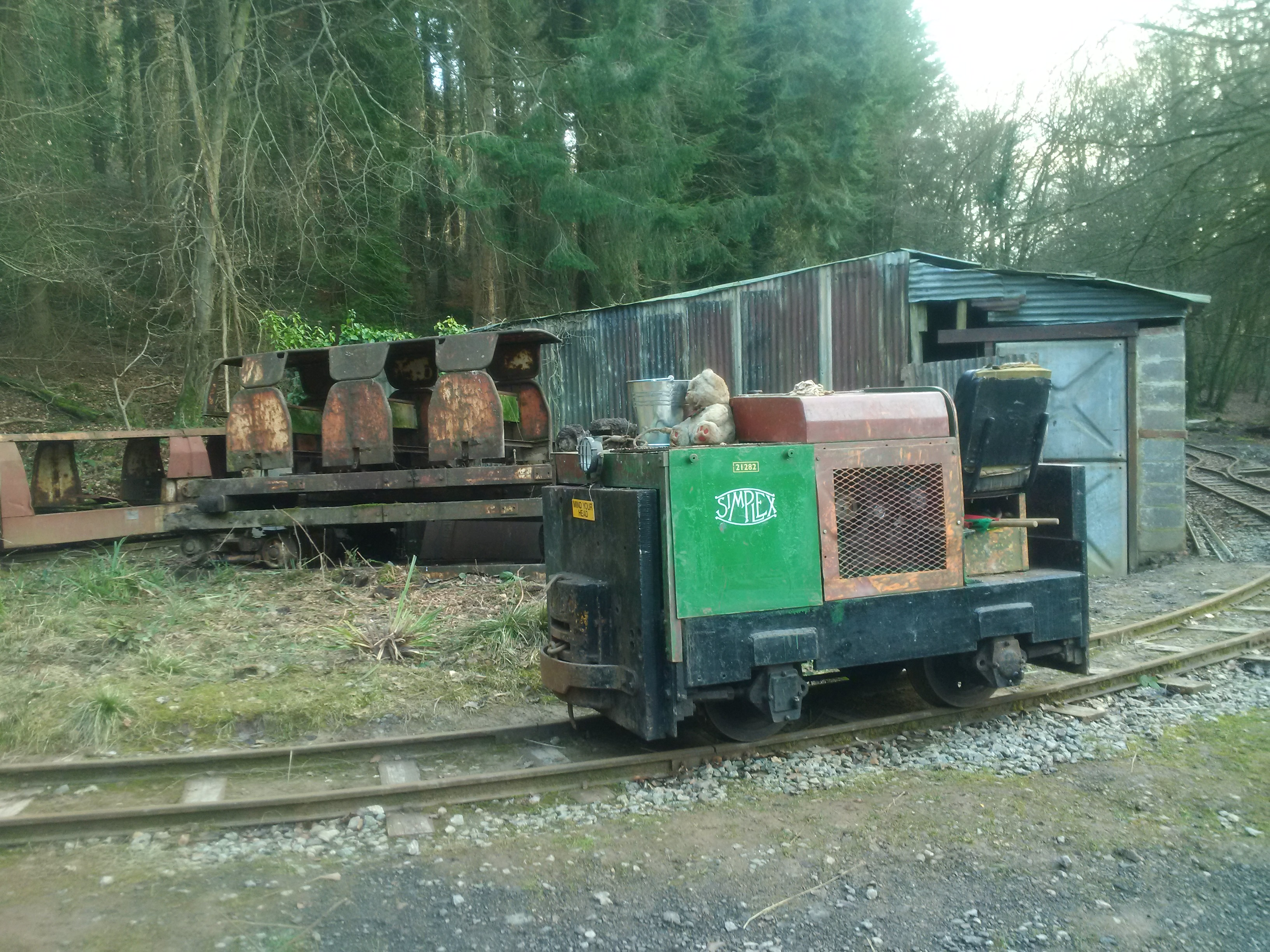
Motor Rail locomotive 21282 on the curve leading to the mine

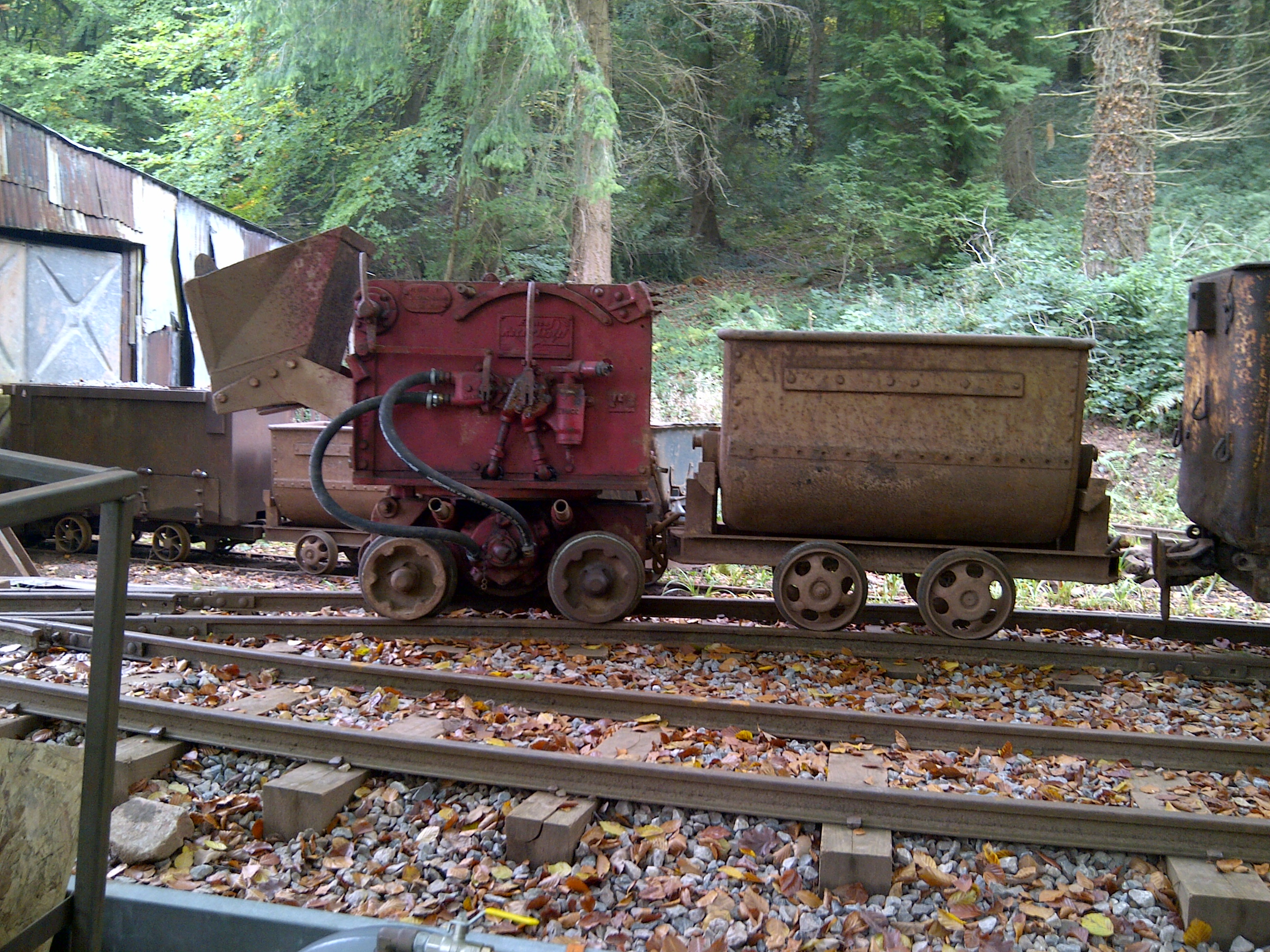
EIMCO 12b Rocker Shovel Loader in the passing loop

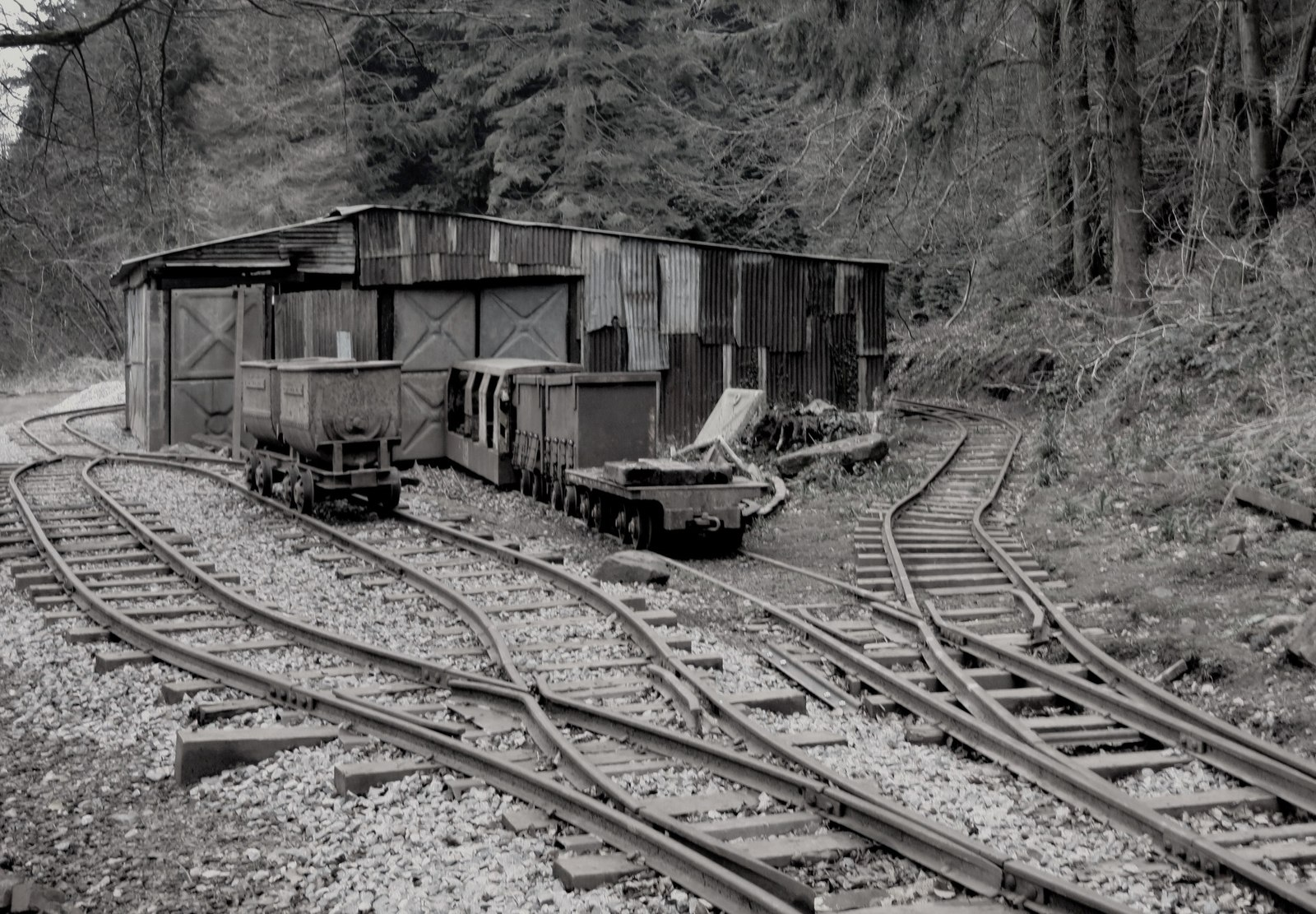
General view of the passing loop, shed and siding
