= Steam Mills =

Village in Gloucestershire, England

Coordinates: 51.839°N 2.512°W

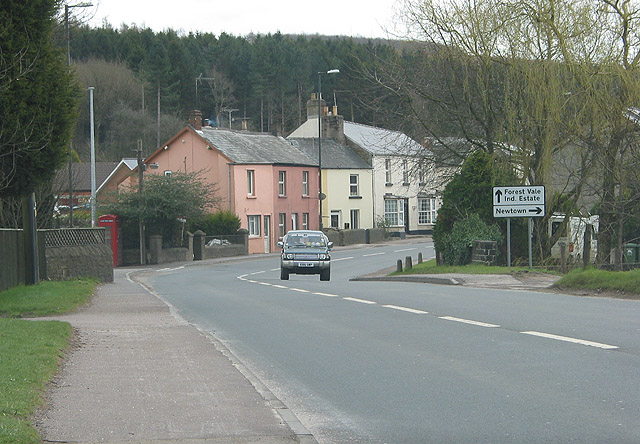

- Location within Gloucestershire
- OS grid reference: SO647157
- District: Forest of Dean
- Shire county: Gloucestershire
- Region: South West
- Country: England
- Sovereign state: United Kingdom
- Police: Gloucestershire
- Fire: Gloucestershire
- Ambulance: South Western
- UK Parliament: Forest of Dean

Steam Mills is a village in the Forest of Dean, west Gloucestershire, England.

During the 18th and 19th centuries there were local coal mines and a steam-powered mill, which lead to the name of the village. An engineering works was established in the 1880s to support the mining.

Today the village has an industrial park for businesses (including Freeminers Brewery, named after the Forest of Dean custom of free-mining), a petrol filling station and a carpet shop.

The village is home to Steam Mills Primary School designed by architect Alfred Smith.

The 5 acres (2.0 ha) lake is used for angling with Carp, Bream and Brown Trout being caught.
