= Inny Valley Railway =

English railway company

Overview
- Headquarters: Launceston
- Locale: England
- Dates of operation: 1968–1987

Technical
- Track gauge: 1 ft 10 3/4 in (578 mm)
- Length: 400 yards

The Inny Valley Railway was a private narrow gauge railway located at Trebullett, near Launceston in Cornwall, England. The railway was established by James Evans and ran around a field adjoining a workshop for the railway and a mill. Steam locomotives based at the railway were Velinheli built by Hunslet in 1886 and Sybil built by W.G. Bagnall in 1906, both previously in use at the Dinorwic Quarry. There was also a diesel locomotive built by Motor Rail and a passenger carriage built using redundant church pews. After closure the steam locomotives and carriage went to the Launceston Steam Railway whilst the diesel locomotive went to Alan Keef

== See also ==
- British narrow gauge railways
