= Stevington and Turvey Light Railway =

Coordinates: 52.163°N 0.618°W

The Stevington and Turvey Light Railway was a 2 ft (610 mm) narrow gauge light railway on the outskirts of the village of Turvey in Bedfordshire, England. It was about 3/4 mile (1.2 km) long. The railway was formed in the early 1980s by former members of The Surrey Light Railway which was based in Hersham, Surrey. The railway was established on the former track bed of the Bedford to Northampton Line. The main signal box on the line was named Needham, and contains a 31 lever Westinghouse 'L' frame which originally came from Battersea Park Signal box.

The line closed in 2014, with the operations moving to Woburn.

== Rolling stock ==
- Orenstein & Koppel RL1C 4wDM works number 7728 of 1935.
