= Wingrove & Rogers =

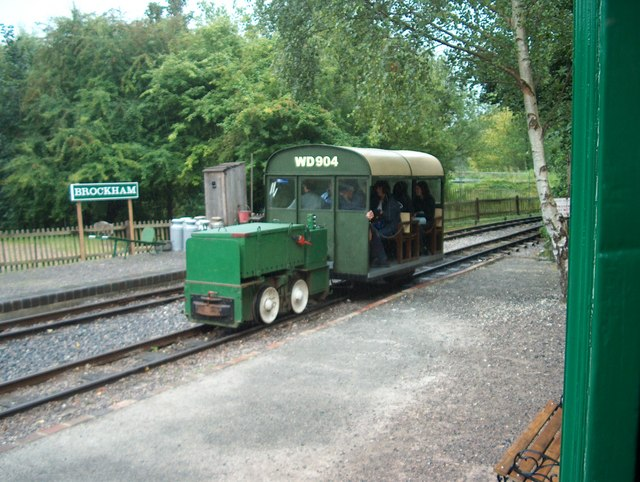
Wingrove & Rogers battery-electric locomotive No. 4998 at Amberley Museum Railway.

Wingrove & Rogers Ltd of Kirkby, Liverpool, England, was formed in 1919 by Major Charles William Wingrove M.C. (1889-1976) and William Rogers (b1891) to manufacture control gear for electric vehicles. In the 1920s they diversified into variable capacitors, the components essential for tuning in the front end of radio receivers which they continued through the Second World War during which they supplied the armed forces. In 1926 they amalgamated with British Electric Vehicles Ltd, and moved the electric vehicle production from Southport to Liverpool where they made vehicles such as electrically motorised trolleys and electric locomotives (mainly narrow gauge), largely for use in factories, mines, and by tunnelling contractors.

The radio component part of the business was run under a subsidiary, Polar Ltd, formed in 1925. In mid-1928 they opened the Polar Works and they used the "Polar" trademark for the variable capacitors. The Polar business was sold off to Jackson Brothers (London) Ltd of Croydon at the end of 1980, having lost money in 8 of the previous 9 years. The contents of the Polar Works were auctioned on 12 February 1981.

Wingrove & Rogers sold their electric vehicle and locomotive business to Pikrose & Co Ltd in 1989, and then the company was put into voluntary liquidation. Pikrose were a long established firm founded by Austin Hopkinson in the 1900s making equipment for the mining industry at their Delta works in Audenshaw, Manchester, and they continued the manufacture of the battery electric locomotives with surviving examples known from 1992 and 1993 - one is preserved at the Apedale Valley Light Railway. In 2006 Pikrose sold the B.E.V. business to Serminsa (of Peru) who have continued production of the locomotives.

== Products ==
William Rogers patented a controller for electric vehicles in June 1919, and about the same time he teamed up with Charles William Wingrove to form Wingrove & Rogers Ltd. Their company manufactured the controller used on the electric vehicles manufactured by British Electric Vehicles of Southport.

In 1922 the company started patenting items associated with radio tuning such as variable condensers, and this became an important part of the business, with several related patents until the advent of World War II, and production for the armed forces during the war.

After amalgamating with British Electric Vehicles in 1926 they produced electrically powered factory trolleys, and narrow gauge railway locomotives, used in factories and mines. In 1929 it was also reported that they marketed electric road vehicles made by Victor Electrics Ltd of Southport. By the 1960s their range of products had extended to include fork lift trucks and pallet trucks.

The locomotive type designations were based on weight :

- 1.5ton Types WR5 and WR5L
- 2 Ton Type WR8
- 3-3.5 Ton Type WR18
- 5 Ton Type W527
- 7-8 Ton Type W128

== Preserved Vehicles ==
These simple battery locomotives were some of the last narrow gauge locomotives to be made, and some are still in industrial use. Their preservation largely came after the steam and internal combustion locomotives had been preserved with the realisation that they are also a part of the same story and need to be represented in collections.

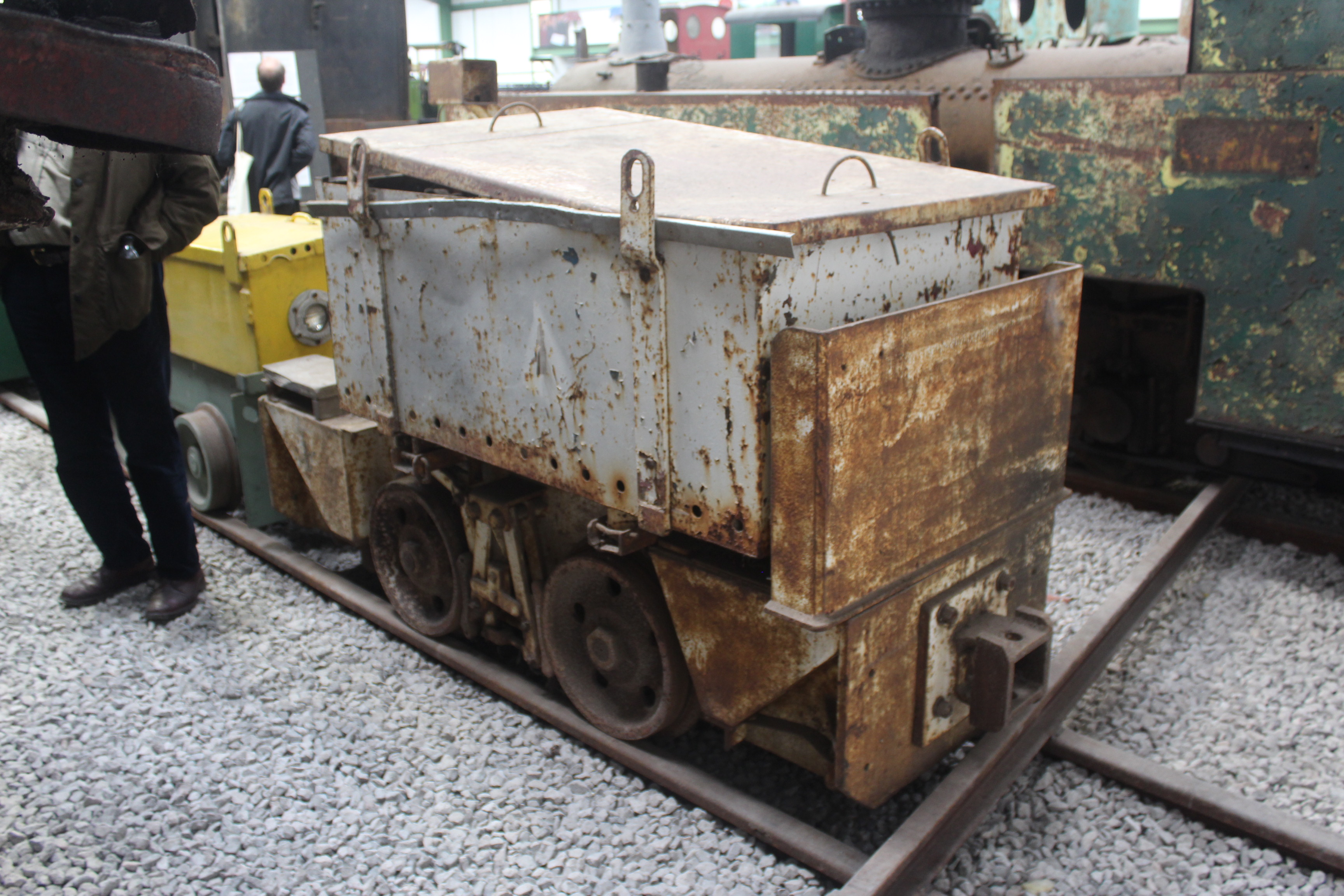
Wingrove & Rogers 6092

Name	Works Number	Year built	Type	Gauge	Previous Operator	Notes
	899	1935		22.5in		At Dolaucothi Gold Mines, Pumsaint
	1298	1938		2 ft (610 mm)		Moseley Industrial NG Tramway & Museum
	3492	1946		2 ft (610 mm)	Sallet Hole Fluorspar Mine	Wakebridge Station Tram Stop, Crich
	3557	1946	W227	2 ft (610 mm)	Force Crag Baryte Mine	Preserved in 2007, at the Springfield Agricultural Railway
	3805			2 ft 6 in (762 mm)	RNAD Trecwn	Scapa Flow Visitor Centre, Lyness
	3867	1950		2 ft (610 mm)		Poldark Mine & Cornish National Heritage Collection
	4998	1953		2 ft (610 mm)	Redland Brick Ltd, North Holmwood, Dorking, Surrey	At Amberley Chalk Pits Museum
Lama	5033	1953		2 ft (610 mm)	Ex Crowborough Brickworks	At Great Bush Railway
	5034	1953		2 ft (610 mm)	Redland Brick Ltd, North Holmwood, Dorking, Surrey	At Amberley Chalk Pits Museum
Mary	5665	1957		2 ft (610 mm)		Preserved at the Morwellham & Tamar Valley Trust, Morwellham Quay
	6092	1958		2 ft 6 in (762 mm)	Beckermet Mining Co	Preserved at the Statfold Barn Railway
Bertha	6298	1960		2 ft (610 mm)		Preserved at the Morwellham & Tamar Valley Trust, Morwellham Quay
LM19	6502	1962		2 ft (610 mm)	Originally Balfour Beatty Ltd, contractors, Blackwell, London	Oswestry and District Narrow Gauge Group
	6503	1962		2 ft (610 mm)	Originally Balfour Beatty Ltd, contractors, Blackwell, London	Oswestry and District Narrow Gauge Group
	6504	1962		2 ft (610 mm)	Originally Balfour Beatty Ltd, contractors, Blackwell, London	Oswestry and District Narrow Gauge Group
	6505	1962		2 ft (610 mm)	Originally Balfour Beatty Ltd, contractors, Blackwell, London	Oswestry and District Narrow Gauge Group
Cable Mill	C6716	1963		2 ft (610 mm)	Cable Street Rolling Mills, Wolverhampton	Preserved at the Apedale Valley Light Railway
Billet	C6717	1963		2 ft (610 mm)	Cable Street Rolling Mills, Wolverhampton	Preserved at the Apedale Valley Light Railway
	C6766	1963		2 ft (610 mm)		Preserved at the Threlkeld Quarry and Mining Museum
Ludo	6769	1964		2 ft (610 mm)		Preserved at the Morwellham & Tamar Valley Trust, Morwellham Quay
William	6770	1964		2 ft (610 mm)		Preserved at the Morwellham & Tamar Valley Trust, Morwellham Quay
Harewood	D6800	1964		2 ft (610 mm)		Preserved at the Morwellham & Tamar Valley Trust, Morwellham Quay
	D6912	1964		2 ft (610 mm)	Spondon Power Station, Derby	Preserved at the Apedale Valley Light Railway
Charlotte	G7124	1967		2 ft (610 mm)		Preserved at the Morwellham & Tamar Valley Trust, Morwellham Quay
S259 George	H7197	1968		2 ft (610 mm)		Preserved at the Morwellham & Tamar Valley Trust, Morwellham Quay
Titch	M7535	1972		2 ft (610 mm)	Ex Crowborough Brickworks	At Great Bush Railway
	M7550	1972		2 ft (610 mm)		Preserved at the Twyford Waterworks Trust
LM4	N7605	1973	WR8	2 ft (610 mm)		Preserved at the Lea Bailey Light Railway
	N7606	1973		2 ft (610 mm)		Preserved at the Twyford Waterworks Trust
	7617	1973	WR5L	18 in (457 mm)		Preserved at the Lea Bailey Light Railway
	P7624	1975		2 ft (610 mm)		Preserved at the Threlkeld Quarry & Mining Museum
	7888R	1977	WR18	2 ft (610 mm)		Preserved at the Lea Bailey Light Railway
	7964	1977	WR18	2 ft (610 mm)	Redburn flourspar mine	Preserved at the Lea Bailey Light Railway
	T8033	1979		2 ft (610 mm)	Redland Brick Ltd, North Holmwood, Dorking, Surrey	At Amberley Chalk Pits Museum
	L1009	1979	WR5	2 ft (610 mm)	Originally Concord Tin Mines, Truro, then Carnarvon Mining Co. Ltd., Clogau Gold Mine	Preserved at the Lea Bailey Light Railway (stripped for repairs)
Diode	L1021	1983		2 ft (610 mm)		Moseley Industrial NG Tramway & Museum
