= Mitcheldean Road and Forest of Dean Junction Railway =

Independent railway company in England

Coordinates: 51.79°N 2.54°W

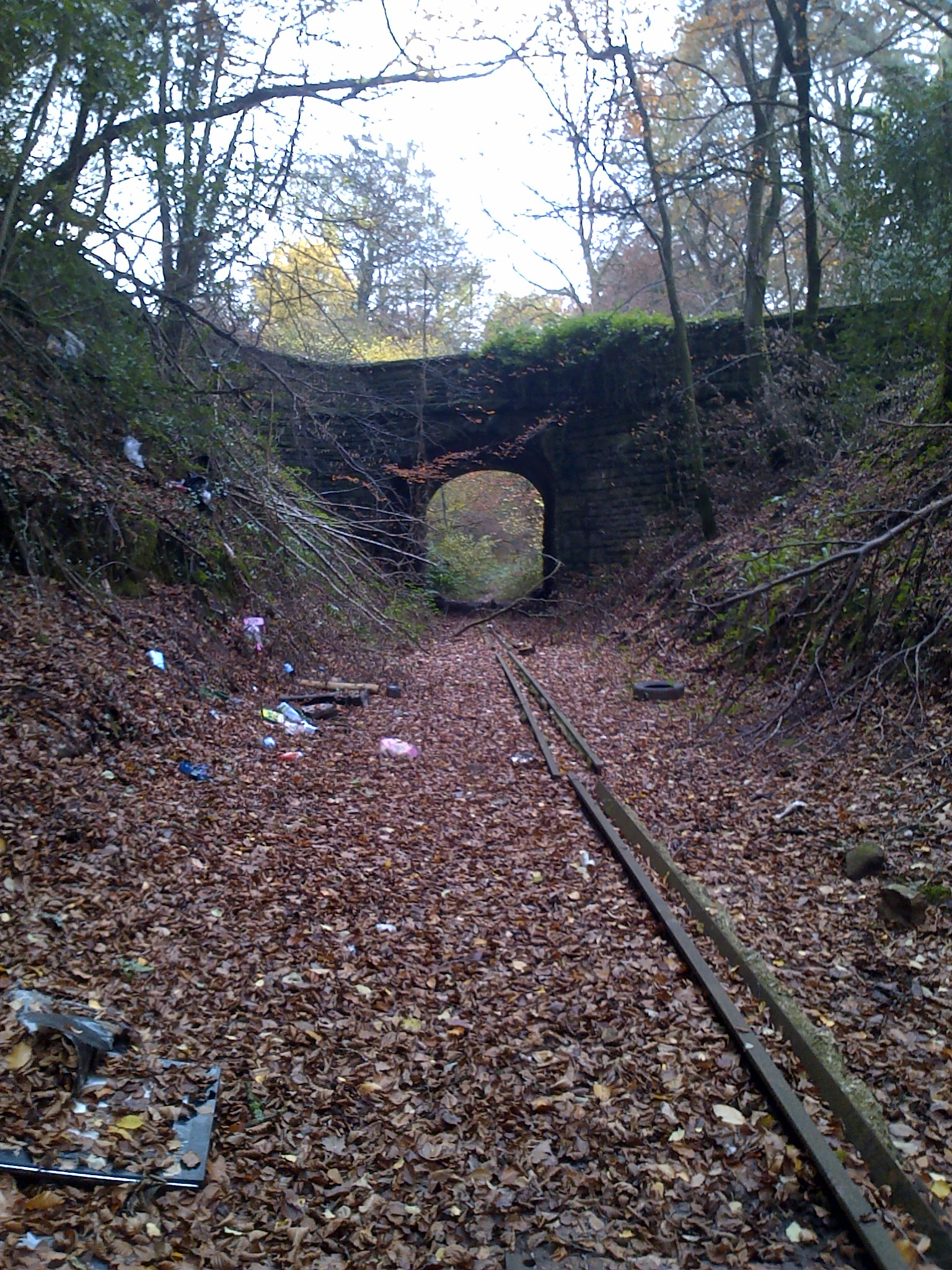
A bridge carrying the road from Lea Bailey to Drybrook over the former trackbed of the Railway

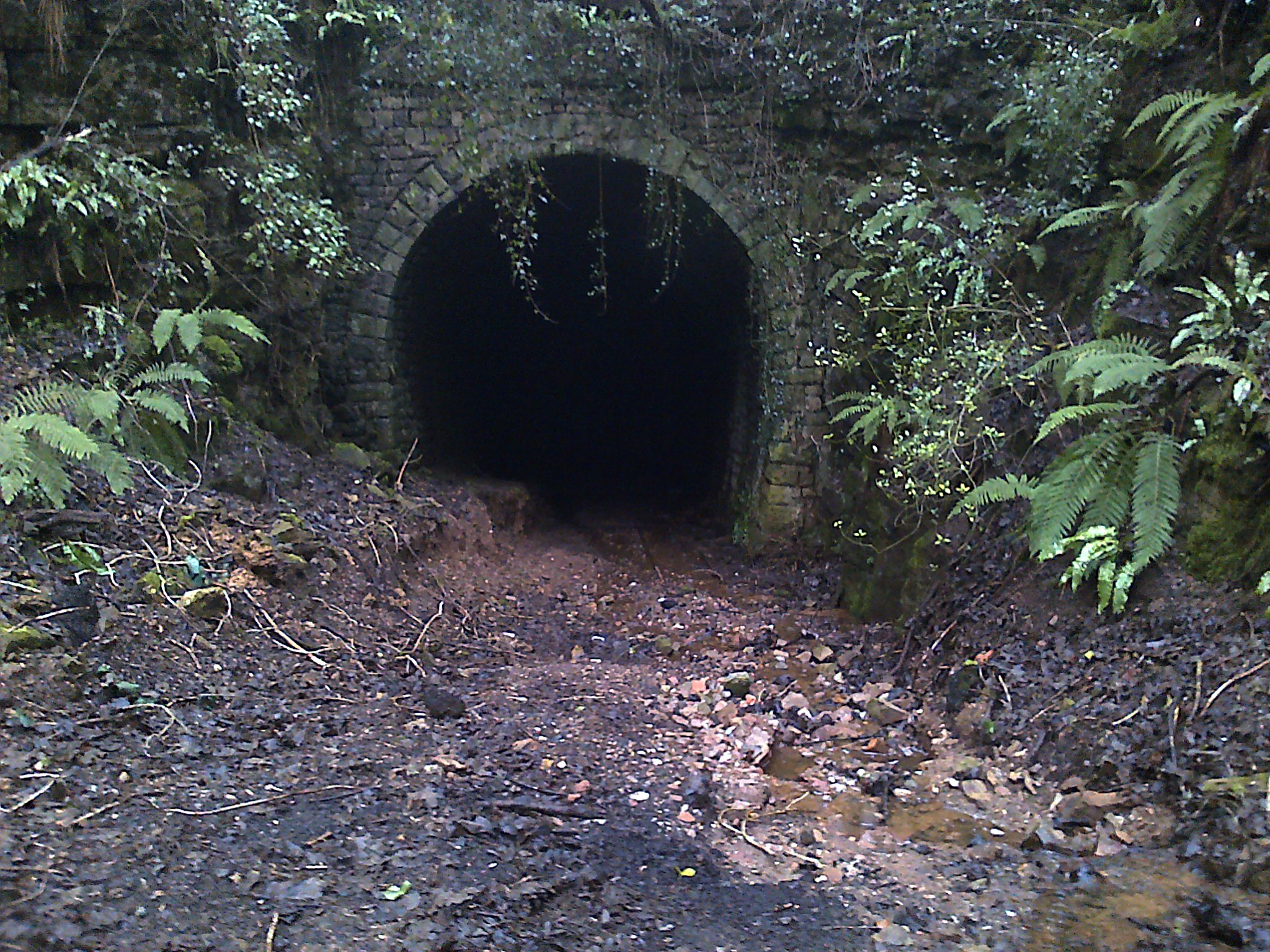
South portal of the 638 yards (583 m) Hawthorne Tunnel near Drybrook.

The Mitcheldean Road and Forest of Dean Junction Railway was an independent railway company incorporated in 1871, to provide a northerly outlet for iron ore and coal products from the Cinderford and Whimsey area in the Forest of Dean, to the Hereford, Ross and Gloucester Railway line; mineral traffic to industrial centres in South Wales and the Midlands was foreseen.

The company ran out of money during construction, and the Great Western Railway purchased it and completed the line about 1882. By then the intended mineral flows were being adequately handled on other routes, and the GWR did not open the line to traffic, although in 1885 a short length at the southern end was opened to connect mineral workings.

The line remained dormant until in 1907 the Great Western Railway introduced a service of railmotor passenger trains, opening several low-cost stopping places on the line as far north as Drybrook Halt. The service was successful at first but declined later, closing in 1930. Ammunition was stored in the disused tunnel on the line during World War II, but later use was confined to a bitumen plant near Whimsey, and the line closed completely in 1967.

== Background ==
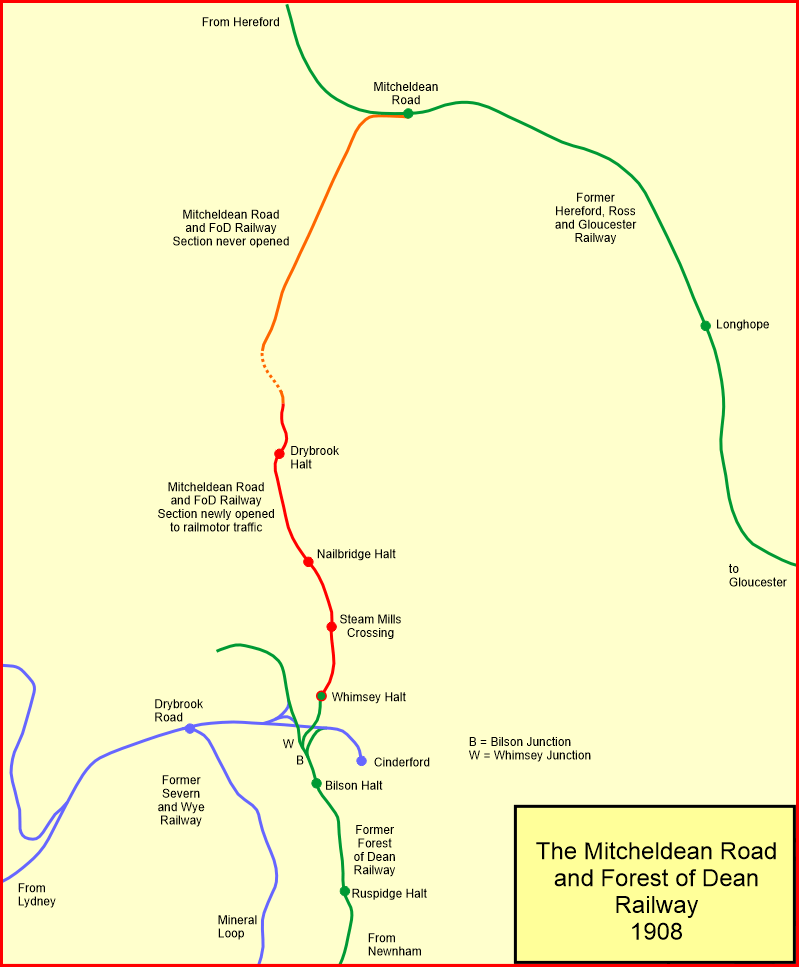
System map of the former Mitcheldean Road and Forest of Dean Railway in 1908

The considerable iron and coal wealth of the Forest of Dean, coupled with exceptionally poor road facilities, had encouraged the promotion of tramways to convey the heavy minerals to market. At first this was locally focussed, and then conveyance to waterway transport became important.

In the early 1840s the Great Western Railway (GWR) was sponsoring the Monmouth and Hereford Railway, to build a line from Standish, south-east of Gloucester, to Hereford via Ross-on-Wye, with a southward branch line from Lea, near Mitcheldean, to Whimsey, near Cinderford. At the time Whimsey was an important centre of the mineral extraction industry in the Forest of Dean. The Monmouth and Hereford Railway was incorporated by the Monmouth and Hereford Railway Act 1845 (8 & 9 Vict. c. cxci), but limited in scope by Parliament, and the powers were not exercised. However, in 1851 the Hereford, Ross and Gloucester Railway received its authorising act of Parliament, the Hereford, Ross and Gloucester Railway Act 1851 (14 & 15 Vict. c. xl), and it opened a line on a similar alignment from Hereford to Grange Court on 1 June 1855. The GWR itself built the connecting section from Grange Court to Gloucester, and the South Wales Railway opened its line progressively from Grange Court to Chepstow.

The South Wales Railway took over the Forest of Dean Railway (FoDR), successor to the Bullo Pill Railway, which had been built as a tramway. The South Wales Railway converted part of the FoDR network to a broad gauge railway branch, and this was completed to Whimsey in 1854. It was realised that Whimsey was close to the Mitcheldean Road station of the Hereford, Ross and Gloucester Railway, and a branch connection would give a useful northward and westward outlet to South Wales industrial sites and to the West Midlands for the minerals of Whimsey, and on 29 November 1856 details were published of a proposed Forest of Dean Central, Lydbrook & Hereford, Ross & Gloucester Junction Railway. This was to extend the Forest of Dean Central Railway northwards to Mitcheldean Road and later to Ledbury; but in fact nothing came of the idea.

== A viable scheme at last ==
The plan was dormant for several years until 1870 when a bill was deposited in for the "Mitcheldean Road and Whimsey Railway". The terrain was extremely difficult, and the line would climb from Mitcheldean Road at 1 in 30 and 1 in 34 to a summit near Drybrook, and then descend at 1 in 40 towards Whimsey.

At first the line was opposed by the Great Western Railway and the Severn and Wye Railway, both of which regarded it as a threat to their traffic. On 22 May 1871 a meeting was held at Paddington between GWR directors, an S&WR deputation and Alfred and Thomas Goold, representing the Mitcheldean Road concern. The Goolds claimed that the line was necessary for the development of the iron ore at Drybrook, Westbury Brook and Wigpool, and said that if the S&WR had given any assurance that it would be constructing its Lydbrook Valley line in the near future, the bill would never have been promoted. The GWR offered to accommodate the traffic and to reimburse the expenses of the bill, but the promoters declined. The GWR then declared its implacable opposition to the scheme, but a select committee of the House of Lords gave the GWR and S&WR short shrift, finding that they had no proper grounds for opposition, and the bill went forward smoothly.

Mitcheldean Road and Forest of Dean Junction Railway Act 1871
- Act of Parliament
- Parliament of the United Kingdom
- Long title: An Act for making a Railway from the Hereford, Ross, and Gloucester Railway, at Mitcheldean Road, to the Whimsey Branch of the Forest of Dean Railway; and other purposes.
- Citation: 34 & 35 Vict. c. cxv

Dates
- Royal assent: 13 July 1871

Text of statute as originally enacted

The name of the incorporated company was changed slightly, and the Mitcheldean Road and Forest of Dean Junction Railway Act 1871 (34 & 35 Vict. c. cxv) was passed on 13 July 1871. The company had powers to build a railway 4 miles 5 furlongs in length from Mitcheldean Road station to the Forest of Dean Railway branch at Whimsey. The capital was £30,000 in £10 shares, and there were borrowing powers for £10,000. The GWR was authorised to subscribe up to half the capital. Five years were allowed for completion of the line; there was no mention of carrying passengers. The engineer's estimate for construction was £28,268, no stations being envisaged. The company was authorised to enter into agreements with the GWR for working and maintaining the line. By the time of the act of Parliament, the Hereford, Ross and Gloucester Railway line was standard gauge but the Forest of Dean Railway branch was still broad gauge, giving the Mitcheldean Road company a significant, but temporary, commercial advantage, in that onward transit of loaded wagons did not require transshipment.

== Construction difficulties ==
The first ordinary meeting of the company on 13 January 1872 was abortive as only the Goolds were present and there was no quorum, so that no business could be transacted. At a shareholders’ meeting on 8 May it was decided to ask the GWR to work the line for 55% instead of the agreed 60% of the receipts, if the ruling gradient was reduced by substituting a tunnel at the summit for the cutting originally proposed. A ruling gradient of 1 in 35 was now to be achieved, by construction of a 638-yard Euroclydon tunnel, as well as another tunnel 97 yards in length and a very deep cutting at Drybrook. (Note: The business calculation was therefore that a moderately long tunnel would be paid for by a 5% margin on forward expenses.)

At a meeting on 6 June 1873 the proposed working agreement with the GWR was adopted. The tender for construction of the line by Miller & Roberts in the sum of £30,000 was accepted. G Wells Owen was the company's engineer. Construction began in 1874 and in May the secretary, Thomas Goold, and Alfred Goold, having walked over the line, suggested that the tunnel should be lengthened and a deviation made at Drybrook. This was agreed, and Crown sanction was received for the changes on 2 July 1874.

Relations between the company and the contractor were unhappy, and there were complaints about slow progress and counter-claims about obstruction. The company engineer's assistant Coulthard had "ordered the North heading of the tunnel to be stopped in consequence of an error in his engineering by which the tunnel had been driven out of its proper course past the No. 1 shaft without touching it". The outcome of all this was the contractor's abandonment of the work.

The company took over the work, and on 10 December Coulthard reported that a shaft, abandoned because the contractor could not complete its sinking, had been finished by him within three days and had struck the tunnel only 3 inches out of line instead of 7 feet off as the contractor had forecast. By 29 February 1876 considerable progress had been made and work was expected to be finished by July or August. This proved considerably optimistic, but in August 1876 it was reported that "The Mitcheldean Road and Whimsey Railroad is so far progressing that it is expected that the line will be completed by December next, when it is proposed to open it; it is intended to carry passengers as well as mineral traffic".

This forecast too proved unreliable, and on 20 July 1877 the directors decided to dispense with Coulthard's services, as he had misled them as to the time of completion and cost. W G Owen estimated that well over £5,000 was needed to complete the line. A new contractor, Griffiths of Lydney was approached to take over the work, but he declined. A Mr Harris then took over supervision of the works but, owing to some misunderstanding, dismissed all the workmen so that work had stopped entirely by mid-September except in the tunnel. On 9 October 1877 W G Owen reported that £12,000 would still be required to complete it.

== Taken over by the Great Western Railway ==
By now the £10,000 from the GWR had been swallowed up, with little to show for it, and the GWR demanded an inspection of the accounts. On 18 October, Hadingham, the company clerk, travelled to London with the books, and GWR officials began to reaudit the accounts. When they wrote to Thomas Goold for various documents and bills to help them in their task he decided to call a halt. He pointed out that the GWR had two seats on the board, but that their nominees had never attended a meeting, and if they were to allow the GWR to audit their accounts they might have to extend the same facility to all other shareholders.

Nevertheless, the company itself was incapable of progressing the construction, and by early 1878 the GWR had made traffic and working agreements with the company, and the Great Western Railway Act 1878 (41 & 42 Vict. c. ccviii) of 22 July 1878 enabled the GWR to subscribe a further £20,000 to the undertaking. Daniel Gooch of the GWR became the company chairman and board meetings were held at Paddington instead of at Newnham. Still the line lay moribund for some two years until the GWR took over completely. An act of Parliament of 6 August 1880 authorised the GWR to absorb the undertaking and to complete the line, which it did at a further cost of £21,626, making a total cost to the GWR of £60,626. Still with the line completed, the GWR made no attempt to open it to traffic: economic depression dominated the Forest economy; moreover the completion of the S&WR Lydbrook extension provided a much more direct outlet for traffic from the northern part of the Forest to South Wales.

By now the GWR was well established in the southern and eastern part of the Forest, and a northern outlet was less important. Workings in the southern part of the originally planned route could conveniently be given a southerly connection, and about a mile at that end was opened for mineral traffic in July 1885, from Speedwell Siding down to Whimsey.

== Passenger trains at the southern end ==
In 1906 the Great Western Railway had achieved much success in introducing rail-motors, sometimes known as auto-trains, on existing lines. The system was to provide low-cost stopping places at hitherto unserved points on existing lines. The railmotors were either a combined passenger carriage and small integrated steam engine power unit, or later, a small separate locomotive. In either case control of the engine from the remote end of the vehicle was possible, avoiding the necessity of running round the train at terminals.

The population of the more remote areas around Drybrook, families of miners mostly, agitated for such a service on their mineral line:

The success of rail motor services on many hitherto unremunerative branch lines has brought to the front the possibility of re-opening abandoned lines to be worked on the new method. The Great Western Railway have been asked to establish a motor service on the Whimsey branch, between Mitcheldean Road and Cinderford. The Whimsey line was constructed some years ago by a company, which, finding they had not enough capital to work it successfully, sold it to the Great Western Railway in expectation that they would work it, but they decided to keep it closed. The Great Western Railway have replied to the petitioners that they are afraid that the possibility of getting a reasonable return for such service is not such as would justify the heavy capital expense that would be involved, and as the population served only numbers about 9,000, the caution of the railway in the matter appears perfectly justifiable.

In fact in 1907 the system was introduced on the old Bullo Pill line from Newnham and on the lower part of the Whimsey line as far as Steam Mills Crossing on 3 August 1907. 20,824 passengers were carried in the first six weeks, including 3,319 on the August Bank Holiday. A further 41 chains of the Mitcheldean Road route was opened on 4 November 1907, from Speedwell to Drybrook. The GWR had been asked to establish a passenger service between Mitcheldean Road and Cinderford, over the whole of the Mitcheldean Road route, but the GWR saw that the financial return would not justify the heavy capital expense as the population to be served was very limited.

The 1922 Bradshaw public timetable shows "Auto-cars – one class only" between Newnham and Drybrook Halt. There are departures at 08:25, 11:30, 14:40 (not continuing beyond Cinderford except on Saturdays), 17:36, 19:50 (not continuing beyond Cinderford on Thursdays and Saturday), and 21:18 (Thursdays and Saturdays only). Intermediate stations between Newnham and Drybrook Halt were Cinderford and Whimsey Halt, and there were halts at Steam Mills Crossing and Nailbridge between Whimsey and Drybrook.

There was no direct route from Cinderford station northwards, and the northbound trains must have run to Bilson Junction (that is, towards Newnham), reversing there to continue northwards. The publicly advertised journey time from Cinderford to Whimsey Halt was 8 minutes; the distance is less than a mile.

The passenger service from Cinderford to Drybrook was withdrawn from 7 July 1930.

== Abandonment of the north end ==
The running track had been laid throughout the route to Mitcheldean Road, and was maintained for many years by the Great Western Railway (GWR). At Mitcheldean Road the line terminated in the goods yard; to enter it from the station required two reversals and the short terminal neck would have prevented a long train from using the line, as well as precluding any possibility of a run at the 1 in 38 bank.

The rails between Drybrook Quarry and Mitcheldean Road were taken up between 8 and 17 February 1917, in common with those on many disused and lightly used branches, the track being in demand in France during World War I. During World War II, Euroclydon tunnel (so named by Paar; Cooke calls it Drybrook Tunnel; Maggs calls it Hawthorns Tunnel) was used by the Admiralty for storing ammunition.

An ammunition train was sent to the location by the Admiralty without prior arrangement with the GWR; the GWR informed the Admiralty that the track into the tunnel was not usable, and proper arrangements had to be made hastily. In due course narrow gauge track was laid from what became Admiralty Siding into the tunnel. Daily train movements took place for a time. The ammunition usage ceased after the cessation of hostilities; in 1957 the tunnel was used briefly for the cultivation of mushrooms.

In 1959 Berry Wiggins established a bitumen plant at Whimsey, immediately south of Steam Mills Crossing. Bitumen was loaded away from the depot. The last such consignment was on 1 May 1967 and the stub of the branch closed on 1 August 1967.

== Description of the route ==
Writing originally in 1965, Paar said "The whole route can still be followed. Beginning in Mitcheldean Road station yard the line immediately began to climb at 1 in 38, curving south-west and crossing two lanes, the first by an underbridge and the second on the level. It continued to climb along a wooded hillside, crossed over a track by a wooden bridge now dismantled, and under a road by a stone arch bridge. After just over two miles the line entered Euroclydon tunnel, which took its name from Euroclydon House on the hill above. The steep gradient continued through the tunnel to the summit where, in 2 1/2 miles, the line had climbed 321 feet. Thence it fell at 1 in 42 and 1 in 54 through the short Drybrook tunnel, and continued south to Whimsey where it made an end-on junction with the Forest of Dean Branch."

Paar described the line from Whimsey to Drybrook in the reverse direction: Whimsey was the terminus of the branch (from Bullo Pill) from 1854 until the Mitcheldean Road line was built. After lying unused for some years, the section from Whimsey to Speedwell sidings was opened by the GWR in July 1885. Steam Mills halt was on the up side beyond a level crossing, after which came a shallow embankment, a bridge across the tramroad, an unusual joint bridge taking the Trafalgar tramway and the railway under a road, a skew girder bridge across the tramway, and Nailbridge halt (up side). Immediately beyond the halt was a bridge carrying the Drybrook road, followed by Speedwell siding, a loop to the running line, serving the Speedwell Newbridge level. Though officially closed in 1897, activity continued thereafter and the siding connections were not finally taken out of use until 6 January 1938.

Subsequently, the product of quarry operations was the commercial traffic of the line. After the Second World War rail traffic to and from the quarries dwindled, and ceased in February 1953. The line was severed north of Whimsey as there was no other traffic. Early in 1957 track lifting was completed from Drybrook to Steam Mills.

In 1924, the development of Harrow Hill colliery, on the up side, led to the provision of two new sidings, with connections at both ends. North of Speedwell, the Mitcheldean line remained out of use until opened in 1907 for rail-motor services to Drybrook halt (up side), preceding which bridges carried the line over the Trafalgar tramway and a lane. Yet a further 1/4 mile fragment of the line was opened as late as 18 October 1928, from Drybrook halt to Drybrook quarries. Two over-bridges and a short tunnel were traversed on this section, and as the gradient fell towards Bilson at 1 in 46, catch-points were provided north of the halt to protect the auto-train from runaways. At the quarries, two sidings were provided on the down side, looped to the running line.

== Topography ==
- Mitcheldean Road; on Hereford, Ross and Gloucester Railway;
- Euroclydon Tunnel;
- Admiralty siding;
- Drybrook Quarry;
- Drybrook Tunnel; Maggs refers to this as Hawthorne Tunnel;
- Drybrook Halt;
- Harrow Hill Siding;
- Speedwell Siding;
- Nailbridge Halt;
- Steam Mills Crossing;
- Whimsey goods; later named Cinderford goods;
- (end of Mitcheldean Road and Forest of Dean Railway section);
- Whimsey Halt;
- Whimsey Junction (with former Forest of Dean Railway, towards Newnham).

The section from Whimsey goods to Whimsey Junction was originally part of the Bullo Pill Railway, later the forest of Dean Railway.

Cooke describes the section as the Cinderford Branch.

== See also ==
- Lea Bailey Light Railway
