= Wicked Little Letters =

2023 film by Thea Sharrock

- Theatrical release poster
- Directed by: Thea Sharrock
- Written by: Jonny Sweet
- Produced by: Graham Broadbent; Pete Czernin; Ed Sinclair; Olivia Colman; Jo Wallett
- Starring: Olivia Colman; Jessie Buckley; Anjana Vasan; Joanna Scanlan; Gemma Jones; Malachi Kirby; Lolly Adefope; Eileen Atkins; Timothy Spall
- Cinematography: Ben Davis
- Edited by: Melanie Oliver
- Music by: Isobel Waller-Bridge
- Production companies: Film4; Blueprint Pictures; South of the River Pictures; People Person Pictures
- Distributed by: StudioCanal
- Release dates: 9 September 2023 (TIFF); 23 February 2024 (United Kingdom)
- Running time: 100 minutes
- Country: United Kingdom
- Language: English
- Budget: $12.6 million
- Box office: $27.2 million

Wicked Little Letters is a 2023 British period black comedy mystery film directed by Thea Sharrock, written by Jonny Sweet and starring Olivia Colman, Jessie Buckley, Anjana Vasan, Joanna Scanlan, Gemma Jones, Malachi Kirby, Lolly Adefope, Eileen Atkins and Timothy Spall. Based on the Littlehampton libels of the early 1920s, it follows an investigation into the anonymous author of numerous crudely insulting letters sent to the residents of the seaside town of Littlehampton.

Wicked Little Letters premiered at the Toronto International Film Festival on 9 September 2023, and was released in the United Kingdom by StudioCanal on 23 February 2024. It received generally positive reviews from critics, and grossed $27.2 million on a $12.6 million budget.

== Plot ==
In 1920, Edith Swan, a devout Christian in Littlehampton, becomes the target of hate mail, an issue of great distress to her controlling father Edward and gentle mother Victoria. Having endured 19 such letters filled with profanities, Edward seeks the assistance of the local police. They suspect their neighbour, the single mother and Irish migrant Rose Gooding, as the sender.

Highlighting Rose's infamous proclivity for swearing, Edith testifies that she and Rose initially shared a friendship despite their differences. This friendship abruptly ended following an episode in which Rose head-butted one of Edward's guests at his birthday party. This was followed by a visit from the local child protection services acting on a tip; believing Edith had called them, Rose ended the friendship.

Rose is arrested. Since she cannot afford bail, Rose is remanded ahead of her trial, set to take place in two-and-a-half months. She leaves her daughter Nancy in the care of Bill, her partner. A police officer, Gladys Moss, is sceptical about Rose's involvement, noticing differences between Rose's handwriting and that of the letters. Her observations are dismissed by her misogynistic superior, Chief Constable Spedding, who forbids her from investigating.

Gladys meets Edith's friends Ann, Mabel and Kate for insight. Kate detests her, but Ann and Mabel are more sympathetic. Rose initially attempts to seek Gladys' help but is rebuffed; Ann and Mabel bail her out anyway. Immediately upon Rose's release, Edward and other Littlehampton residents begin receiving similar letters and blame Rose. The case swiftly becomes a national sensation, catching the attention of Westminster and the press. Gladys finally agrees to help Rose, noting the discrimination they have faced.

Edith is revealed to be the sender, having orchestrated the plot to channel her repressed anger towards Edward's maltreatment of her. She writes another letter to herself, only for it to be intercepted by an unknowing Victoria, who collapses and dies upon reading it. While concluding the police formalities, Gladys notices similarities between Edith's signature and the letters; again, her claims are dismissed by Spedding, who suspends her from duty for violating his order not to investigate the case. Undeterred, Gladys enlists Ann, Mabel and Kate to investigate privately, albeit without Rose's involvement. Edith evades Gladys and outsmarts her while posting another letter. On the eve of her trial, Rose finally discovers the ruse when she notices that the distinctive form of the letter G on a commercial sign that Edith had painted earlier is identical to that in the letters.

During the trial, Rose admits her infamy for her profuse vulgarities, but claims that she would have communicated them verbally rather than write the anonymous letters. Her defence counsel also points to Edith's handwriting but is dismissed. The prosecution corners Rose by revealing Nancy's true origins as an illegitimate child and not the daughter of a killed Great War soldier, as Rose had previously claimed. The revelation upsets both Nancy and Bill.

Later, Edith confronts Edward over his control, and that he was the one who tipped off child services on Rose; he shuts her up. The next day, Gladys and the trio suspect Edith will write a final letter, and thus they prepare stamps marked with specially prepared invisible ink for Edith to use, which she does. Rose flees when Spedding attempts to arrest her prematurely. She corners Edith over her trickery, culminating in their exchanging foul language, and eventually goads her into posting the letter. Gladys has her niece intercept it inside the mailbox and then demonstrates Edith's culpability by revealing the special ink, resulting in Edith's arrest and Rose's exoneration.

Following the trial, the two women share a civil moment; Edith regrets the end of the friendship, explaining she meant no harm. She manages a final, defiant moment against Edward by cursing at him publicly, much to his shock and Rose's glee. Edith is sentenced to twelve months hard labour, Rose is never accused again, and Gladys is commended for her actions.

== Cast ==
- Olivia Colman as Edith Swan
- Jessie Buckley as Rose Gooding
- Anjana Vasan as WPC Gladys Moss
- Joanna Scanlan as Ann
- Gemma Jones as Victoria Swan
- Malachi Kirby as Bill
- Lolly Adefope as Kate
- Eileen Atkins as Mabel
- Timothy Spall as Edward Swan
- Hugh Skinner as Constable Papperwick
- Paul Chahidi as Chief Constable Spedding
- Jason Watkins as Mr. Treading
- Alisha Weir as Nancy Gooding
- Jonny Sweet as Daily Mail reporter
- Tim Key as Father Ambrose
- Krishni Patel as Winnie Moss
- Richard Goulding as Mr. Scales
- Cyril Nri as Judge Maccleston

== Production ==
The story and social context behind the plot had been explored in two books by historian Emily Cockayne, Cheek by Jowl: A History of Neighbours and Penning Poison: A History of Anonymous Letters. The film was announced in May 2022, with Thea Sharrock set to direct, with Olivia Colman and Jessie Buckley starring. In September, the cast was rounded out with Anjana Vasan, Timothy Spall, Gemma Jones and Eileen Atkins among the additions. Production began in September 2022 and continued till early October in Arundel and Worthing, with some scenes filmed in and around the former Crown Court in Aylesbury. Shepton Mallet prison was the location for the prison scenes. Ben Davis served as cinematographer. Principal photography took place on Stage 1 of Pinewood Studios.

== Release ==
Wicked Little Letters premiered at the Toronto International Film Festival on 9 September 2023. In November 2023, Sony Pictures Classics acquired North American and Chinese distribution rights, after its sister company Stage 6 Films acquired international rights in various countries including Latin America, Scandinavia, Asia (excluding China), Eastern Europe, the CIS and the Baltics. The film was released in cinemas in the United Kingdom on 23 February 2024 by StudioCanal. It was added to Netflix in the United Kingdom and the United States through first-window deals with respective distributors on 26 and 27 July.

== Reception ==
On the review aggregator website Rotten Tomatoes, 80% of 178 critics' reviews are positive, with an average rating of 6.8/10. The website's consensus reads: "Thanks largely to a strong cast that leans into the story's humorous side, Wicked Little Letters is a diverting comedy even if the mystery at its core isn't particularly clever." Metacritic, which uses a weighted average, assigned the film a score of 58 out of 100, based on 38 critics, indicating "mixed or average" reviews.

Richard Roeper of the Chicago Sun-Times gave the film three stars out of four and wrote, "The chief delight in Wicked Little Letters is watching Colman and Buckley in action; it's really not much of a mystery, as the culprit is revealed to us long before the townsfolk catch on."

== See also ==
- Le Corbeau (1943 film)
