= Littlehampton libels =

1920s miscarriage of justice in England

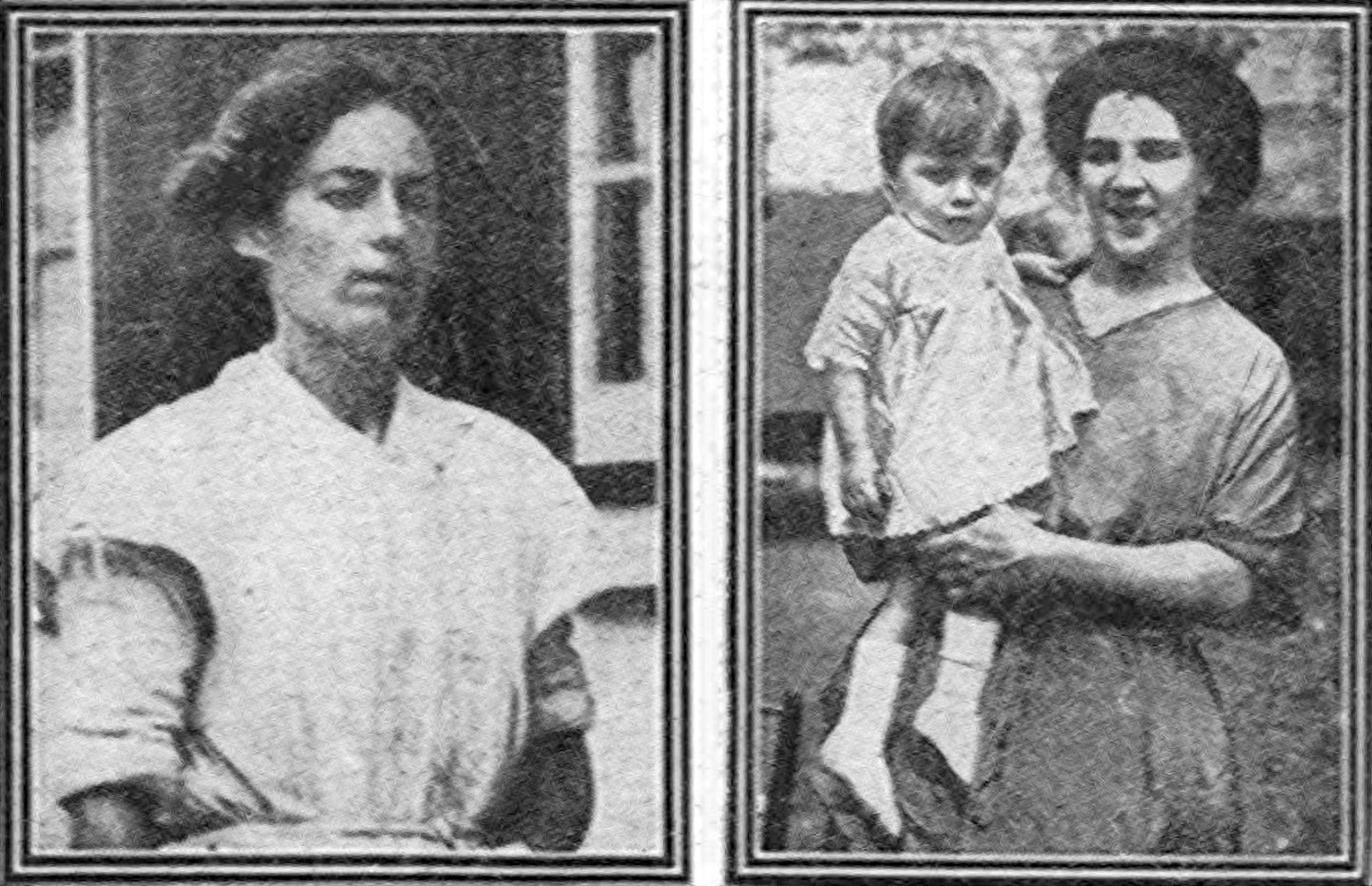
Edith Swan (left) and Rose Gooding (right)

The Littlehampton libels were a series of letters sent to numerous residents of Littlehampton, in southern England, over a three-year period between 1920 and 1923. The letters, which contained obscenities and false accusations, were written by Edith Swan, a thirty-year-old laundress; she tried to incriminate her neighbour, Rose Gooding, a thirty-year-old married woman.

Swan and Gooding had once been friends, but after Swan made a false report to the National Society for the Prevention of Cruelty to Children accusing Gooding of maltreating one of her sister's children, the letters started arriving. Many of them were signed as if from Gooding. Swan brought a private prosecution against Gooding for libel; in December 1920 Gooding was found guilty and imprisoned for two weeks. On her release the letters started again, and Swan brought a second private prosecution against Gooding. In February 1921 Gooding was again found guilty and imprisoned for twelve months.

While Gooding was in prison, two notebooks were found in Littlehampton. They contained further obscenities and falsehoods and were in the same handwriting as the letters. As a result, Gooding's case came to the attention of the Director of Public Prosecutions, Sir Archibald Bodkin, who thought that there had been a miscarriage of justice. An investigation by the Metropolitan Police cleared Gooding of involvement in sending the letters and she was released from prison. When the letters started up again, the focus of police attention moved to Swan and she was put under surveillance. She was seen to drop a libellous letter and prosecuted in December 1921. Despite the evidence against her, the judge intervened in the prosecution's questioning and the case collapsed.

In early 1922 the letters began arriving again. By October the police and detectives from the General Post Office (GPO) were involved, all targeting Swan. GPO detectives caught Swan sending another libellous letter in June 1923. She was arrested, found guilty and imprisoned for a year. In 2023 a film about the events, Wicked Little Letters, was released; it stars Olivia Colman as Swan and Jessie Buckley as Gooding. A similar case of libellous letters being sent over several years was reported in 2024, in the village of Shiptonthorpe, East Yorkshire; parallels were observed with the events at Littlehampton.

== Background ==
Littlehampton and Lewes, southern England

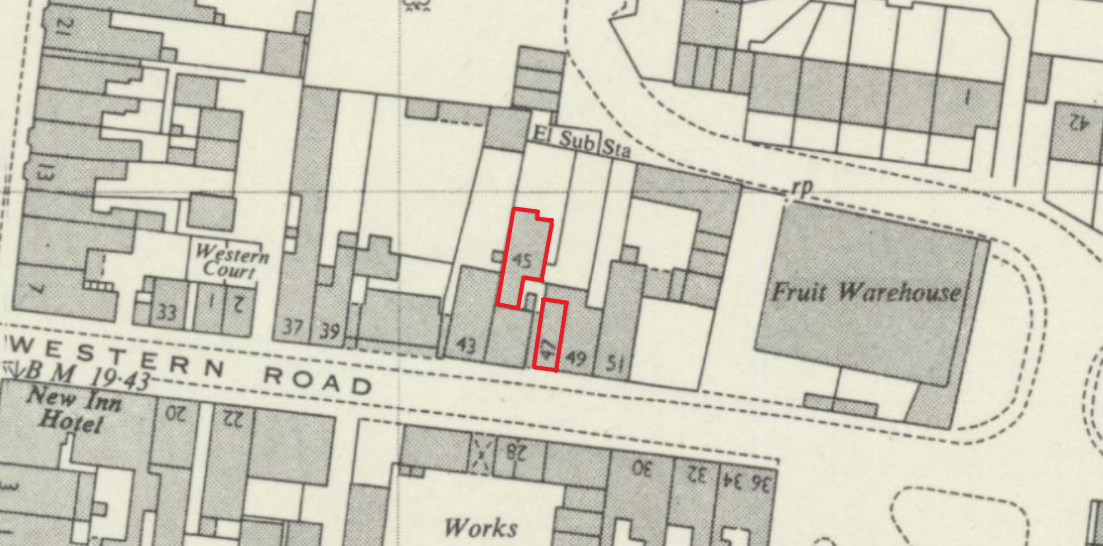
Western Road, showing the positions of numbers 45 and 47

Littlehampton, Sussex (now West Sussex), was a town of 11,000 people in the 1920s. It is on England's south coast at the mouth of the River Arun; the town includes a small port which received shipping from northern Europe and served as the home port for a fishing fleet. The town was also a thriving seaside resort. Rose and Bill Gooding lived in a rented cottage at 45 Western Road, Littlehampton. Bill was from Kent and had met Rose when he worked on barges on Sussex's River Ouse between Newhaven harbour and Lewes. She had a child, Dorothy, from a previous relationship. The couple married in Lewes in 1913 when Rose was twenty-two and he was thirty-four; they moved to Littlehampton in 1916. (Note: Bill worked with his father-in-law, William Russell, on the steam ship Nigel during the First World War. In 1915, while transporting military stores across the channel, it hit a mine near Boulogne-sur-Mer and sank. Bill survived, but Russell, working in the engine room, died.) By 1920 the couple had a son, William. They lived in Western Road with Rose's sister Ruth Russell and her children, Gertrude, William and Albert. Although Ruth's children had been born out of wedlock and she never married, she called herself "Mrs Russell", and she and Rose told people that her husband had died in the war. The historian Christopher Hilliard observes that at the time, unmarried mothers often referred to themselves as widows.

Rose and Bill were known to argue, and several people who knew her in Littlehampton described her as being hot-tempered. She was also known to swear frequently and was thought to be an odd character by several neighbours; she was described by a Littlehampton police constable as "rather an eccentric woman". Bill was described by one landlady as "a sober, hardworking man, who was, on one occasion only seen the worse for drink". Bill accused Rose of having an affair with another man while he was away at sea. She stayed at a neighbour's house for several days, after Bill had hit her and thrown her out of the family home; she showed the neighbour the bruises he inflicted. The couple argued and there was, according to Hilliard, "a persistent hum of conflict" between the two.

The Swan family were natives of Littlehampton and had lived at 47 Western Road for several years. Edith Swan was one of the thirteen children of Edward and Mary Ann Swan; (Note: Of the thirteen, four died in infancy.) the two parents and three of their offspring—Edith and two of her brothers—lived in the family home. The two brothers, aged 39 and 40, shared one of the bedrooms; Edith, aged 30, shared a room with her parents, both of whom were in their seventies. In 1921 Swan worked as a laundress; she had previously been a domestic servant, although she was dismissed after being accused of stealing some children's clothes. The matter was not referred to the police. According to the legal historian James Morton, Edith was highly regarded in the neighbourhood. She was engaged to Bert Boxall, a man from nearby Horsham; he had been a bricklayer before joining the army, and in 1921 he was serving in Mesopotamia.

Relations between Swan and Gooding were cordial when the Goodings first moved in. The historian Emily Cockayne describes Swan as ingratiating towards Gooding at first; Swan wrote out a recipe for marrow chutney and a knitting pattern for socks for her neighbour. She and Gooding would visit each other's houses and they lent household items between each other, including a bath, clothes and cooking equipment. The good relations between the neighbours lasted until 4 April 1920—Easter Sunday.

== Events ==
=== Start of the letters, May to July 1920 ===
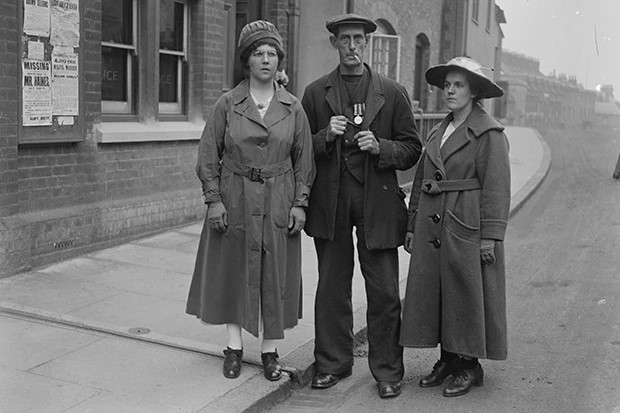
(left to right) Rose Gooding, her husband and sister, Ruth Russell, 1921

In May 1920 Swan wrote to the National Society for the Prevention of Cruelty to Children (NSPCC), falsely accusing Gooding of maltreating one of Russell's children on Easter Sunday. (Note: The NSPCC is a British child protection charity founded in 1884.) Swan later recalled the incident to Littlehampton police, who recorded:

[Bill Gooding] took the baby away from her because she had been beating her sister's baby with the cane. He said he would not allow her to hit it with the cane. She accused Mr. Gooding of being the father of her sister's last baby.

An NSPCC inspector thought Swan's report was suspicious because of the level of detail it contained, but visited Littlehampton and interviewed the Goodings, Swan and other neighbours. None of the other neighbours corroborated Swan's claims. Rejecting the accusation, the investigator reported that he "found the home to be spotlessly clean and the children in a perfect state in every way".

Shortly after the visit, letters began arriving at the Swans' and people they knew and dealt with. These included Swan's laundry clients, the butcher, fishmonger, general store manager and dairy. The letters stated that Swan was a prostitute and said her family were drunkards. Many of the letters were signed "R—", "R. G.", "with Mrs. Gooding's compliments" and "Mrs R. E. Gooding". A letter was also sent to Boxall in Mesopotamia, stating that Constable Russell—who lived at 49 Western Road—had "gone away with Miss Swan who was expecting a baby by him". Boxall replied to Swan, breaking off the engagement. Sources differ about the eventual outcome of the relationship, with Hilliard stating that they were engaged once again after a few months, while Cockayne says that the relationship came to an end.

The letters were delivered in a variety of ways; some went through the post in the normal way, others were hand-delivered and some were posted without stamps, meaning the recipients had to pay for the delivery of the messages, which was the cost of the letter plus a fine from the Royal Mail. Some of the post was in the form of a letter, while others were written on postcards, meaning the message could be read by several people before it reached the recipient. A postcard was sent to the manager of the Beach Hotel, where Swan's brother Ernest worked. The message accused Ernest of theft from the hotel. Hilliard notes that this would have been seen by several other employees at the hotel before it reached the manager. The manager did not believe the note. (Note: Hilliard notes that none of the original letters are available in The National Archives except for a selection from September and October 1921. The remainder, Hilliard suggests, are likely to have either been removed, or been lost when they were used as exhibits at the various court cases.)

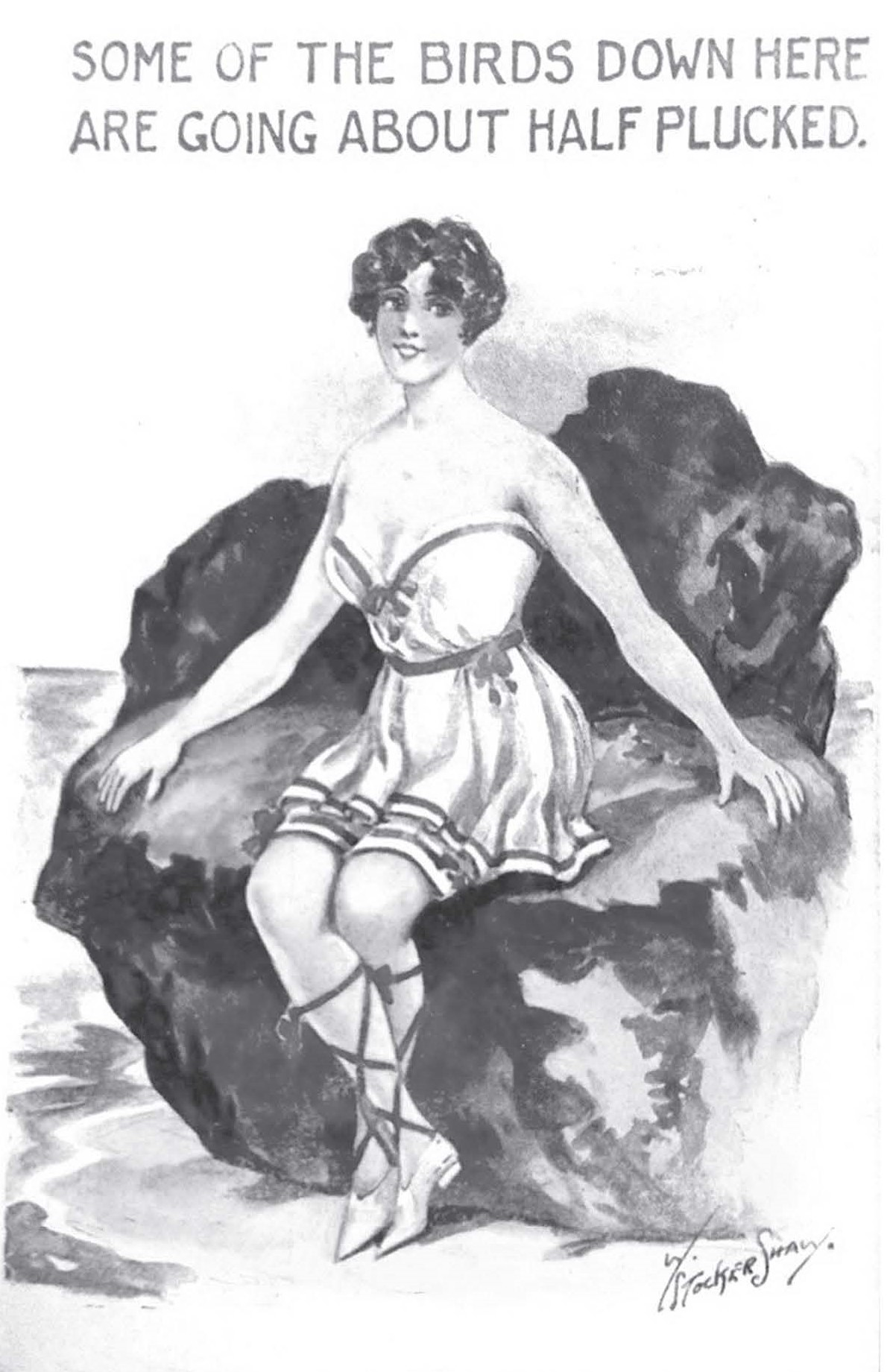
Postcard by William Stocker Shaw, sent to Bill Gooding in August 1920

The letters continued to be received, including by Gooding's husband, who received two messages at his place of work. One said that Gooding was seeing other men at a previous employer's house, the second read "Ask your wife who she was with on Tuesday afternoon on the Common"; it was signed "V. G." A seaside postcard showing a woman in a bathing suit, and addressed to Bill was sent to the family home; it read "From your darling Sweetheart Philis". The Goodings took the libels—and the impact they had on Rose's reputation—seriously, and Bill went to many of those who received letters and asserted her innocence.

=== First court case, July to December 1920 ===
On 5 July 1920 Swan and her mother went to the justices of the peace, who advised her to seek advice from a solicitor. She visited Arthur Shelley, a local solicitor, the same day. Shelley wrote to Gooding to inform her of his involvement, then began his investigation. The letters continued, and Shelley also began receiving them. Gooding was summoned to a police court hearing, which took place in September 1920. Swan had brought a witness who swore he had seen Dorothy Gooding post a letter addressed to Swan. Swan claimed that she had seen Gooding drop one letter, which Swan then picked up and handed to her solicitor. Gooding was committed for trial and offered bail of £50, (Note: £50 in 1920 equates to approximately £2,000 in 2025, according to calculations based on the Consumer Price Index measure of inflation.) but the Goodings could not raise this, so she was sent to Portsmouth gaol for twelve weeks before her trial.

Gooding's case was heard at the Lewes assizes in December 1920, with Alexander Roche as judge. The prosecution provided no handwriting analysis to connect the letters to Gooding, something Roche criticised them for. Despite Gooding's persistent statements of innocence, the jury found her guilty and she was sentenced to fourteen days' imprisonment in Portsmouth. She was bound over to keep the peace for two years for which she had to pay £20 surety. (Note: £20 in 1920 equates to approximately £1,000 in 2025, according to calculations based on the Consumer Price Index measure of inflation.)

=== More letters and a second court action, January to April 1921 ===
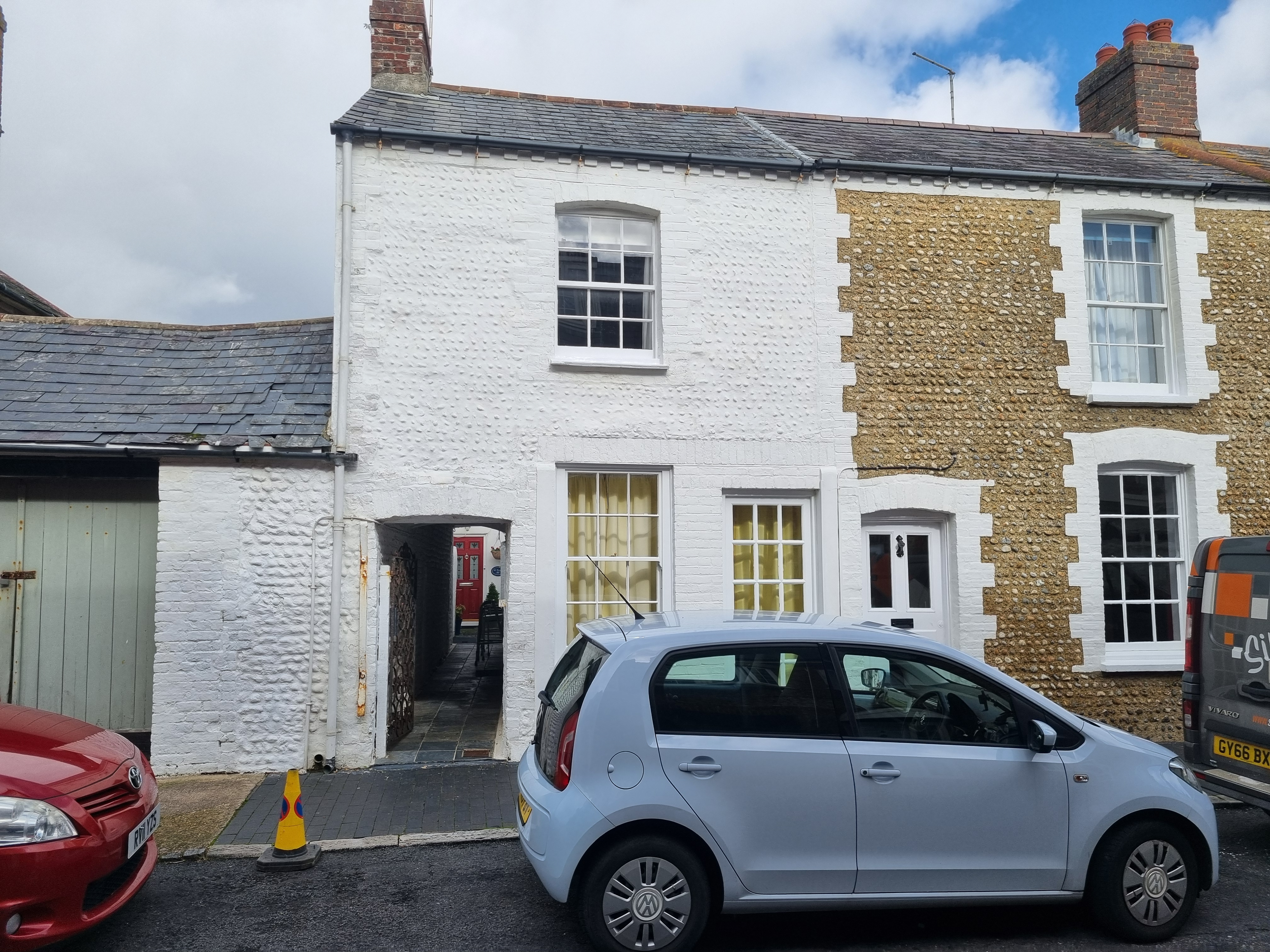
45 Western Road in 2024

No libellous letters were received while Gooding was in prison, but two weeks after she was released, they began again. In early January 1921 Swan went to the police and complained that the letters had restarted. The police phoned Edward Wannop, Gooding's solicitor, who met Bill Gooding and informed him of the new letters; the two men agreed to send Rose to stay with her mother in Lewes. Neither of the Goodings had realised that the letters had begun again, and Rose left Littlehampton that day. For two weeks Bill, the children and Russell conducted a charade of pretending Rose was in the house to try and trick the Swans into thinking she was still in Littlehampton. The family would call out to Rose, the children said goodbye to her as they left for school, and any delivery men were told that she was upstairs with a headache. To build up proof that she was in Lewes, Rose was instructed to write home regularly so that they had a collection of letters with Lewes postmarks to prove where she was.

On 12 February 1921 Swan claimed to have received two letters, one addressed to "Bloody buggering old Russell", the other to "Bloody old whore Miss Swan". She gave the first to Constable Russell and took the second to her solicitor. Three days later Gooding was arrested and committed to the March assizes in Lewes; bail was not granted. The judge for the case was Horace Avory. When the jury retired to consider a verdict, they returned after eight minutes to request a sample of Gooding's handwriting; Avory said they would not be able to obtain one at this stage of the case. After further consideration the jury provided a verdict of guilty on what Cockayne describes as "weak circumstantial evidence". Gooding was sentenced to twelve months in prison with hard labour. The Director of Public Prosecutions, Sir Archibald Bodkin later said he thought Avory's decision to refuse the request about handwriting was "astonishing", given it was in "a case which, from its commencement to the end of it, was a case of handwriting".

In April Gooding tried to appeal the verdict, but the application was dismissed as there were no new grounds. Bill Gooding wrote several times to the Home Secretary requesting that the case be reopened and Rose protested to the prison governor that she was innocent. Their attempts made no headway in either obtaining her release or a further trial.

=== Metropolitan Police involvement, April to July 1921 ===
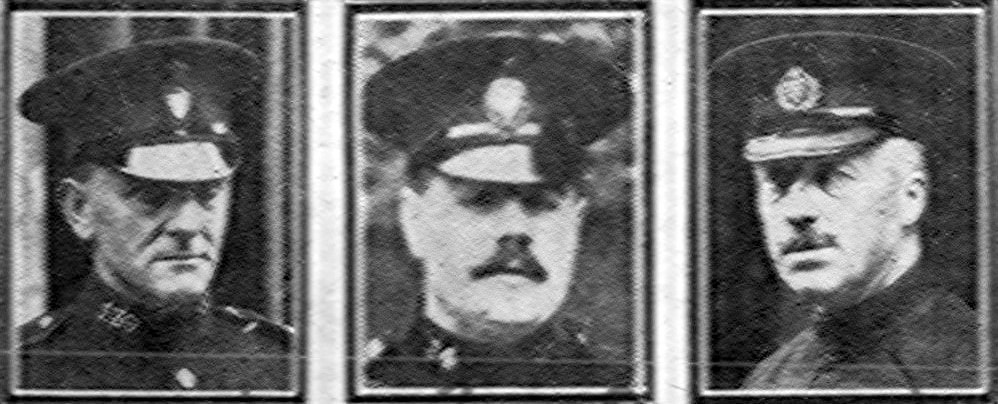
(left to right) PCs Hutchinson and May and Inspector Thomas, of Littlehampton police

In April 1921 a notebook containing obscene wording was found on Selbourne Road, which ran parallel to Western Road. It was posted anonymously to Inspector Thomas of Littlehampton police. The handwriting was the same as that of the notes. That same week a red exercise book was found in Littlehampton; it included the name of Gooding's eleven-year-old daughter in several places, and contained what Bodkin described as "filthy expressions concerning Miss Swan and in the same handwriting as the torn book of the libels". Thomas sent both books to Bodkin, who concluded that, with Gooding in prison, it was unlikely that she was responsible for the two notebooks. He considered the possibility that Gooding "has so arranged, when imprisoned on the latter occasion, that the torn book, and the red book, should be discovered so as to give rise to the observation that somebody else was responsible and not she herself". To ensure this was not the case, the governor of Portsmouth prison was asked if Gooding could have smuggled the books out of prison; the answer was no, and the governor added a note that he did not think her guilty.

Bodkin passed the file on Gooding's case to the Home Office lawyer Sir Ernley Blackwell, who noted "I have very little doubt that this woman has twice been wrongly convicted". Correspondence between Superintendent Peel of West Sussex police and A. S. Williams, the chief constable of West Sussex, showed that Sussex police still considered Gooding the guilty party; in particular, they would not entertain any suggestion that Swan could be guilty. In June 1921 Peel reported to Williams that:

I have made enquiries respecting the character of Miss Swan and find that she bears a very good character, She is a very hard working woman, and what I have seen of her I do not think that she would write such things about herself and send them through the post on post cards for every one to see, Mrs Gooding and her sister ... have both had illegitimate children.

Bodkin, needing an impartial investigator for the matter, requested assistance from the Criminal Investigation Department of the Metropolitan Police, who provided Inspector George Nicholls. (Note: Nicholls was the man who arrested Charles Wells (the man who broke the bank at Monte Carlo), and monitored German spies during the First World War.) Nicholls interviewed twenty-nine people connected to the case, and spoke to many others. He travelled to Worthing—where former constable Russell had moved after retiring. He also went to Lewes, to ascertain if Gooding had been staying there in January 1921; he came away satisfied that she had been there for two weeks without leaving. Nicholls later described Swan as "not only a peculiar woman in appearance and behaviour, but would seem to have a remarkable memory—especially for filthy phrases—for she has apparently got these letters by heart and is enabled to reel them off without any hesitation".

When he had finished his investigation, Nicholls had three main suspects: Swan, her father and Ruth Russell. He obtained handwriting samples from all of them and obtained their National Registration forms that British civilians had to complete during the First World War. Nicholls also searched the Swans' and Goodings' houses and found, at the Swans' house, several sheets of blotting-paper. One of these contained the word "Local" in the same handwriting as the libels; when Nicholls asked Swan about it, she said that Gooding and Russell had both borrowed blotting-paper from her. Bill Gooding and Russell both denied ever having borrowed it from her. Nicholls compared the paper with some of the examples of the libels, and found a matching part of an address on a letter dated 1 January 1921; this was six months after Swan had loaned any paper to Gooding. Nicholls reported back to Bodkin that neither Gooding's handwriting or spelling was similar to that in the libels; he stopped short of suggesting Swan should be charged.

In July 1921 an appeal was heard before the Court of Criminal Appeal; Travers Humphreys was the barrister appearing on behalf of Gooding. He told the court that he was appearing having been personally instructed by the Attorney General and that the appeal had the approval of the Home Secretary; the court quashed both of Gooding's convictions without hearing any of the evidence. Gooding was granted £250 in compensation. (Note: £250 in 1921 equates to approximately £11,000 in 2025, according to calculations based on the Consumer Price Index measure of inflation.)

=== More letters and the focus on Swan, July to December 1921 ===
Attendees at court, October 1921

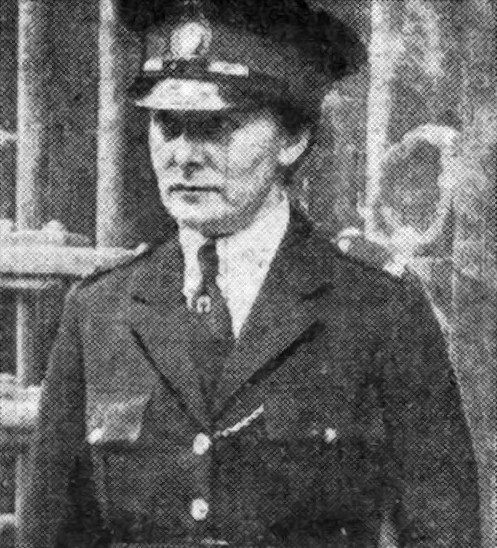
Policewoman Gladys Moss

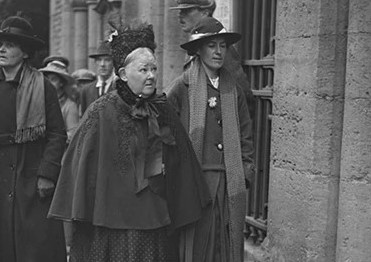
Edith Swan (right) and her mother

After Constable Russell had retired and moved to Worthing, his police cottage was let to Violet and Constable George May; Violet and Edith became friends. In September the Mays soon began receiving libellous notes. One was addressed "To fucking old whore May, 49, Western Rd, Local" and the message read "You and your fucking whore neybor [sic] can throw as many jeers as you like but God will punish you you foxy ass piss country whores." Another read "You bloody fucking flaming piss country whores go and fuck your cunt. Its your drain that stinks not our fish box. Yo fucking dirty sods. You are as bad as your whore neybor." (Note: The notes to the Mays, held by the National Archives, are the only known surviving examples of the letters.) Swan told Violet that Gooding was responsible, but Violet doubted that this was the case; she passed the notes to her husband. Littlehampton police assigned Policewoman Gladys Moss to investigate the matter.

On 27 September Moss was undertaking surveillance from a shed when she saw Swan drop a letter into the courtyard shared by the Swans, Mays and Goodings; Violet was also a witness to Swan dropping the letter. Violet retrieved the note, which was written as if by Gooding; it contained obscenities and accusations against Swan and one of her brothers. Moss confronted Swan about the letter, who denied it was hers. Moss went to the police station; ten minutes later Swan arrived and changed her story, saying she picked it up, saw the writing and threw it down again. While waiting for the inspector to return, Moss recalled that Swan "was moving her mouth as if she were talking to herself the whole of the time". When the inspector arrived, Swan changed her story again, saying she saw the paper, but did not know it had any writing on it. The police took no action at the time.

Over the next few weeks, during the night, the Mays found their bins were being disturbed and their garden allotment was vandalised. Moss continued her surveillance, but no new events were noted over the next two weeks. On 8 October Moss, Thomas and Williams travelled to London for a meeting with Nicholls and Bodkin. Nicholls then travelled to Littlehampton and interviewed several individuals connected to the case, including the Mays and Moss. Nicholls' report to Bodkin led to Swan being charged on 21 October with obscene libel for "unlawfully writing and publishing a certain false, scandalous and defamatory libel of and concerning one Violet May".

Swan's committal hearing was heard on 27 October at Arundel Town Hall; she was committed to trial at the Lewes assizes on 8 December 1921 with Sir Clement Bailhache as the judge; Humphreys was the prosecuting barrister. Part of Swan's defence was that Moss only had a limited view of the area from her hiding place, and it was possible that a third party could have thrown the paper into the courtyard. During the defence questioning, it was stated that Swan had never been known to swear; the judge interrupted Humphreys' questioning to ask if he intended to continue, saying "If I were on the jury, I should refuse to convict." Given such a steer from the judge, Humphreys did not continue and the case collapsed. Hilliard observes that despite all the evidence against her, Bailhache must have been convinced to exonerate Swan because she appeared to be incapable of committing such a crime.

=== Swan's second court case, January 1922 to December 1923 ===
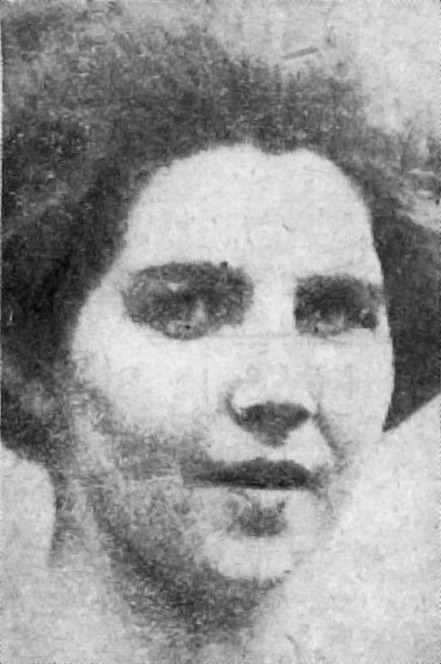
Gooding in July 1923

Although there was a hiatus in the libellous letters being sent in Littlehampton, they recommenced in early 1922. By October 1922 a large number of such letters had been received; recipients included many of those who had been included in the court cases, including a magistrate, court officials, members of the police and those who provided bail for both Swan and Gooding. The notes were also addressed to other residents of Littlehampton. One recipient, Caroline Johnson, was accused of being a prostitute. Johnson assaulted Gooding, pulling her hair and hitting her in the face, knocking her unconscious to the floor. On 17 October she was fined £1 for the assault, an amount Hilliard describes as modest, although it was double the amount another woman was fined for a similar offence that day. (Note: £1 in 1921 equates to approximately £42 in 2025, according to calculations based on the Consumer Price Index measure of inflation.) Frederick Peel, the former superintendent, but by then the deputy chief constable of West Sussex, was present at the case and Bill Gooding overheard him saying that he still believed Rose was responsible for the letters.

By mid-1923 the police and the General Post Office (GPO) had decided to act. (Note: The GPO employed fifty detectives at the time. Much of their work was focused on internal crime (such as theft by staff), but they also investigated any offence that came under the Post Office Act 1908.) The GPO detectives developed a strategy that targeted Swan. They marked stamps with invisible ink, which they supplied to the local sub-post office; the owners were instructed to only sell these to Swan, which they did on 23 June. A post box thought to be used by Swan was kept under surveillance and the Post Office staff were instructed to look out for any mail Swan posted in the inside box. The GPO detectives had what Hilliard describes as "a periscope mirror" that allowed a user to view inside postboxes to look at any letters that had been posted; they could also watch the entrance to the Post Office while remaining out of sight. On 24 June Swan was seen posting two letters in the inside postbox. The postmaster caught the letters as they were posted and handed them to the detective. While one was to Swan's sister, the other was addressed to the local sanitary inspector; it was shown to contain obscene words. A second GPO detective went to Swan's house and brought her back to the post office. Swan was cautioned and the contents of the letter and marked stamp were shown to her; she replied "I have no explanation to offer other than that I am not guilty either of writing or posting any letters to the Sanitary Inspector". On 4 July 1923 Peel and Thomas went to Swan's house and charged her under Section 63 of the Post Office Act 1908 with "attempting to send a postal packet which had thereon words of an indecent, obscene, and grossly offensive character".

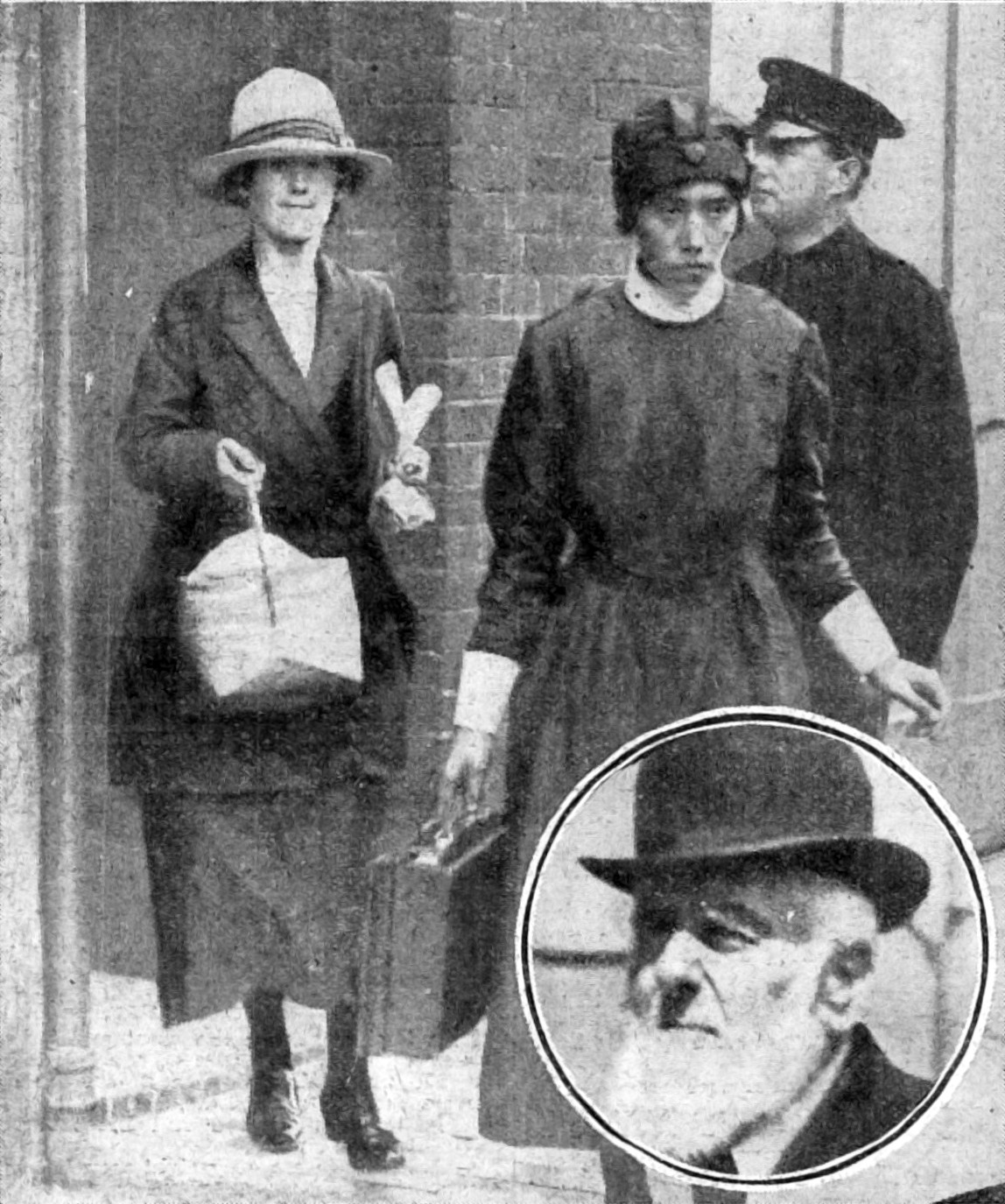
Swan (left) leaving court in July 1923; Swan's father shown inset

Swan's committal hearing was held at Arundel Town Hall on 11 July 1923. Swan chose to reserve her defence; she was committed to trial. Bail was fixed at £25 and two sureties of £25. As these were not paid, Swan was held in custody until the trial. (Note: £25 in 1923 equates to approximately £1,000 in 2025, according to calculations based on the Consumer Price Index measure of inflation.) Swan's case opened at Lewes assizes on 18 July. Humphreys appeared for the prosecution again and Avory was again the judge. Swan swore her innocence throughout the trial, despite the evidence against her. Avory's thirty-minute summary was in Swan's favour, and he noted that she was a clean and upright woman, but the jury found her guilty. She was sentenced to twelve months in prison. In his 1946 memoirs, Humphreys considered Swan to be

... the perfect witness. Neat and tidy in appearance, polite and respectful in her answer, with just that twinge of feeling to be expected in a person who knows herself to be a victim of circumstances ... She completely took in three juries and two judges.

Swan soon appealed, and this was held on 13 August 1923 at the Court of Criminal Appeal in London. The matter was considered by Lord Hewart, the Lord Chief Justice; Sir Arthur Salter and Sir Rigby Swift. They declined the appeal. In December 1923 she petitioned the Home Office both for a reduction in sentence and for her release on the grounds she was innocent. Four days later the Home Office responded saying there would be no action taken and Swan served her full sentence.

Hilliard observes that the small matter of insulting letters being sent in Littlehampton resulted in four trials and two appeals, and involved the Director of Public Prosecutions and the Lord Chief Justice. This, Hilliard suggests, was because of the assumptions made on the basis of the social values held by many of the officials involved. These values saved Swan from a conviction, despite eyewitness testimony from Moss. Hilliard considers that "Edith Swan personified the respectable, respectful victim of circumstances; Rose Gooding's 'roughness', illegitimate child and heterodox family licensed people to think her capable of writing the offensive letters".

== Aftermath and legacy ==
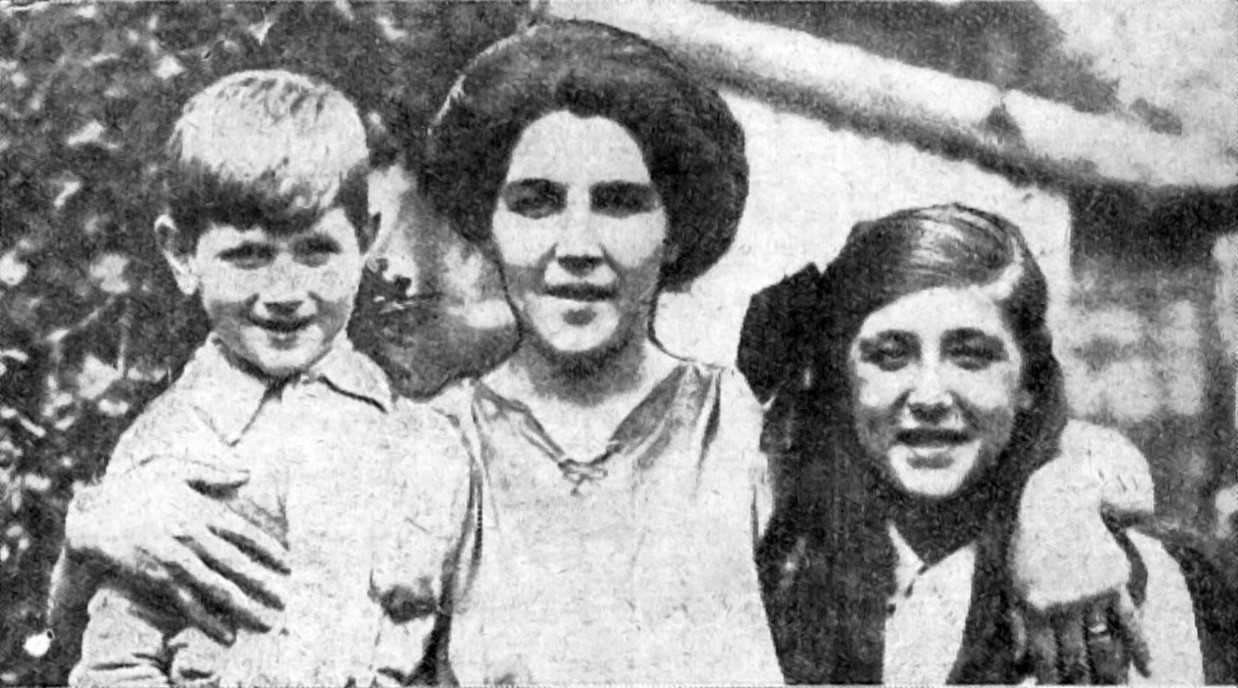
Gooding and her children, 1923

According to Cockayne, Gooding was a changed person after her ordeal. She suffered from insomnia and was "unable to pick up the thread of her life". Even after Swan's conviction Gooding continued to encounter hostility and was marginalised by the community. The Goodings moved house away from Western Road and into the centre of Littlehampton; Bill died there in 1947, aged sixty-eight. Gooding lived until December 1968, when she died at her daughter's home in East Dean, a village near Eastbourne, East Sussex. Swan died in a council-run residential home—a former workhouse—in March 1959, at the age of sixty-eight.

In August 1975 many of the houses on Western Road—including 47 and 49—were designated Grade II listed buildings, providing the properties with protection from unauthorised demolition or unsympathetic modification. No. 45 was not included in the listing, but is listed locally.

The film Wicked Little Letters was released in 2023. Based on the events of Littlehampton, the film stars Olivia Colman as Swan and Jessie Buckley as Gooding. In 2024 it was reported that a similar case of anonymously sent offensive or obscene letters was experienced by some residents of Shiptonthorpe, East Yorkshire; parallels were drawn with the events in Littlehampton. In Shiptonthorpe, the letters were sent over a period of two years.

== Notes and references ==
=== Sources ===
==== Books ====
- Cockayne, Emily (2023). Penning Poison: A History of Anonymous Letters. Oxford University Press. ISBN 978-0-1987-9505-6.
- Evans, Mary; Moore, Sarah; Johnstone, Hazel (2019). Detecting the Social: Order and Disorder in Post-1970s Detective Fiction. Cham, Zug: Palgrave Macmillan. doi:10.1007/978-3-319-94520-0. ISBN 978-3-3199-4520-0.
- Hilliard, Christopher (2017). The Littlehampton Libels: A Miscarriage of Justice and a Mystery about Words in 1920s England. Oxford University Press. ISBN 978-0-1987-9965-8.
- Humphreys, Travers (1946). Criminal Days. Recollections and Reflections. London: Hodder & Stoughton. OCLC 2617004.
- Jackson, Robert (1962). Case for the Prosecution: A Biography of Sir Archibald Bodkin, Director of Public Prosecutions, 1920–1930. London: Arthur Baker. OCLC 6841285.
- Morton, James (2015). Justice Denied: Extraordinary Miscarriages of Justice. London: Robinson. ISBN 978-1-4721-1131-9.

==== News ====
- "Anonymous Letter Mystery". The Littlehampton Gazette. 20 July 1923. p. 3.
- "Anonymous Letters Case Recalled". The Times. 10 October 1922. p. 9.
- "Court of Criminal Appeal". The Times. 14 August 1923. p. 4.
- "Echo of the Gooding Case". The Times. 24 October 1921. p. 7.
- "Grant to Wrongly Convicted Woman". The Manchester Guardian. 28 October 1921. p. 3.
- Jones, Ellen E. (24 February 2024). "Wicked Little Letters Review – a Deliciously Sweary Poison-Pen Mystery". The Observer.
- "Libellous Card Mystery". The Leeds Mercury. 10 December 1921. p. 7.
- "Libels by Letter". Portsmouth Evening News. 16 October 1922. p. 7.
- "Littlehampton Letters Mystery". The Times. 12 July 1923. p. 9.
- "Littlehampton Libel Charge". The Times. 19 July 1923. p. 9.
- "Mrs Gooding's Accuser Freed". Nottingham Evening Post. 10 December 1921. p. 1.
- Buccieri, Sarah-May (22 September 2024). "Mysterious Hate Letters Turn Quiet Village to 'Poison'". BBC News.
- "The Littlehampton Libels". The Times. 10 December 1921. p. 7.

==== Internet ====
- "47–51, Western Road, Littlehampton". Historic England. n.d.
- "47–51, Western Road, Littlehampton – 1027801 – Official list". Historic England. n.d.
- "About Us". National Society for the Prevention of Cruelty to Children. n.d.
- Clark, Gregory (2023). "The Annual RPI and Average Earnings for Britain, 1209 to Present (New Series)". MeasuringWorth. Archived from the original on 1 April 2023.
- Cockayne, Emily (12 March 2024). "Wicked Little Letters: True Story of Edith Swan, Rose Gooding and the Littlehampton Libels". History Extra.
- Frost, Patrick (7 June 2012). "Great Britain Postage Due Mail: 1839 to the Present Day" (PDF). The Royal Philatelic Society.
- "Nigel (1123028)". Miramar Ship Index.
- "What are Listed Buildings?". Historic England. 10 July 2024.
- "Wicked Little Letters: The Littlehampton Libel Case". The National Archives. n.d.
