= EPCC (disambiguation) =

EPCC may refer to:

- EPCC (Formerly Edinburgh Parallel Computing Centre), part of the University of Edinburgh
- Estonian Philharmonic Chamber Choir
- East Preston Cricket Club, a village cricket club in West Sussex
- Ever Present Compensation Coefficient
- El Paso Community College, Texas, USA
- East Peoria Chamber of Commerce, Illinois, USA
- Exton PC Council, a personal computer user group in Chester County, Pennsylvania, USA
- the four phases of Engineering, Procurement, Construction and Commissioning as in Engineering, procurement and construction, a form of contracting agreement in the construction industry (additional C at the end of EPCC stands for the Commissioning activities, but it is some times dropped).
