= Eluned Allen-Williams =

British Girl Guide executive and heraldry expert (1916–1989)

- Allen-Williams from a 1990 issue of The Guider magazine
- Born: Eluned Jocelyn Allen-Williams; 1 May 1916; Littlehampton, England
- Died: 23 December 1989 (aged 73); Newport, Pembrokeshire, Wales
- Education: London University
- Occupations: Girl Guide executive Magistrate

Eluned Allen-Williams (1 May 1916 – 26 December 1989) was a Girl Guide Association (GGA) executive. Between 1945 and 1946 she was a Guide International Service (GIS) volunteer, serving in post-war Europe and providing relief work in Waldbröl and Dickhause, Germany. She was heraldry advisor to the GGA from 1967. She was a magistrate in East Preston, West Sussex for 27 years, and was the first woman to hold the position of chair of the Arundel bench in 1975.

== Personal life and education ==
Born to Brigadier General Sir Arthur Allen-Williams KBE, CMG (1916 – 1949) and Ursula Mary Allen, Allen-Williams had one brother and one sister. She attended Rosemead School in Littlehampton and Downe House School in Berkshire. She then studied science at London University. She was a "qualified hospital almoner", her role being "to determine the patients' ability to contribute towards their own medical care". She spent much of her life in Littlehampton, West Sussex.

In the 1930s she was an active member of the East Preston Rifle Club in Littlehampton, winning several shooting competitions. In 1938 she was a member of the City of London Rifle Club and at that point had the best average score in the national ladies' league. She was also a member of the Seagulls Ladies' Lacrosse Club and was a keen tennis player and sailor, owning an 18-foot centreboard sailing boat.

She moved to Newport, Pembrokeshire, where her family came from, in 1979.

== Girl Guides ==
Allen-Williams joined the Girl Guide movement as a Brownie. She moved through the organisation into leadership positions which included:

- Sea Ranger crew, captain, Littlehampton
- 2nd Apsley Company, captain
- 2nd Sussex Lone Rangers, lieutenant
- Sussex County boating advisor
- Sussex division Guide commissioner
- Sussex County ranger advisor
- Headquarters Ranger trainer
- Arts committee, member
- Chair and subsequently president of East Preston and Rustington Girl Guides from 1973 to 1979. When she resigned in 1979, she donated £500 to the local association. She also made an interest-free loan to help fund the building of their new headquarters.

During a 16-month trip to Australia and New Zealand she attended New Zealand Guide's centenary camp and trained Girl Guide leaders in Australia.

Her principal passion was sailing. She became lieutenant of Sea Ranger Ship (SRS) Victor in 1942, captain of SRS Vigilant in 1947 and lieutenant of Lone SRS Opportune in 1948. She published The Girl Guide Knot Book in 1962.

Allen-Williams became heraldry consultant to the GGA in 1967.

== World War II and Guide International Service ==
During WWII Allen-Williams worked as an almoner in London hospitals, including Brookwood Emergency Hospital, Woking, Kingston County Hospital and Hemel Hempstead Base Hospital.

In 1945 Allen-Williams volunteered with the Guide International Service. She joined Relief Section 131, working with displaced people in Waldbröl and Hanover in Germany.

== Littlehampton ==
Allen-Williams became a justice of the peace (JP) on the Arundel bench in Littlehampton in 1949, serving for 27 years. In 1975 she became the first female chair.

She was a vice-president of the East Preston Cricket Club. In 1962, when the club was unable to find an eleventh player for a match, she joined the team, having not played since she was at school, and "proved a valuable asset [...] especially when fielding at mid-off."

She was president of the Littlehampton Dramatic Society for 12 years, having taken on the role from her mother, and a member of the Rustington Horticultural and Allotments Holders Association for ten years.

Allen-Williams was a regular speaker for local organisations such as the Women's Institute, the Trefoil Guild and East Preston & Kingston Preservation Society. Topics included "The History of East Preston", "Introduction to heraldry", "Sharing the experiences of a JP", "Norwegian coastal trip", "A walk along the Sussex Downs", "My world tour", and "Birds of Australia and New Zealand".
