= East Preston =

East Preston may refer to:

- East Preston, Nova Scotia, a rural area of Halifax Regional Municipality, Nova Scotia, Canada
- East Preston, West Sussex, a civil parish in Arun, West Sussex, England
- East Preston Cricket Club, a village cricket club based in East Preston, West Sussex, England
- East Preston F.C., a football club based in East Preston, West Sussex, England

== See also ==
- Preston (disambiguation)
