= Listed buildings in Arundel =

Civil Parish in East Sussex, England

Arundel is a town and civil parish in the Arun district, in West Sussex, England It contains four grade I, eight grade II* and 198 grade II listed buildings that are recorded in the National Heritage List for England.

This list is based on the information retrieved online from Historic England.

== Key ==
Grade	Criteria
I	Buildings that are of exceptional interest
II*	Particularly important buildings of more than special interest
II	Buildings that are of special interest

== Listing ==
Name	Grade	Location	Type	Completed (Note: The date given is the date used by Historic England as significant for the initial building or that of an important part in the structure's description.)	Date designated	Grid ref. (Note: The grid reference is based on the British national grid reference system, sometimes known as OSGB36, used by the Ordnance Survey.) Geo-coordinates	Notes	Entry number (Note: The "List Entry Number" is a unique number assigned to each listed building and scheduled monument by Historic England.)	Image	Wikidata
4 and 4a, Arun Street	II	4 and 4a, Arun Street			7 October 1974	TQ0163606960; 50°51′12″N 0°33′27″W		1353708	4 and 4a, Arun Street More images	Q26636617
6, Arun Street	II	6, Arun Street			7 October 1974	TQ0163906955; 50°51′11″N 0°33′27″W		1027929	6, Arun Street More images	Q26278894
8-18, Arun Street	II	8-18, Arun Street			7 October 1974	TQ0165006942; 50°51′11″N 0°33′26″W		1353709	8-18, Arun Street More images	Q26636618
11 and 13, Arun Street	II	11 and 13, Arun Street			7 October 1974	TQ0167306946; 50°51′11″N 0°33′25″W		1027930	11 and 13, Arun Street More images	Q26278895
Arundel Castle	I	Arundel Castle			26 March 1949	TQ0191807254; 50°51′21″N 0°33′12″W		1027926	Arundel Castle More images	Q716667
Greenhouses	II	Arundel Castle			17 May 1995	TQ0151907256; 50°51′21″N 0°33′33″W		1248539	Greenhouses More images	Q26540747
Arundel Park House, Including Garden Walls And Terrace	II	Arundel Park			22 October 2013	TQ0125407845; 50°51′41″N 0°33′46″W		1414107	Upload Photo	Q26676394
Hiorns Tower	II*	Arundel Park			26 March 1949	TQ0128608085; 50°51′48″N 0°33′44″W		1353747	Hiorns Tower More images	Q17553551
Pedestal Near Hiorns Tower	II	Arundel Park			7 October 1974	TQ0126608057; 50°51′47″N 0°33′45″W		1027927	Upload Photo	Q26278891
Posts	II	Bakers Arms Hill			7 October 1974	TQ0168207088; 50°51′16″N 0°33′25″W		1353710	Upload Photo	Q26636619
1, Bakers Arms Hill	II	1, Bakers Arms Hill			26 March 1949	TQ0169007089; 50°51′16″N 0°33′24″W		1027931	Upload Photo	Q26278897
2, Bakers Arms Hill	II	2, Bakers Arms Hill			26 March 1949	TQ0168507068; 50°51′15″N 0°33′24″W		1027932	Upload Photo	Q26278898
6, Bakers Arms Hill	II	6, Bakers Arms Hill			26 March 1949	TQ0169407057; 50°51′15″N 0°33′24″W		1353711	Upload Photo	Q26636620
The Victory Public House	II	1 and 3, Bond Street			7 October 1974	TQ0146707112; 50°51′17″N 0°33′35″W		1027933	Upload Photo	Q26278900
2-24, Bond Street	II	2-24, Bond Street			7 October 1974	TQ0144307138; 50°51′18″N 0°33′37″W		1263855	Upload Photo	Q26554612
5-23, Bond Street	II	5-23, Bond Street			7 October 1974	TQ0143507123; 50°51′17″N 0°33′37″W		1353712	Upload Photo	Q26636621
The Brewery	II	Brewery Hill			7 October 1974	TQ0170706987; 50°51′12″N 0°33′23″W		1263856	The Brewery More images	Q26554613
Wall on North Side of Garden to No 3	II	Brewery Hill			7 October 1974	TQ0174506980; 50°51′12″N 0°33′21″W		1027935	Upload Photo	Q26278902
3, Brewery Hill	II	3, Brewery Hill			7 October 1974	TQ0174906985; 50°51′12″N 0°33′21″W		1027934	Upload Photo	Q26278901
Horse Gin at No 14 to the North East of the Farmhouse	II	Chichester Road			7 October 1974	TQ0040907452; 50°51′28″N 0°34′29″W		1027936	Upload Photo	Q26278903
Series of Barns at No 14 Forming a Courtyard to the South East of the Farmhouse	II	Chichester Road			7 October 1974	TQ0040907409; 50°51′27″N 0°34′29″W		1247969	Upload Photo	Q26540222
Park Farmhouse	II	14, Chichester Road			26 March 1949	TQ0036607416; 50°51′27″N 0°34′31″W		1353713	Upload Photo	Q26636622
Windmill	II	Fitzalan Road			5 June 1969	TQ0127806361; 50°50′52″N 0°33′46″W		1353714	Windmill More images	Q7567915
Manor Farmhouse	II	Ford Road, Tortington			5 June 1958	TQ0034004968; 50°50′08″N 0°34′35″W		1274879	Upload Photo	Q26564505
The Parish Church of St Mary Magdalene	II	Ford Road, Tortington			5 June 1958	TQ0031104984; 50°50′09″N 0°34′37″W		1222209	Upload Photo	Q7594584
Arundel War Memorial	II	High Street			30 March 2015	TQ0188707094; 50°51′16″N 0°33′14″W		1425702	Arundel War Memorial More images	Q26677220
Streetlamp to South by West Side of Bridge	II	High Street			7 October 1974	TQ0194407024; 50°51′14″N 0°33′11″W		1247983	Upload Photo	Q26540233
Town Gate and Castle Walls	II	High Street			7 October 1974	TQ0176907227; 50°51′20″N 0°33′20″W		1248038	Town Gate and Castle Walls More images	Q26540284
1, High Street	II	1, High Street			7 October 1974	TQ0191907032; 50°51′14″N 0°33′12″W		1027937	1, High Street More images	Q26278904
2 Streetlamps to North Flanking War Memorial	II	High Street			7 October 1974	TQ0188807096; 50°51′16″N 0°33′14″W		1027940	Upload Photo	Q26278907
2-8, High Street	II	2-8, High Street			7 October 1974	TQ0194007071; 50°51′15″N 0°33′11″W		1027905	2-8, High Street More images	Q26278871
8a, High Street	II	8a, High Street			7 October 1974	TQ0192007092; 50°51′16″N 0°33′12″W		1353737	8a, High Street More images	Q26636641
10, High Street	II	10, High Street			7 October 1974	TQ0191507093; 50°51′16″N 0°33′13″W		1027906	10, High Street More images	Q26278872
11, High Street	II	11, High Street			26 March 1949	TQ0192807057; 50°51′15″N 0°33′12″W		1027938	11, High Street More images	Q26278905
12, High Street	II	12, High Street			7 October 1974	TQ0191207096; 50°51′16″N 0°33′13″W		1027907	12, High Street More images	Q26278873
13 and 15, High Street	II	13 and 15, High Street			7 October 1974	TQ0191907070; 50°51′15″N 0°33′12″W		1247978	13 and 15, High Street More images	Q26540230
17, High Street	II	17, High Street			26 March 1949	TQ0191107076; 50°51′15″N 0°33′13″W		1353715	Upload Photo	Q26636624
18 and 20, High Street	II	18 and 20, High Street			5 June 1969	TQ0189207113; 50°51′16″N 0°33′14″W		1353738	18 and 20, High Street More images	Q26636642
19, High Street	II	19, High Street			26 March 1949	TQ0190307073; 50°51′15″N 0°33′13″W		1247981	19, High Street More images	Q26540232
The Norfolk Hotel	II*	22, High Street			26 March 1949	TQ0188407122; 50°51′17″N 0°33′14″W		1027908	The Norfolk Hotel More images	Q17553464
23, High Street	II	23, High Street			7 October 1974	TQ0191007053; 50°51′14″N 0°33′13″W		1027939	23, High Street More images	Q26278906
24, High Street	II	24, High Street			5 June 1969	TQ0186907133; 50°51′17″N 0°33′15″W		1353739	24, High Street More images	Q26636643
25 25a and 25b, High Street	II	25 25a and 25b, High Street			7 October 1974	TQ0191307043; 50°51′14″N 0°33′13″W		1353716	25 25a and 25b, High Street More images	Q26636625
26, High Street	II	26, High Street			5 June 1969	TQ0186507136; 50°51′17″N 0°33′15″W		1027909	26, High Street More images	Q26278874
28 High Street and railings to No 28	II	28, High Street, BN18 9AB			26 March 1949	TQ0185907141; 50°51′17″N 0°33′15″W		1027910	28 High Street and railings to No 28 More images	Q26278875
The Swan Public House	II	29, High Street			7 October 1974	TQ0189007034; 50°51′14″N 0°33′14″W		1263833	The Swan Public House More images	Q26554594
30-34, High Street	II	30-34, High Street			26 March 1949	TQ0185107151; 50°51′18″N 0°33′16″W		1353740	30-34, High Street More images	Q26636644
31, High Street	II	31, High Street			26 October 1970	TQ0188607052; 50°51′14″N 0°33′14″W		1027941	31, High Street More images	Q26278908
Stenton House	II	33, High Street			7 October 1974	TQ0188307061; 50°51′15″N 0°33′14″W		1027942	Stenton House More images	Q26278911
37 37a 39 41 and 41a, High Street	II	37 37a 39 41 and 41a, High Street			5 June 1969	TQ0187807076; 50°51′15″N 0°33′15″W		1263834	37 37a 39 41 and 41a, High Street More images	Q26554595
43, High Street	II	43, High Street			7 October 1974	TQ0187207086; 50°51′16″N 0°33′15″W		1027943	43, High Street More images	Q26278912
51, High Street	II*	51, High Street			7 October 1974	TQ0184707112; 50°51′16″N 0°33′16″W		1263836	51, High Street More images	Q17553513
53, High Street	II	53, High Street			7 October 1974	TQ0184107120; 50°51′17″N 0°33′16″W		1027945	53, High Street More images	Q26278914
The Swan Public House	II	55-57, High Street, BN18 9AJ			5 June 1969	TQ0183307129; 50°51′17″N 0°33′17″W		1247998	The Swan Public House More images	Q26540248
59, High Street	II	59, High Street			26 March 1949	TQ0182707136; 50°51′17″N 0°33′17″W		1027946	59, High Street More images	Q26278915
61 High Street and railings to No 61	II*	61, High Street, BN18 9AJ			26 March 1949	TQ0182107141; 50°51′17″N 0°33′17″W		1027947	61 High Street and railings to No 61 More images	Q17553478
63, High Street	II	63, High Street			26 March 1949	TQ0181007149; 50°51′18″N 0°33′18″W		1248003	Upload Photo	Q26540253
65, High Street	II	65, High Street			5 June 1969	TQ0180707154; 50°51′18″N 0°33′18″W		1027948	65, High Street More images	Q26278916
67, High Street, 1, Maltravers Street	II	67, High Street, 1, Maltravers Street			26 March 1949	TQ0180307159; 50°51′18″N 0°33′18″W		1353735	67, High Street, 1, Maltravers Street More images	Q26636639
69, High Street	II	69, High Street			7 October 1974	TQ0179007174; 50°51′18″N 0°33′19″W		1027904	69, High Street More images	Q26278870
71, High Street	II	71, High Street			5 June 1969	TQ0178107182; 50°51′19″N 0°33′19″W		1353736	71, High Street More images	Q26636640
13-43, King Street	II	13-43, King Street			7 October 1974	TQ0147307072; 50°51′15″N 0°33′35″W		1027911	13-43, King Street More images	Q26278877
24-30, King Street	II	24-30, King Street			7 October 1974	TQ0148807113; 50°51′17″N 0°33′34″W		1263832	Upload Photo	Q26554593
Chantry Cottage	II	36, King Street			7 October 1974	TQ0148707145; 50°51′18″N 0°33′34″W		1353741	Chantry Cottage More images	Q26636645
Former Stables to No 51 Maltravers Street And Wall Of No 51 On West Side Of Baker's Arms Hill	II	Kings Arms Hill			7 October 1974	TQ0160707009; 50°51′13″N 0°33′28″W		1248057	Upload Photo	Q26540300
Posts	II	Kings Arms Hill			7 October 1974	TQ0159507040; 50°51′14″N 0°33′29″W		1353742	Upload Photo	Q26685484
Stables (tamplins Brewery)	II	Kings Arms Hill			7 October 1974	TQ0160906998; 50°51′13″N 0°33′28″W		1248054	Upload Photo	Q26540297
2, Kings Arms Hill	II	2, Kings Arms Hill			7 October 1974	TQ0160506994; 50°51′13″N 0°33′29″W		1027912	Upload Photo	Q26278878
Arundel Cathedral of Our Lady & St Philip Howard and Piers Surrounding Churchyard	I	London Road, BN18 9AY			26 March 1949	TQ0152607174; 50°51′19″N 0°33′32″W		1248090	Arundel Cathedral of Our Lady & St Philip Howard and Piers Surrounding Churchyard More images	Q1349741
Brick Gatepiers to West of No 1	II	London Road			7 October 1974	TQ0163407183; 50°51′19″N 0°33′27″W		1027917	Upload Photo	Q26278881
Butlers Lodge Arundel Castle	II	London Road, Arundel Castle			7 October 1974	TQ0133907402; 50°51′26″N 0°33′42″W		1027916	Upload Photo	Q26278880
Cemetery Cross in the Roman Catholic Cemetery	II	London Road			4 March 1983	TQ0139307244; 50°51′21″N 0°33′39″W		1277862	Upload Photo	Q26567243
Church of St Nicholas	I	London Road			26 March 1949	TQ0163907253; 50°51′21″N 0°33′27″W		1027914	Church of St Nicholas	Q17528730
Deer Barn Attached to Se End of the Racing Stables	II	London Road			4 March 1983	TQ0144407449; 50°51′28″N 0°33′36″W		1248529	Upload Photo	Q26540738
East South and West Walls of the Kitchen Garden of Arundel Castle and Extension of the South Wall Further West to the Butlers Lodge	II	London Road			7 October 1974	TQ0154207204; 50°51′20″N 0°33′32″W		1263815	Upload Photo	Q26554578
Fitzalan Chapel	I	London Road			26 March 1949	TQ0167207259; 50°51′21″N 0°33′25″W		1263812	Fitzalan Chapel More images	Q5455570
Lodge to Arundel Park 100 Yds East of London Road Including Walls	II	London Road, Arundel Park			7 October 1974	TQ0079508250; 50°51′54″N 0°34′09″W		1248085	Upload Photo	Q26540326
Lychgate to Roman Catholic Cemetery	II	London Road			7 October 1974	TQ0140407256; 50°51′21″N 0°33′39″W		1248092	Upload Photo	Q26540332
Pavement Leading to the Churchyard of Church of St Nicholas	II	London Road, BN18 9AT			7 October 1974	TQ0163707204; 50°51′20″N 0°33′27″W		1248075	Upload Photo	Q26540318
Raised Pavement in Front of Tower House Including Railings	II	London Road			7 October 1974	TQ0166607186; 50°51′19″N 0°33′25″W		1027918	Upload Photo	Q26278882
South and West Walls of the Churchyard of Church of St Nicholas	II	London Road			7 October 1974	TQ0159707197; 50°51′19″N 0°33′29″W		1353744	Upload Photo	Q26636648
St Marys Gate Public House	II	London Road			5 June 1969	TQ0147607203; 50°51′20″N 0°33′35″W		1027919	St Marys Gate Public House More images	Q26278883
St Marys Hall and Wall to Mount Pleasant	II	London Road			7 October 1974	TQ0142007229; 50°51′20″N 0°33′38″W		1027920	Upload Photo	Q26278884
St Nicholas Church Gateway	II	London Road			7 October 1974	TQ0163507215; 50°51′20″N 0°33′27″W		1353743	Upload Photo	Q26636647
St Phillips Roman Catholic Primary School	II	London Road			4 March 1983	TQ0134607284; 50°51′22″N 0°33′41″W		1248531	Upload Photo	Q26540740
The Priory (st Wilfred'S)	II*	London Road			7 October 1974	TQ0168107206; 50°51′20″N 0°33′24″W		1027913	The Priory (st Wilfred'S) More images	Q17553474
Tower House and No 1 Railings to Tower House and No 1	II	London Road			5 June 1969	TQ0165407176; 50°51′19″N 0°33′26″W		1353745	Tower House and No 1 Railings to Tower House and No 1 More images	Q26636649
Wall of Tower House to North and East of Garden and of No 14 Maltravers Street Continuing to West of Toewr House As Far As Parsons Hill	II	London Road			7 October 1974	TQ0171007185; 50°51′19″N 0°33′23″W		1248088	Upload Photo	Q26540329
Wall To Garden Of Tower House	II	London Road, Parsons Hill			7 September 1974	TQ0157707177; 50°51′19″N 0°33′30″W		1253719	Upload Photo	Q26545446
Walls of Churchyard of St Nicholas Church Immediately Flanking the Gateway	II	London Road			7 October 1974	TQ0162607216; 50°51′20″N 0°33′27″W		1027915	Upload Photo	Q26278879
7, London Road	II	7, London Road			4 March 1983	TQ0133007323; 50°51′24″N 0°33′42″W		1277914	Upload Photo	Q26567293
9 and 11, London Road	II	9 and 11, London Road			4 March 1983	TQ0129607361; 50°51′25″N 0°33′44″W		1277860	Upload Photo	Q26567242
Coachhouse At No 48 No 48 Including Railings	II	Maltravers Street			5 June 1969	TQ0156207045; 50°51′14″N 0°33′31″W		1278042	Upload Photo	Q26567410
Number 26 (The Vicarage) And Stables At No 26	II*	Maltravers Street			26 March 1949	TQ0164807097; 50°51′16″N 0°33′26″W		1278040	Number 26 (The Vicarage) And Stables At No 26 More images	Q17553541
Old Market House	II	Maltravers Street, BN18 9BU			26 March 1949	TQ0167407115; 50°51′17″N 0°33′25″W		1278039	Upload Photo	Q26567408
Raised Pavement Behind and Above Longer Raised Pavement in Front of Nos 32 to 38 (even)	II	Maltravers Street			7 October 1974	TQ0162107071; 50°51′15″N 0°33′28″W		1248159	Upload Photo	Q26540396
Raised Pavement from West of No 51 As Far West As School Lane Incl Railings	II	Maltravers Street			7 October 1974	TQ0151806989; 50°51′13″N 0°33′33″W		1372083	Upload Photo	Q26653210
Raised Pavement in Front of Nos 20 to 38 (even) Including Railings	II	Maltravers Street			7 October 1974	TQ0167107098; 50°51′16″N 0°33′25″W		1278041	Upload Photo	Q26567409
Raised Pavement in Front of Nos 48 to 58 (even) Ending at Corner of King Street Including Railings	II	Maltravers Street			7 October 1974	TQ0153807014; 50°51′13″N 0°33′32″W		1248221	Upload Photo	Q26540450
Retaining Wall to Garden on South and East Sides of No 60	II	Maltravers Street			7 October 1974	TQ0149406981; 50°51′12″N 0°33′34″W		1248236	Upload Photo	Q26540462
South Garden Wall Of No 13 Wall To Garden Of Nos 13 And 15 Maltravers Street	II	Maltravers Street			7 October 1974	TQ0173907055; 50°51′15″N 0°33′22″W		1277927	Upload Photo	Q26567306
Stables to No 15	II	Maltravers Street			5 June 1969	TQ0170707100; 50°51′16″N 0°33′23″W		1248111	Upload Photo	Q26540351
The Little House	II	Maltravers Street			26 March 1949	TQ0167907082; 50°51′16″N 0°33′25″W		1278056	Upload Photo	Q26567422
Town Hall	II	Maltravers Street			5 June 1969	TQ0177307146; 50°51′18″N 0°33′20″W		1027921	Town Hall More images	Q26278885
Wall to West of No 51	II	Maltravers Street			7 October 1974	TQ0157807030; 50°51′14″N 0°33′30″W		1353765	Upload Photo	Q26636664
2 and 4, Maltravers Street	II	2 and 4, Maltravers Street			7 October 1974	TQ0177907167; 50°51′18″N 0°33′19″W		1248149	Upload Photo	Q26540386
3, Maltravers Street	II	3, Maltravers Street			5 June 1969	TQ0175607141; 50°51′17″N 0°33′21″W		1248094	Upload Photo	Q26540334
5, Maltravers Street	II	5, Maltravers Street			5 June 1969	TQ0174607135; 50°51′17″N 0°33′21″W		1027922	Upload Photo	Q26278886
6, Maltravers Street	II	6, Maltravers Street			5 June 1969	TQ0176707162; 50°51′18″N 0°33′20″W		1248150	Upload Photo	Q26540387
8, Maltravers Street	II	8, Maltravers Street			5 June 1969	TQ0175707159; 50°51′18″N 0°33′21″W		1248151	8, Maltravers Street More images	Q26540388
10, Maltravers Street	II	10, Maltravers Street			5 June 1969	TQ0174907159; 50°51′18″N 0°33′21″W		1248152	10, Maltravers Street More images	Q26540389
11, Maltravers Street	II	11, Maltravers Street			7 October 1974	TQ0173007123; 50°51′17″N 0°33′22″W		1027923	Upload Photo	Q26278887
Duff House	II	13, Maltravers Street			26 March 1949	TQ0172307116; 50°51′17″N 0°33′22″W		1248100	Upload Photo	Q26540340
Number 14 Maltravers Street	II	14, Maltravers Street			26 March 1949	TQ0171607140; 50°51′17″N 0°33′23″W		1248153	Upload Photo	Q26540390
15, Maltravers Street	II	15, Maltravers Street			5 June 1969	TQ0171507107; 50°51′16″N 0°33′23″W		1027924	Upload Photo	Q26278889
Number 16 Maltravers Street	II	16, Maltravers Street			26 March 1949	TQ0170807135; 50°51′17″N 0°33′23″W		1248154	Upload Photo	Q26540391
17-21, Maltravers Street	II	17-21, Maltravers Street			26 March 1949	TQ0169807095; 50°51′16″N 0°33′24″W		1027925	Upload Photo	Q26278890
Number 18 And Railings To No 18	II	18, Maltravers Street			26 March 1949	TQ0169907131; 50°51′17″N 0°33′24″W		1248155	Upload Photo	Q26540392
25-29, Maltravers Street	II	25-29, Maltravers Street			5 June 1969	TQ0166907071; 50°51′15″N 0°33′25″W		1027882	Upload Photo	Q26278848
31, Maltravers Street	II	31, Maltravers Street			5 June 1969	TQ0165907063; 50°51′15″N 0°33′26″W		1353764	Upload Photo	Q26636663
38, Maltravers Street (See Details For Further Address Information)	II	38, Maltravers Street			7 October 1974	TQ0160607069; 50°51′15″N 0°33′28″W		1248158	Upload Photo	Q26540395
40-44, Maltravers Street	II	40-44, Maltravers Street			5 June 1969	TQ0159907064; 50°51′15″N 0°33′29″W		1278026	Upload Photo	Q26567397
45 47 and 49, Maltravers Street, Including Garden Wall To West Wyke House	II	45 47 and 49, Maltravers Street			5 June 1969	TQ0161907041; 50°51′14″N 0°33′28″W		1248127	Upload Photo	Q26540367
46, Maltravers Street	II	46, Maltravers Street			26 March 1949	TQ0157607051; 50°51′15″N 0°33′30″W		1278004	46, Maltravers Street More images	Q26567377
50, 52 (Sun House) And 54, Maltravers Street	II	50, Maltravers Street, BN18 9BQ			5 June 1969	TQ0153907029; 50°51′14″N 0°33′32″W		1248199	Upload Photo	Q26540431
51, Maltravers Street	II	51, Maltravers Street, BN18 9BQ			26 March 1949	TQ0159007029; 50°51′14″N 0°33′29″W		1027883	Upload Photo	Q26278849
Sennen	II	53, Maltravers Street			5 June 1969	TQ0157307018; 50°51′14″N 0°33′30″W		1027884	Upload Photo	Q26278850
56, Maltravers Street	II	56, Maltravers Street			7 October 1974	TQ0152107006; 50°51′13″N 0°33′33″W		1248160	Upload Photo	Q26540397
Harley House Railings To No 55 And 57	II	57, Maltravers Street			26 March 1949	TQ0155907009; 50°51′13″N 0°33′31″W		1248143	Upload Photo	Q26540380
58, Maltravers Street	II	58, Maltravers Street			7 October 1974	TQ0150707007; 50°51′13″N 0°33′34″W		1248161	Upload Photo	Q26540398
Railings To Nos 59 And 61	II	59 and 61, Maltravers Street			26 March 1949	TQ0154507000; 50°51′13″N 0°33′32″W		1353766	Upload Photo	Q26636665
Surrey House	II	60, Maltravers Street			7 October 1974	TQ0148106994; 50°51′13″N 0°33′35″W		1278043	Upload Photo	Q26567411
63, 67 and 69, Maltravers Street	II	63, 67 and 69, Maltravers Street			7 October 1974	TQ0152706990; 50°51′13″N 0°33′33″W		1027885	63, 67 and 69, Maltravers Street More images	Q26278851
71 and 73, Maltravers Street	II	71 and 73, Maltravers Street			7 October 1974	TQ0151706982; 50°51′12″N 0°33′33″W		1278037	Upload Photo	Q26567406
Rock Cottage	II	72, Maltravers Street			7 October 1974	TQ0144506954; 50°51′12″N 0°33′37″W		1248162	Upload Photo	Q26540399
74-84, Maltravers Street	II	74-84, Maltravers Street			7 October 1974	TQ0142306943; 50°51′11″N 0°33′38″W		1277987	Upload Photo	Q26567360
77, Maltravers Street	II	77, Maltravers Street			7 October 1974	TQ0151006976; 50°51′12″N 0°33′33″W		1027886	Upload Photo	Q26278852
Fernleigh	II	79, Maltravers Street			26 March 1949	TQ0150106969; 50°51′12″N 0°33′34″W		1248148	Upload Photo	Q26540385
81 and 83, Maltravers Street	II	81 and 83, Maltravers Street			7 October 1974	TQ0149206964; 50°51′12″N 0°33′34″W		1039943	Upload Photo	Q26291743
Bridge	II	Mill Road, South Stoke			7 October 1974	TQ0189107731; 50°51′36″N 0°33′13″W		1248259	Bridge More images	Q26540485
Bridge Gates Arundel Castle	II	Mill Road			7 October 1974	TQ0199307120; 50°51′17″N 0°33′09″W		1248251	Upload Photo	Q26540477
Farm Buildings to North of Dairy at Home Farm	II	Mill Road			7 October 1974	TQ0181107727; 50°51′36″N 0°33′17″W		1278045	Upload Photo	Q26567413
Home Farmhouse	II	Mill Road			7 October 1974	TQ0182107684; 50°51′35″N 0°33′17″W		1248164	Upload Photo	Q26540401
K6 Telephone Kiosk	II	Mill Road			6 September 1987	TQ0197207070; 50°51′15″N 0°33′10″W		1248534	Upload Photo	Q26540742
Maison Dieu	II	Mill Road			26 March 1949	TQ0196207096; 50°51′16″N 0°33′10″W		1248163	Upload Photo	Q17644240
Ornamental Dairy to North of Home Farmhouse	II	Mill Road			7 October 1974	TQ0181807696; 50°51′35″N 0°33′17″W		1277991	Upload Photo	Q26567364
Stone Tables Outside Arundel Museum	II	Mill Road, BN18 9PA			7 October 1974	TQ0200907068; 50°51′15″N 0°33′08″W		1278044	Upload Photo	Q26567412
Arundel Youth Centre Outhouse To South West Wall Bounding North Side Of Courtyard And Railings Bounding West Side Of Courtyard	II	Mount Pleasant			7 October 1974	TQ0140007075; 50°51′16″N 0°33′39″W		1248268	Upload Photo	Q26540494
Garden Wall of No 33 to the West of the House	II	Mount Pleasant			7 October 1974	TQ0138607097; 50°51′16″N 0°33′40″W		1277996	Upload Photo	Q26567369
1-17, Mount Pleasant	II	1-17, Mount Pleasant			7 October 1974	TQ0143207170; 50°51′19″N 0°33′37″W		1278046	Upload Photo	Q26567414
2 Posts At West End Of Bond Street	II	Mount Pleasant			7 October 1974	TQ0140007138; 50°51′18″N 0°33′39″W		1248263	Upload Photo	Q26540489
19, Mount Pleasant	II	19, Mount Pleasant			7 October 1974	TQ0140607133; 50°51′17″N 0°33′39″W		1248166	Upload Photo	Q26540403
21 and 23, Mount Pleasant	II	21 and 23, Mount Pleasant			7 October 1974	TQ0140207127; 50°51′17″N 0°33′39″W		1248167	Upload Photo	Q26540404
Stable Cottage	II	33, Mount Pleasant			7 October 1974	TQ0139807090; 50°51′16″N 0°33′39″W		1248265	Upload Photo	Q26540491
Wall to Garden of No 14 Maltravers Street	II	New Cut			7 October 1974	TQ0172807142; 50°51′17″N 0°33′22″W		1277998	Upload Photo	Q26567371
8, Orchard Place	II	8, Orchard Place			7 October 1974	TQ0152607075; 50°51′15″N 0°33′32″W		1248271	Upload Photo	Q26540497
9, Orchard Place	II	9, Orchard Place			7 October 1974	TQ0150807057; 50°51′15″N 0°33′33″W		1248270	Upload Photo	Q26540496
12-16, Orchard Place	II	12-16, Orchard Place			7 October 1974	TQ0152407088; 50°51′16″N 0°33′33″W		1248272	Upload Photo	Q26540498
13-25, Orchard Place	II	13-25, Orchard Place			7 October 1974	TQ0151207079; 50°51′16″N 0°33′33″W		1277999	Upload Photo	Q26567372
Stable of No 4	II	Park Place			7 October 1974	TQ0144307003; 50°51′13″N 0°33′37″W		1248319	Upload Photo	Q26540540
6, Park Place	II	6, Park Place			12 January 1976	TQ0142807010; 50°51′13″N 0°33′38″W		1277856	Upload Photo	Q26567238
8 and 8a, Park Place	II	8 and 8a, Park Place			7 October 1974	TQ0142407016; 50°51′14″N 0°33′38″W		1278000	Upload Photo	Q26567373
Garden Wall of No 2	II	Parsons Hill			7 October 1974	TQ0157207114; 50°51′17″N 0°33′30″W		1248273	Upload Photo	Q26540499
Cathedral Clergy House	II	2, Parsons Hill			7 October 1974	TQ0155407149; 50°51′18″N 0°33′31″W		1248328	Upload Photo	Q26540549
Tortington Priory Barn, To The North Of Priory Farm	II*	To The North Of Priory Farm, Priory Road			20 September 1984	TQ0065605968; 50°50′40″N 0°34′18″W		1221996	Upload Photo	Q17553495
Maltings in Garden of No 2	II	Queen Street			7 October 1974	TQ0204406934; 50°51′11″N 0°33′06″W		1248274	Upload Photo	Q26540500
1-5, Queen Street	II	1-5, Queen Street			7 October 1974	TQ0203306892; 50°51′09″N 0°33′07″W		1278001	Upload Photo	Q26567374
The Cottage	II	2, Queen Street			7 October 1974	TQ0205806917; 50°51′10″N 0°33′05″W		1277934	Upload Photo	Q26567313
10, Queen Street	II	10, Queen Street			7 October 1974	TQ0201906952; 50°51′11″N 0°33′07″W		1250259	Upload Photo	Q26542317
20, Queen Street	II	20, Queen Street			7 October 1974	TQ0201606995; 50°51′13″N 0°33′08″W		1248355	Upload Photo	Q26540575
20a 22 and 24, Queen Street	II	20a 22 and 24, Queen Street			7 October 1974	TQ0201507005; 50°51′13″N 0°33′08″W		1248275	Upload Photo	Q26540501
Wall from West Edge of Car Park to North East Corner of No 5	II	River Road			7 October 1974	TQ0186606997; 50°51′13″N 0°33′15″W		1248360	Upload Photo	Q26540580
Warehouse Arun River Board	II	River Road			7 October 1974	TQ0173706938; 50°51′11″N 0°33′22″W		1248276	Upload Photo	Q26540502
The Antique Market	II	5, River Road			7 October 1974	TQ0186106983; 50°51′12″N 0°33′15″W		1277969	Upload Photo	Q26567344
Arundel River Board	II	24, River Road			7 October 1974	TQ0174306958; 50°51′12″N 0°33′22″W		1248277	Upload Photo	Q26540503
St Marys Gate	II	St Marys Gate			26 March 1949	TQ0154007311; 50°51′23″N 0°33′32″W		1027928	Upload Photo	Q26278893
Arundel River Board	II	7-25, Surrey Street			5 June 1969	TQ0145706910; 50°51′10″N 0°33′36″W		1248362	Upload Photo	Q26681290
Stables to No 54	II	Tarrant Street			7 October 1974	TQ0155306938; 50°51′11″N 0°33′31″W		1248474	Upload Photo	Q26540685
The Union Church Garden Walls and Piers to North of Union Church	II	Tarrant Street			7 October 1974	TQ0177307037; 50°51′14″N 0°33′20″W		1277924	The Union Church Garden Walls and Piers to North of Union Church More images	Q7842716
Wall between Nos 49 and 51 with Ramped Return to No 51	II	Tarrant Street			7 October 1974	TQ0168707013; 50°51′13″N 0°33′24″W		1248417	Upload Photo	Q26540633
1-3, Tarrant Street, 49, High Street	II	1-3, Tarrant Street			7 October 1974	TQ0185807099; 50°51′16″N 0°33′16″W		1027944	1-3, Tarrant Street, 49, High Street More images	Q26278913
The Victoria Institute	II	10, Tarrant Street			7 October 1974	TQ0172407053; 50°51′15″N 0°33′22″W		1248420	The Victoria Institute More images	Q26540636
Walker House	II	12 and 14, Tarrant Street			7 October 1974	TQ0171407047; 50°51′14″N 0°33′23″W		1248460	Walker House More images	Q26540671
13 and 15, Tarrant Street	II	13 and 15, Tarrant Street			7 October 1974	TQ0182507084; 50°51′16″N 0°33′17″W		1248397	Upload Photo	Q26540613
Avola House	II	16, Tarrant Street			26 March 1949	TQ0169607043; 50°51′14″N 0°33′24″W		1248461	Avola House More images	Q26540672
The Arundel Emporium	II	18, Tarrant Street			1 December 1994	TQ0167807021; 50°51′14″N 0°33′25″W		1248536	The Arundel Emporium More images	Q26540744
19, Tarrant Street	II	19, Tarrant Street			7 October 1974	TQ0181507077; 50°51′15″N 0°33′18″W		1277917	Upload Photo	Q26567296
21 and 21a, Tarrant Street	II	21 and 21a, Tarrant Street			7 October 1974	TQ0180807074; 50°51′15″N 0°33′18″W		1277923	Upload Photo	Q26567302
33, Tarrant Street	II	33, Tarrant Street			7 October 1974	TQ0175507043; 50°51′14″N 0°33′21″W		1248416	33, Tarrant Street More images	Q26540632
34, Tarrant Street	II	34, Tarrant Street			26 March 1949	TQ0163706993; 50°51′13″N 0°33′27″W		1248462	34, Tarrant Street More images	Q26540673
The Kings Arms	II	36, Tarrant Street			7 October 1974	TQ0162106983; 50°51′12″N 0°33′28″W		1277910	The Kings Arms More images	Q26567289
38, Tarrant Street	II	38, Tarrant Street			7 October 1974	TQ0161406979; 50°51′12″N 0°33′28″W		1248467	Upload Photo	Q26540678
40, Tarrant Street	II	40, Tarrant Street			7 October 1974	TQ0160806975; 50°51′12″N 0°33′28″W		1248468	Upload Photo	Q26540679
42, Tarrant Street	II	42, Tarrant Street			26 March 1949	TQ0159906968; 50°51′12″N 0°33′29″W		1248469	Upload Photo	Q26540680
49, Tarrant Street, 43-47, Tarrant Street	II	43-47, Tarrant Street, 49 Tarrant Street			5 June 1969	TQ0170007013; 50°51′13″N 0°33′24″W		1277925	49, Tarrant Street, 43-47, Tarrant Street More images	Q26567304
Railings To No 44	II	44, Tarrant Street			26 March 1949	TQ0159306962; 50°51′12″N 0°33′29″W		1248470	Upload Photo	Q26540681
Railings To Nos 46 And 48	II	46 and 48, Tarrant Street			26 March 1949	TQ0158506957; 50°51′12″N 0°33′30″W		1248471	Upload Photo	Q26540682
50, Tarrant Street	II	50, Tarrant Street			7 October 1974	TQ0157806950; 50°51′11″N 0°33′30″W		1248472	Upload Photo	Q26540683
51 and 53, Tarrant Street	II	51 and 53, Tarrant Street			7 October 1974	TQ0167707001; 50°51′13″N 0°33′25″W		1277926	51 and 53, Tarrant Street More images	Q26567305
52, Tarrant Street	II	52, Tarrant Street			7 October 1974	TQ0156906945; 50°51′11″N 0°33′30″W		1248473	Upload Photo	Q26540684
South View	II	54, Tarrant Street			7 October 1974	TQ0156106941; 50°51′11″N 0°33′31″W		1277912	Upload Photo	Q26567291
55 55a and 57, Tarrant Street	II	55 55a and 57, Tarrant Street			7 October 1974	TQ0166906994; 50°51′13″N 0°33′25″W		1248418	55 55a and 57, Tarrant Street More images	Q26540634
56-62, Tarrant Street	II	56-62, Tarrant Street			7 October 1974	TQ0154506929; 50°51′11″N 0°33′32″W		1248513	Upload Photo	Q26540722
64, Tarrant Street	II	64, Tarrant Street			7 October 1974	TQ0153406923; 50°51′11″N 0°33′32″W		1277913	Upload Photo	Q26567292
70 and 70b, Tarrant Street	II	70 and 70b, Tarrant Street			7 October 1974	TQ0152206916; 50°51′10″N 0°33′33″W		1277893	Upload Photo	Q26567272
The Newburgh Arms	II	72 and 74, Tarrant Street			7 October 1974	TQ0151806913; 50°51′10″N 0°33′33″W		1248475	The Newburgh Arms More images	Q26540686
83 and 85, Tarrant Street	II	83 and 85, Tarrant Street			7 October 1974	TQ0159606941; 50°51′11″N 0°33′29″W		1248419	Upload Photo	Q26540635

== See also ==
- Grade I listed buildings in West Sussex
- Grade II* listed buildings in West Sussex
