= Arundel Priory =

Church in Arundel, West Sussex, England

Coordinates: 50.855786°N 0.557132°W

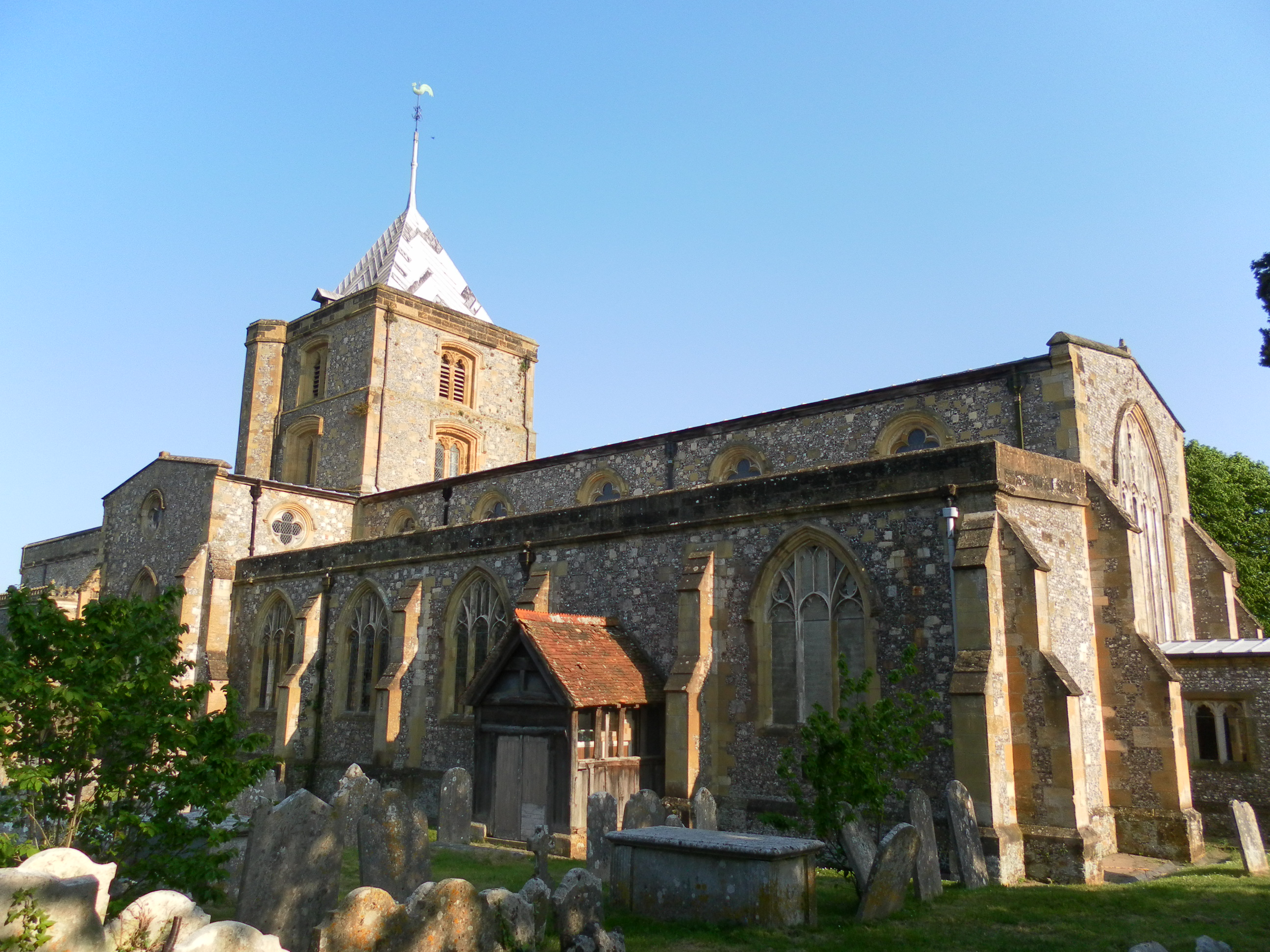
St Nicholas' Church, Arundel (NHLE Code 1027914).JPG

The Priory of St Nicholas was established at Arundel in West Sussex, England by Roger de Montgomery, earl of Shrewsbury, in 1102, when Gratian, a monk of Sées in Normandy, became first prior. In 1269, the priory granted Master William de Wedon, in return for various gifts, board and lodging, and a room in the priory in which he might conduct a school.

== Arundel College of the Holy Trinity ==
The priory was dissolved in 1380, when a college of the Holy Trinity with an adjoining hospice was established probably on the same site by Richard FitzAlan, 11th Earl of Arundel as a foundation to serve the needs of twenty aged poor men in the area and to provide education.

The buildings of the college are architecturally in the same style as the new parish church of the same date. The Fitzalan Chapel of the parish church formed the college's north side, and there were two-storeyed east, south and west ranges; the east range lies beyond the east end of the Fitzalan chapel, and the outer wall of the west range is aligned with the east wall of the south transept of the church.

In 1544 Arundel College was surrendered to the Crown, which then sold it back to the Earl of Arundel for 1,000 marks. It has remained in the hands of the Howard family since that time. For a period of nearly three centuries it lay derelict, much of it having been demolished and further damage inflicted on what remained during the course of the English Civil War in the seventeenth century

== St Wilfrid's Priory ==
There was a series of rebuildings and alterations in the late 18th and early 19th centuries to form an agent’s house, a laundry and then a Catholic chapel with attached chaplain’s residence. Between 1804 and 1815 the building was rebuilt in Gothic style when it housed a private school. Further restoration work was undertaken in the middle of the nineteenth century, when in 1861 the south-east range was converted as a convent known as St Wilfrid’s Priory, as it remained until the 1950s. At the same period the appearance of the north side of the courtyard was altered by the building of the funerary chapel of Henry Fitzalan-Howard, 14th Duke of Norfolk (d. 1860), which projects from the south side of the Fitzalan Chapel

The Priory was run as a school by sisters of the (Catholic) Franciscan Order for the Duke of Norfolk; although it accepted young children from various backgrounds and economic circumstances, it also taught the dukes four daughters during the late 1940s and early 1950s. Classes were held in a large room on the first floor. There were never more than 28 pupils at one time. Gymnastics classes were taken outside the priory grounds, as the nuns were not equipped to manage that aspect of the curriculum, a male teacher came in to take these classes. The children walked through a gate into the grounds of the castle, to a ground floor room off the castle courtyard. Classes were held there weekly, and on one or two very rare occasions in summer children were permitted to swim in the Duke's swimming pool, or to play ball games on the Duke's famous cricket pitch in the castle park.

Between c. 1961 and 1974 the college buildings were used as a children's home with 30 residents, and after 1976 the south range and part of the east range were converted as a care home and the north-east corner was divided into flats for the elderly, both run by the Order of Knights of Malta Homes Trust; and today by its successor charity, the Order of St John Care Trust. There is also a small, successful amateur theatre located next to the care home which is run by the Arundel Players. They produce a mixture of 6 plays and musicals a year.
