= Arundel Town Hall =

Municipal building in Arundel, West Sussex, England

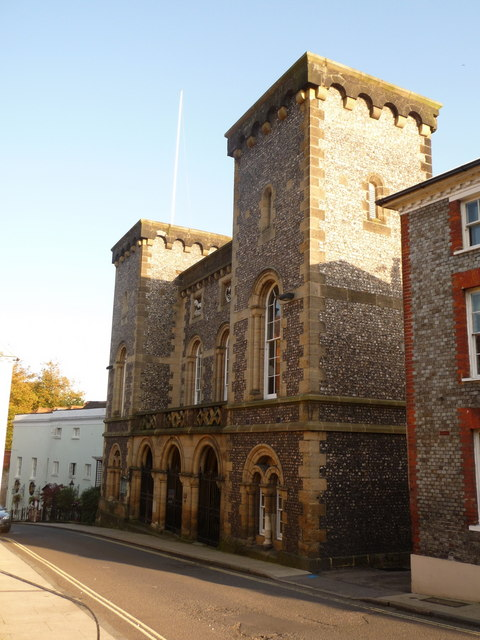
- Arundel Town Hall

- Shown in West Sussex
- 50.8549°N 0.5555°W
- Location: Maltravers Street, Arundel

History
- Built: 1838

Site notes
- Architect: Robert Abraham
- Architectural style: Norman style

Listed Building – Grade II
- Official name: Town Hall
- Designated: 5 June 1969
- Reference no.: 1027921

Arundel Town Hall is a municipal building in Maltravers Street in Arundel, West Sussex, England. The building, which is the meeting place of Arundel Town Council, is a Grade II listed building.

== History ==
The first town hall in Arundel was located in the middle of High Street near the junction with Tarrant Street and dated back at least to the mid-16th century. After it became dilapidated, it was demolished in around 1741.

In the early 1830s, the mayor, Arthur Atherley, facilitated an arrangement whereby Bernard Howard, 12th Duke of Norfolk would commission a new town hall for the borough in return for the borough giving up its interest in the Fitzalan Chapel, which formed the chancel of the Church of St Nicholas in the western grounds of Arundel Castle. The new building was designed by Robert Abraham in the Norman style, built in knapped flint with galleting and ashlar finishings and was opened in time for a civic meeting in March 1838.

The design involved a symmetrical main frontage with five bays facing onto Maltravers Street with the end bays slightly projected forward and structured as towers. The central section of three bays was formed a loggia with a parapet on the ground floor; on the first floor, the central section was deeply recessed, fenestrated by round headed windows which were flanked by columns supporting architraves, and decorated with panels above the windows containing carvings. The towers were fenestrated by two-partite round headed windows on the ground floor, by single round headed windows on the first floor and by lancet windows on the second floor. Internally, the principal room was the assembly room, which was on the first floor and became known as the Atherley Chamber after the former mayor: there was a lock-up for petty criminals as well as storage space for the horse-drawn fire engine in the basement.

In the mid-19th century, the town hall was occasionally used as a theatre and actors who performed there included the Shakespearean player, Ira Aldridge, in January 1847. Then, in 1861, the local member of parliament, Edward Fitzalan-Howard, paid for a gas chandelier for the assembly room.

In October 1921, the town hall was the venue for the trial of Edith Swan in the Littlehampton libels case: Swan was eventually found guilty of sending poisonous letters, but not before another person, Rose Gooding, had twice been sent to prison for crimes for which she was entirely innocent. In 1957, Lillian May Holmes donated money to create the Holmes Chamber, in memory of her late husband, Arthur Holmes, who had served as town clerk. The Arundel Museum was established in the basement of the town hall in 1964 and remained there until it relocated to the former borough council offices at 61 High Street some 13 years later.

The building continued to serve as a civic meeting place for Arundel Borough Council for much of the 20th century but ceased to be the local seat of government when the enlarged Arun District Council was formed in 1974. Instead it became the meeting place of Arundel Town Council. Magistrates' court hearings continued to take place in the building until the courts service relocated in December 2001. Works of art in the town hall include a portrait of Henry Fitzalan-Howard, 15th Duke of Norfolk.
