= Arundel Museum =

Local museum in Arundel, England

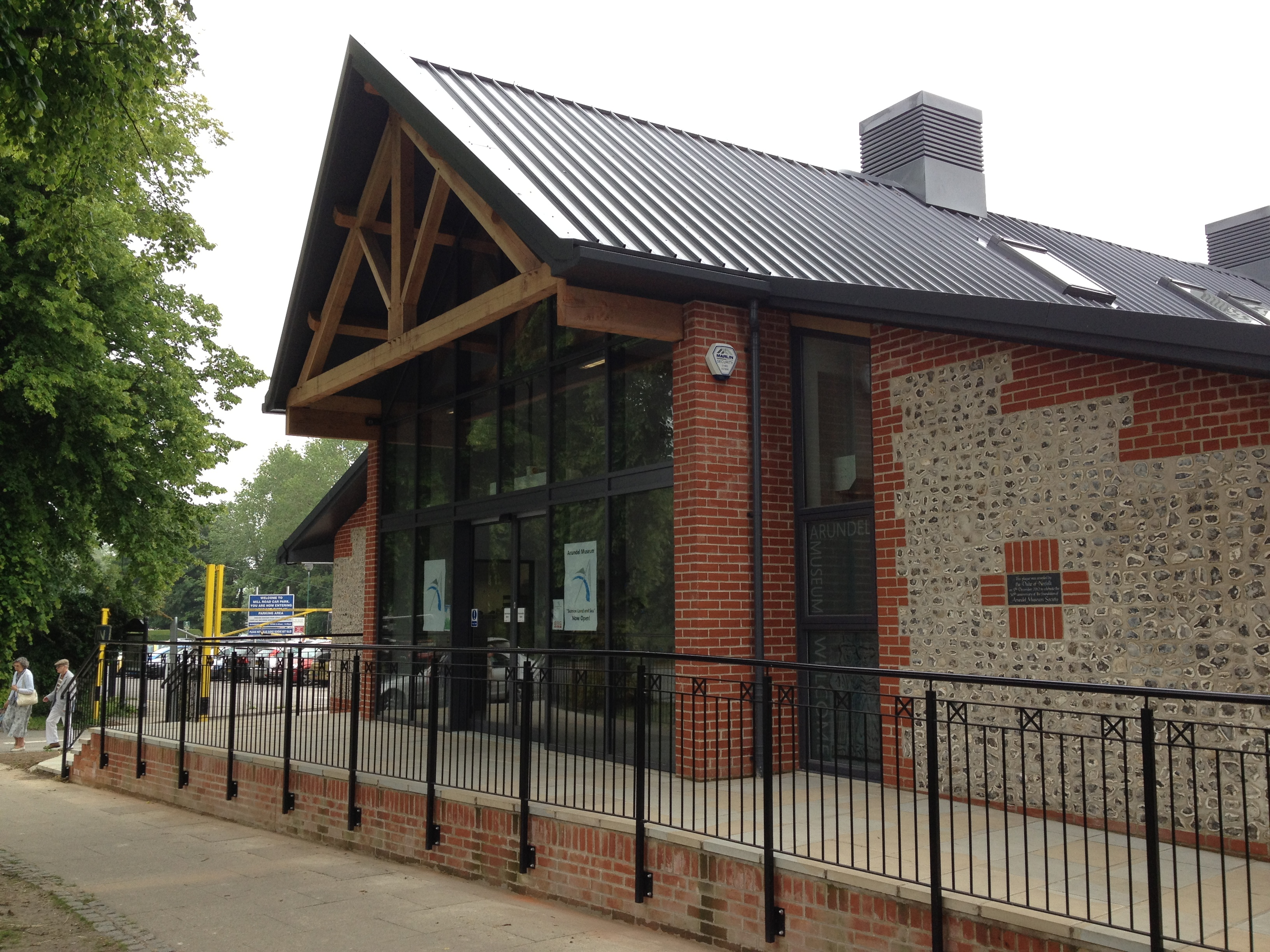
- Arundel Museum

- Location of the museum in Arundel
- Established: 1964
- Location: Mill Road, Arundel, West Sussex
- Coordinates: 50.854214°N 0.552160°W
- Type: Archaeology, Social History and Geology
- Website: http://www.arundelmuseum.org

Arundel Museum is a local museum in the town of Arundel, West Sussex, just inland from the south coast of England. Arundel Museum is run by the Arundel Museum Society, a registered charity. The museum is staffed by volunteers and relies on subscriptions, donations and fundraising events for its survival.

== History ==
=== Foundation in the Undercroft ===
Arundel Museum Society was founded in 1963 by a group of local people. At this time heritage was under threat from new development and was generally undervalued. The Museum Society set out to rescue and conserve as much as possible of Arundel's past, and aimed to create a town museum with the advice of Sussex historian Roy Armstrong and archaeologist Con Ainsworth.

In March 1964, the first museum was established in the old prison cells in the undercroft of Arundel Town Hall. In this evocative but somewhat cramped and damp environment the Museum Society built up displays of the history of Arundel and the surrounding villages. From the beginning, the museum relied totally on volunteer management and stewards. It was a small-scale attraction, and one of the first independent local museums in the area, but it had limitations.

=== The High Street Years ===
The Museum's first big opportunity came in 1975 when the former Borough Council Offices at 61 High Street became redundant following the major local government re-organisation. Arun District Council offered the Museum Society the opportunity to take a lease on this Grade II* listed Georgian building. The Society created a new museum which was opened in 1977. At this time AMS became a Charity (No 273790).

During the 1980s and 1990s, Arundel Museum Society faced new challenges. Standards of curatorial care became more demanding. Techniques of conservation were more complex and scientific. With a new national structure for the management of museums and galleries came the requirement for museums to be registered to show that they conformed to minimum standards of good curatorial practice. Arundel Museum was the first in the area to achieve MLA Registration.

The Museum expanded into eight galleries. In 2000, the oral history archive gathered by volunteers was published as a book entitled Arundel Voices. A grant was obtained for a new display on the Port of Arundel, and this was accompanied by a new Town Trail way-marked by ceramic plaques by a local potter. In 2004, an art gallery was established to stage exhibitions. A regular programme of town walks, lectures and short courses was offered, and school visits were hosted. In 2005, a new formal MLA requirement, Accreditation, was introduced with more demanding benchmarks and the need for extensive documentation and policies to meet specified formats. Arundel Museum was again one of the first in the area to achieve Accreditation, which it did at the first attempt.

=== An Uncertain Future ===
From 2000 onward, the Museum had operated under the shadow of an uncertain future. Arun District Council had expressed an intention to sell 61 High Street, and the lease would not be renewed. AMS tried hard to find alternative premises so that a planned move from one building to another might be achieved, however without success. Whilst efforts to develop a new museum carried on in the background, AMS was obliged to leave their premises in the autumn of 2007. Museum Society volunteers, supervised by a consultant curator, undertook the task of packing every item in the collection and transferring these into stores.

For the 2008 and subsequent seasons, Arundel Museum was able to keep a presence in the town by opening in temporary portacabin accommodation, sponsored by local entrepreneurs, next to the Car Park in Mill Road. In October 2011, it moved again, and again to temporary accommodation, this time in Crown Yard Mews, where the museum took on the role as tourist information point for Arundel.

=== Rescue ===
Returning to 2008, the Angmering Park Estate Trust and the Norfolk Estate came to the rescue and provided the society with a vision for the future. They agreed to jointly offer an ideal, prime site for a new building in the centre of the main tourist area. This is the site at that time occupied by St Nicholas Hall, opposite the Lower Castle Gate.

So AMS became involved in a two-pronged attack to achieve its aims.

- Firstly, Arundel Museum Society needed plans for the new building. Graham Whitehouse, the architect, created plans for the building and steered the society through the planning process. Jonothan Potter worked closely with the museum to develop a new design concept for the internal displays.
- Secondly, Arundel Museum Society needed to embark on a major fundraising drive to raise a total of £1.6 million to build and fit out its new permanent home in the heart of Arundel. The first step was to apply for funding from the National Lottery Heritage Fund, formerly Heritage Lottery Fund (HLF).

Planning consent was obtained in March 2009. Early in 2010, the news was received that the first round bid that the Society had made to the HLF had been successful. This meant that the HLF awarded the Society a grant of £102,800 to develop and submit more detailed development plans and apply for up to a further £888,000. The second round bid was submitted to the HLF in November.

At the end of March 2011, the Society heard that the second round application to the Heritage Lottery Fund for £888,000 had been granted, subject to contract, towards the project totaling £1,414,500. This grant, together with a £385,500 from Arun District Council, £50,000 that was raised locally last year, and funding from other sources, has provided sufficient funding for the building to go ahead.

Construction of the new museum began early in 2012, with the demolition of St Nicholas Hall in February. Next there was an archaeological investigation and building began shortly after the investigation completed and its results were known.

=== The new museum ===
The new museum, adjacent to the river, and opposite the Lower Castle Gate, was opened by the Duke of Norfolk on 24 June 2013.

== See also ==
- Amberley Museum & Heritage Centre
- Arundel Castle
