= Arundel =

Market town in West Sussex, England

Coordinates: 50.85439°N 0.5539°W

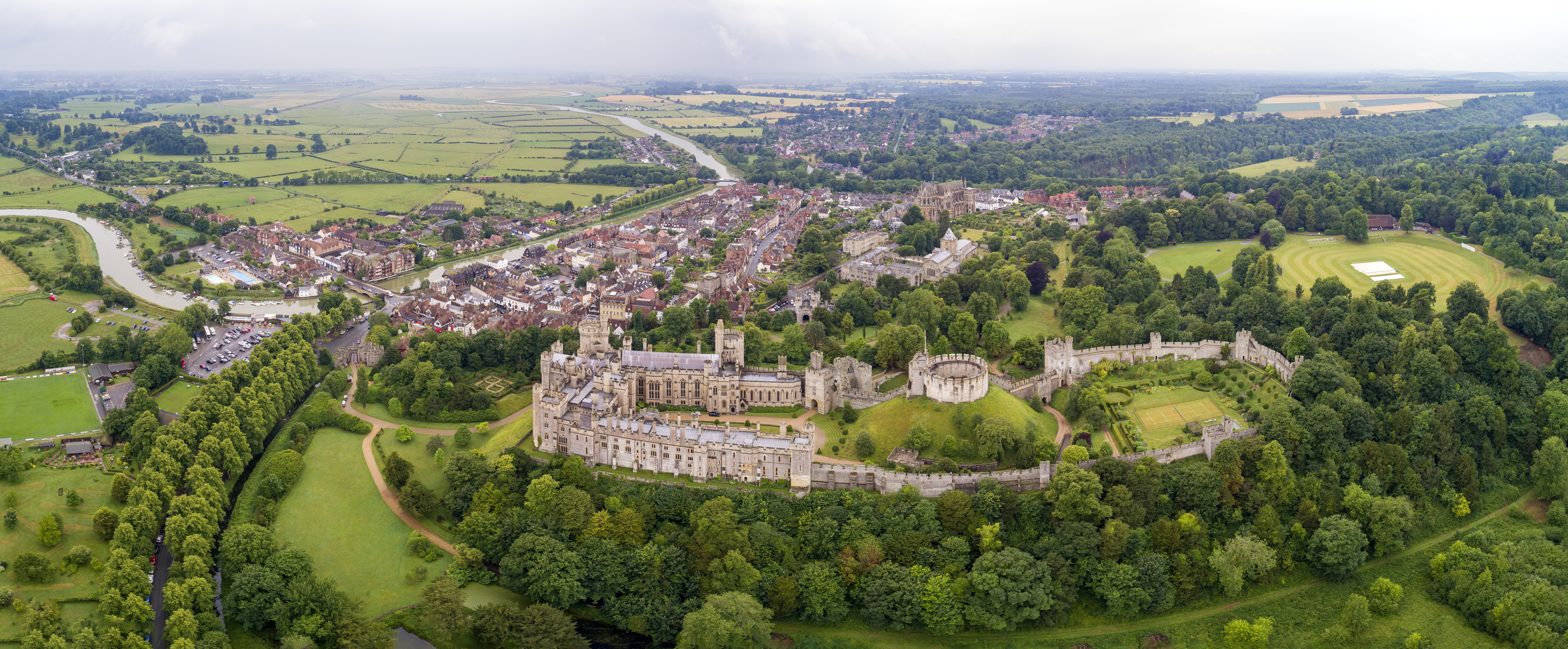
- Arundel Castle overlooking the town

- Location within West Sussex
- Area: 12.13 km^{2} (4.68 sq mi)
- Population: 3,475 (civil parish, 2011)
  - Density: 286/km^{2} (740/sq mi)
- OS grid reference: TQ018070
  - London: 49 miles (79 km) NNE
- Civil parish: Arundel
- District: Arun
- Shire county: West Sussex
- Region: South East
- Country: England
- Sovereign state: United Kingdom
- Post town: ARUNDEL
- Postcode district: BN18
- Dialling code: 01903
- Police: Sussex
- Fire: West Sussex
- Ambulance: South East Coast
- UK Parliament: Arundel and South Downs

Arundel (/ˈærəndəl/ ARR-ən-dəl) is a market town and civil parish in the Arun District of the South Downs, West Sussex, England.

The much-conserved town has a medieval castle and Roman Catholic cathedral. Arundel has a museum and comes second behind much larger Chichester in its number of listed buildings in West Sussex. The River Arun runs through the eastern side of the town.

The Arundel electoral borough was one of many reformed by the Municipal Reform Act 1835.

From 1836 to 1889 the town had its own Borough police force with a strength of three. In 1974 it became part of the Arun district, and is now a civil parish with a town council.

== Name ==
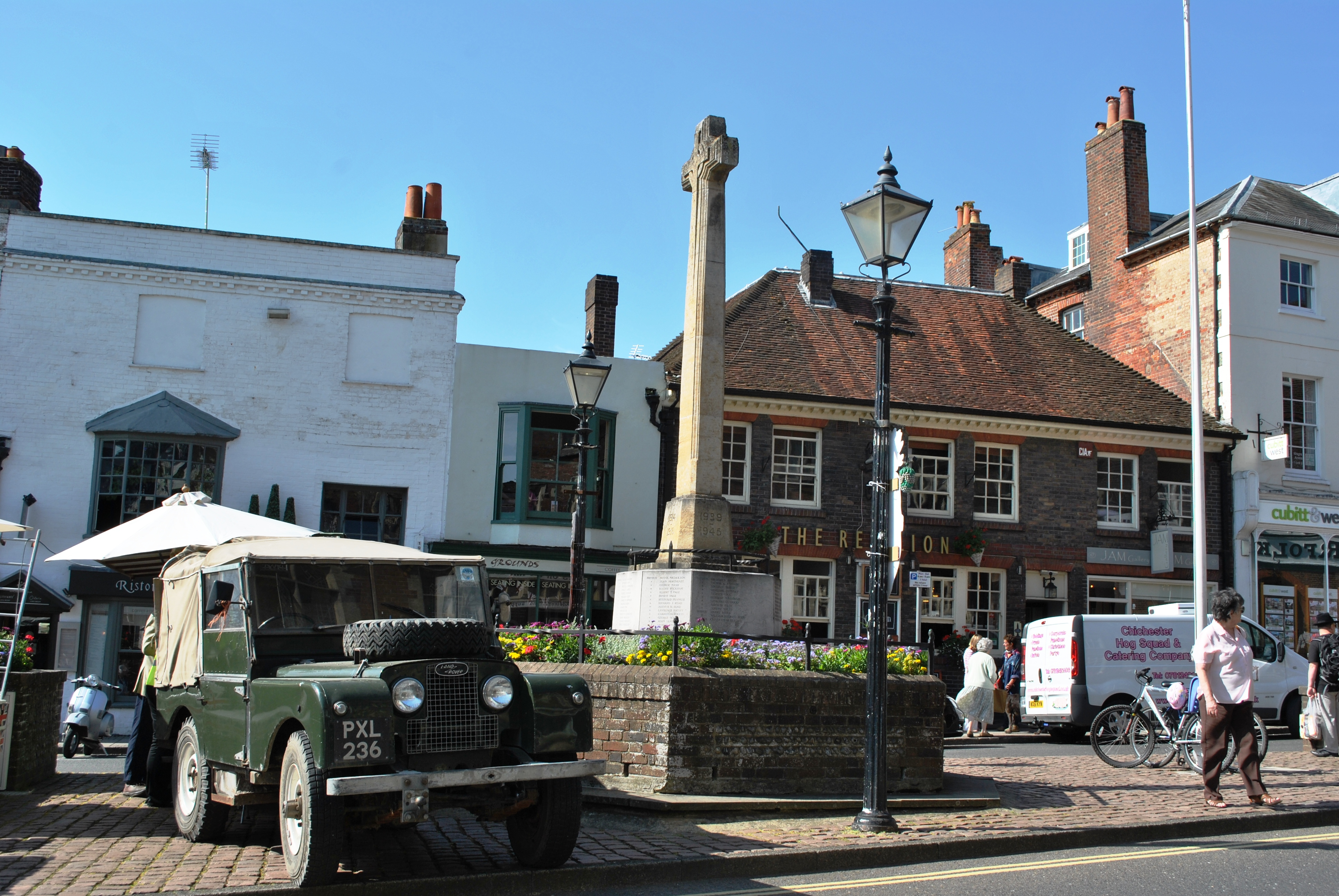
Arundel's old marketplace

The name comes from the Old English Hārhūnedell, meaning 'valley of horehound', and was first recorded in the Domesday Book. Folk etymology, however, connects the name with the Old French word arondelle, meaning 'swallow', and swallows appear on the town's arms.

== Governance ==
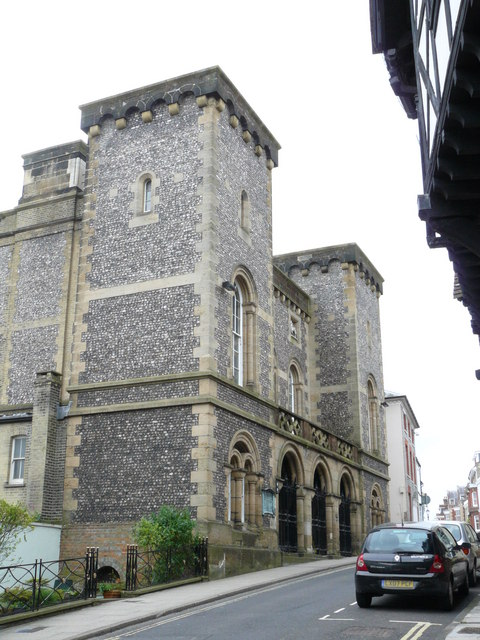
Arundel Town Hall

An electoral ward of the same name exists. This ward stretches north to Houghton with a total population at the 2011 census of 4,298. Arundel Town Council is based at Arundel Town Hall.

== Geography ==
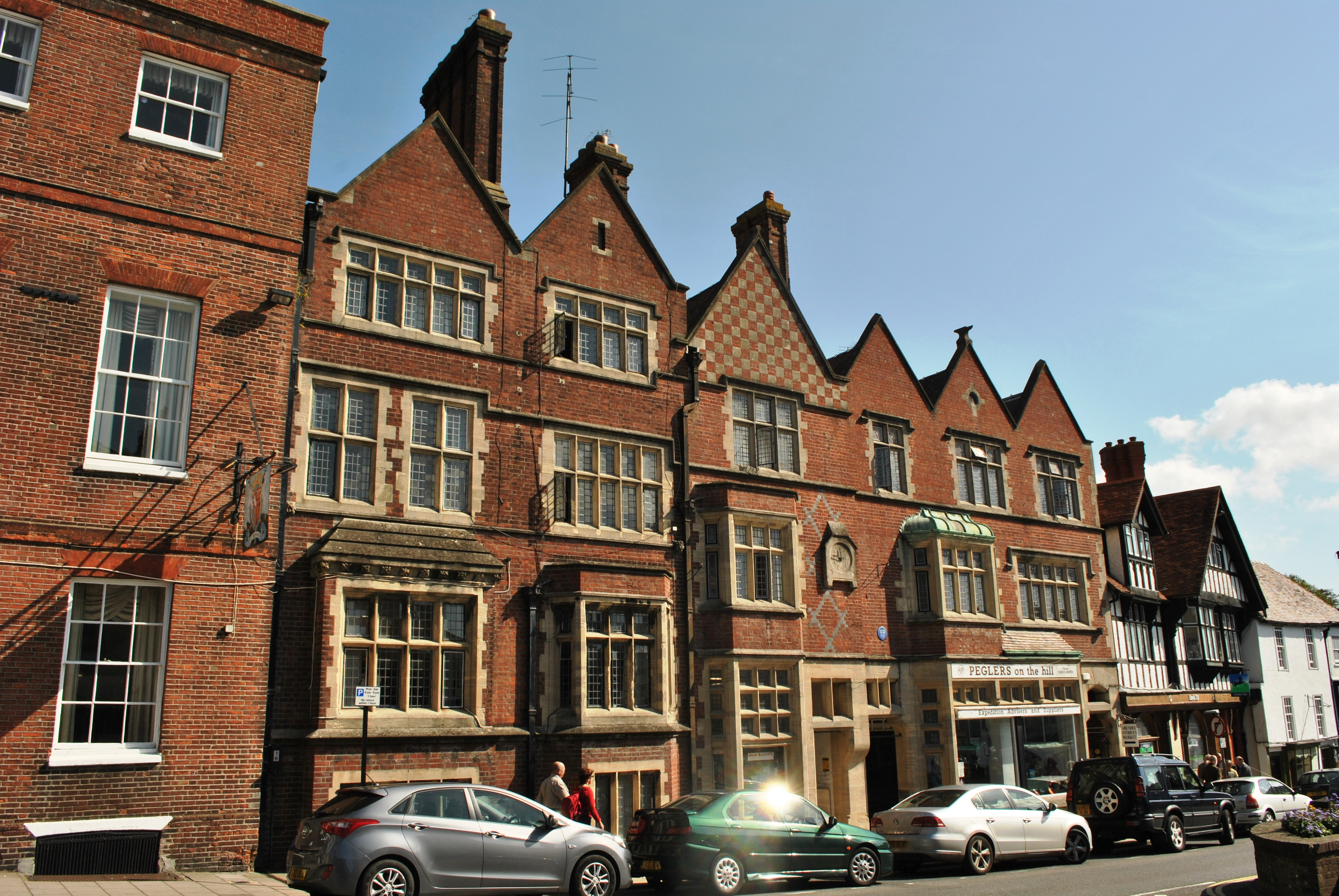
Arundel's old town main street

Arundel civil parish occupies an area somewhat larger than its built-up clusters, with the old town towards the north and the new to the south, separated by a main road.

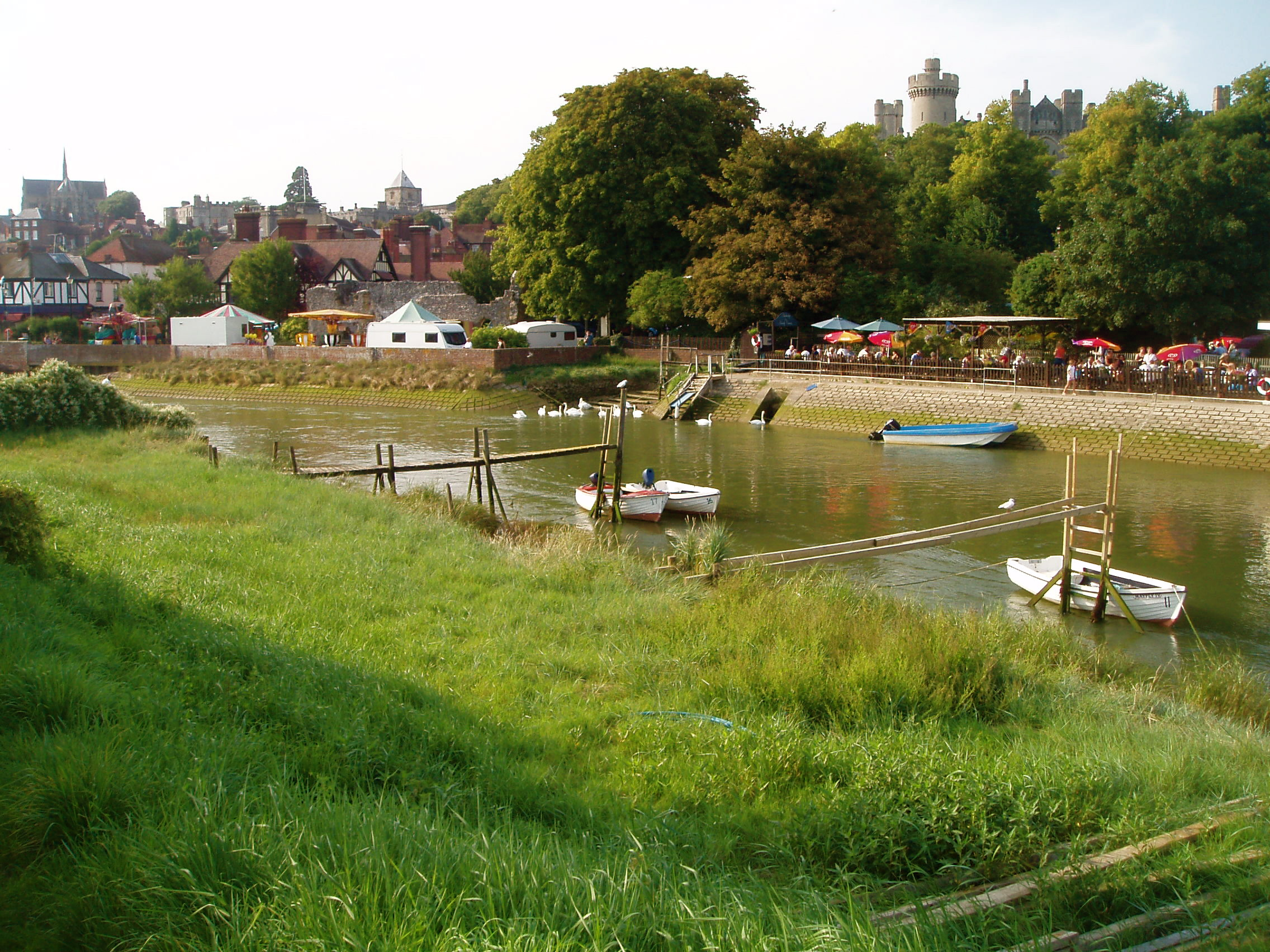
The River Arun at Arundel.

Arundel town is a major bridging point over the River Arun as it was the lowest road bridge until the opening of the Littlehampton swing bridge in 1908. Arundel Castle was built by the Normans to protect that vulnerable fairly wooded plain to the north of the valley through the South Downs. The town later grew up on the slope below the castle to the south. The river was previously called the Tarrant and was renamed after the town by antiquarians in a back-formation.

Arundel includes meadows to the south but is clustered north of the A27 road, which narrowly avoids the town centre by a short and congested single carriageway bypass. Plans for a more extensive, high-quality dual carriageway bypass were debated intensely between 1980 and 2010 and a junction was built for it at Crossbush. In 2018 Highways England published their preferred route for the new bypass. During 2018–19 there was a further period of consultation when views on a more detailed design for the four-mile (six-kilometre) dual carriageway were sought.

Arundel railway station is on the Arun Valley Line. The Monarch's Way long-distance footpath passes through the town and crosses the river here, while just under five miles (eight kilometres) north and northwest of the town the route of the South Downs Way runs.

The town itself lies outside the boundaries of the South Downs National Park.

== Society ==
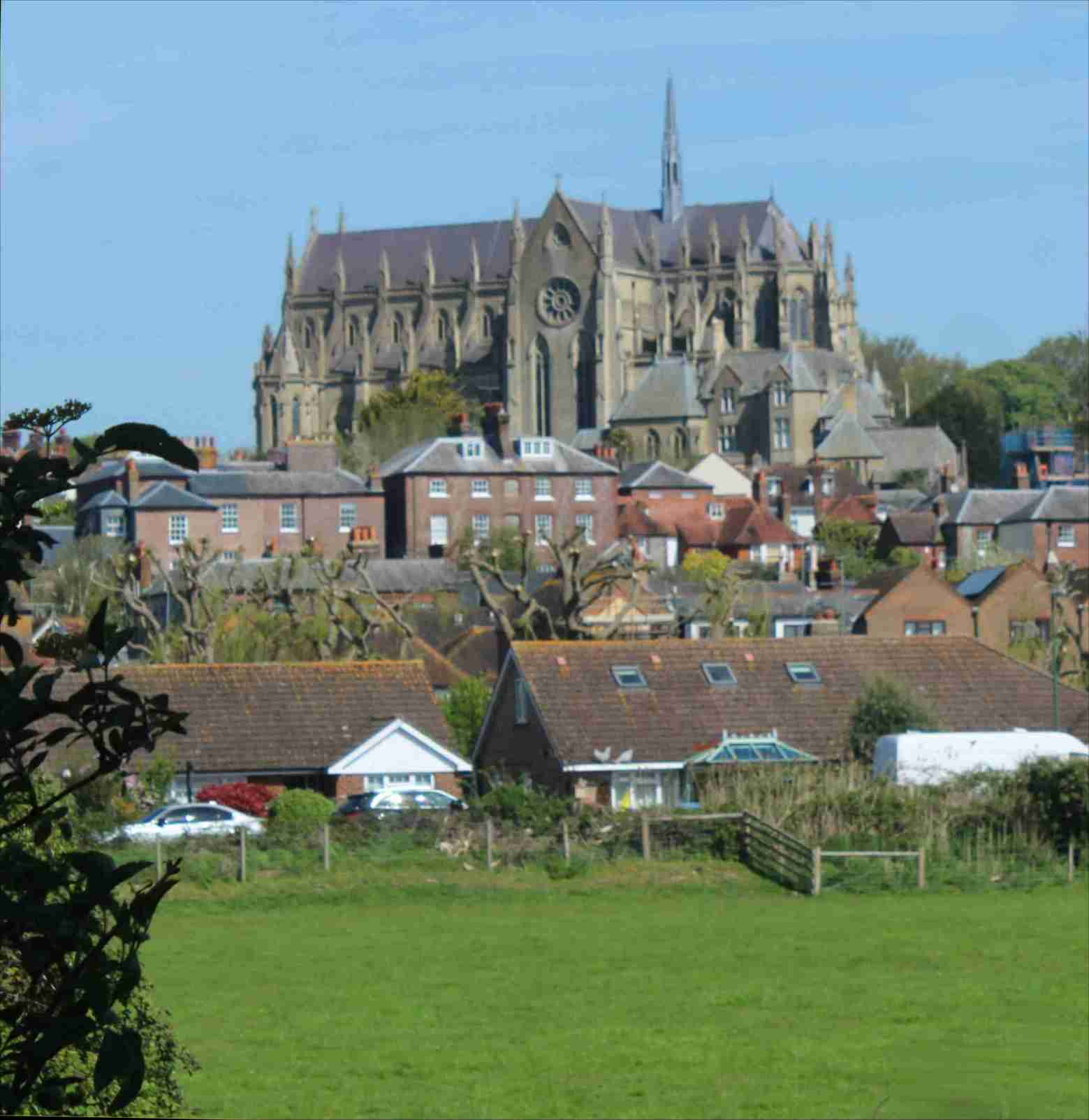
Arundel cathedral from the South

Arundel is home to Arundel Castle, seat of the Duke of Norfolk; and to Arundel Cathedral, seat of the (Catholic) Bishop of Arundel and Brighton.

On 6 July 2004, Arundel was granted Fairtrade Town status.

People born in Arundel are known locally as Mullets, due to the presence of mullet in the River Arun.

Arundel is home to one of the oldest Scout Groups in the world. 1st Arundel (Earl of Arundel's Own) Scout Group was formed in 1908 only a few weeks after Scouting began. Based in an HQ in Green Lane Close, it has active sections of Beaver Scouts, Cub Scouts and Scouts.

== Sport and leisure ==
Arundel has a non-League football club Arundel F.C. which plays at Mill Road.

The town also has its own cricket ground at the castle, often cited as being one of the country's most picturesque. It hosts Sussex County Cricket Club for a number of games each season.

== Notable people ==
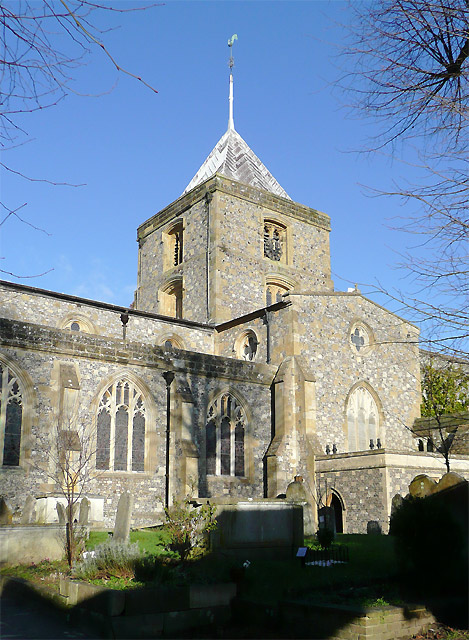
The Church of St Nicholas, Arundel

- Christopher Alexander, architect.
- Eluned Allen-Williams, Girl Guide executive, in 1975 became the first woman to hold position of chair on the Arundel bench
- Mary Chater, composer, Music Advisor to the Girl Guides and Justice of the Peace for Arundel from 1945 to 1961.
- Derek Davis, potter and painter.
- Judy Geeson, actress.
- St Philip Howard, 13th Earl of Arundel, part of the court of Queen Elizabeth I and a martyr for the Catholic faith.
- Amelia Frances Howard-Gibbon, teacher and artist, was born in nearby Littlehampton and lived in Arundel as a child.
- C. E. M. Joad, philosopher and broadcaster, wrote many books at South Stoke Farm near Arundel.
- George MacDonald, pastor of Trinity Congregational Church, 1850.
- Liam Treadwell, jockey.

== See also ==
- Amberley Working Museum
- An Arundel Tomb, a poem by Philip Larkin
- Arundel Museum
- Earls of Arundel
  - Roger de Montgomery (died 1094), also known as Roger the Great de Montgomery
- Fitzalan Chapel
- List of places of worship in Arun
- Listed buildings in Arundel
- Portsmouth and Arundel Canal
- South Marsh Mill, Arundel
- Sussex in the High Middle Ages
- Tortington
- WWT Arundel
