= Emily Cockayne =

British historian

- Born: 1973 (age 52–53)
- Education: Jesus College, University of Cambridge
- Occupation: Historian
- Employer(s): Open University; University of East Anglia
- Notable work: Hubbub. Filth, Noise & Stench in England 1600–1770 (2007)
- Children: 2

Emily Cockayne (born 1973) is a British historian, known for her work on sensory nuisance and material culture.

== Education ==
Cockayne was educated at the University of Cambridge, where she took a first class degree in history in 1994. She received the Members' History Prize in 1997. She wrote a doctoral thesis at Jesus College, Cambridge, under the supervision of Robert W. Scribner and Keith Wrightson, and was awarded her PhD in 2000. She was a Prize Fellow of Magdalen College, Oxford, and afterwards lectured at the Open University. She is currently Associate Professor in Early Modern History at the University of East Anglia.

== Career ==
In 2007, Cockayne published Hubbub. Filth, Noise & Stench in England 1600–1770. A reviewer in The Independent commented: 'Cockayne draws us into a world where snickleways (narrow, often noisome passages) might be contaminated by fallen axunge (pig fat used to grease axles) or the overflow from a "house of easement"'. The book has been described as 'a treasure-house of material for scholars'. Toni Morrison said Hubbub was 'a really extraordinary book', and that it had influenced her 2008 novel A Mercy. Hubbub is often included in academic bibliographies of seminal works in modern urban history and the history of everyday life. A second edition of Hubbub was issued in 2021 with a new afterword.

Cheek by Jowl. A History of Neighbours followed in 2012. A reviewer in Literary Review described Cheek by Jowl as 'authoritative if heavy-going'; while The Daily Telegraph noted that 'Cockayne does not marshal her subject particularly linearly ... [but] crisply accounts for our disappearing notion of neighbourliness'.

In 2020, Cockayne published a history of recycling and material reuse entitled Rummage. The Guardian hailed Rummage as 'brilliantly original and deeply-researched', while The Sunday Times called it 'rich and meticulous'.

In addition to her academic work, which has included contributions to the history of Magdalen College, Oxford, and essays on noise and deafness in Urban History and The Historical Journal respectively, Cockayne has written for The Architectural Review; The Daily Telegraph; The Times; Times Literary Supplement; and The Wall Street Journal. She has appeared on BBC Radio 4 programmes Thinking Allowed and Woman's Hour; BBC Radio 3's The Listening Service; and in international broadcasts.

Cockayne's study of anonymous letter-writing, Penning Poison: A History of Anonymous Letters, was published by Oxford University Press in 2023.

== Personal life ==
Cockayne lives in East Anglia. She has two children, Ned and Maud.

== Books ==
- Hubbub. Filth, Noise & Stench in England 1600-1770 (Yale University Press, 2007). ISBN 9780300112146
- Cheek by Jowl. A History of Neighbours (Bodley Head, 2012). ISBN 9781409027737
- Rummage. A History of the Things We Have Reused, Recycled and Refused to Let Go (Profile, 2020). ISBN 9781781258514
- Penning Poison: A History of Anonymous Letters (OUP Oxford, 2023). ISBN 9780198795056
