= East Preston Cricket Club =

East Preston Cricket Club is a well-established cricket club based in East Preston, West Sussex, England. They were founded in 1860.

== History ==
East Preston Cricket Club (EPCC) was founded in 1860. In 1989 it was elected to the Sussex Invitation Cricket League and has experienced mixed success. The club's best performance to date was finishing 6th in the top division. In 1996 they were relegated to Division 2 but succeeded in gaining promotion back to Division 1 the following season. The club now plays in the newly extended West Sussex Invitation Cricket League.

One of the most notable points in the club's history was their reluctance to permit people who lived or worked outside the village to become a member. This policy had little effect on their success however as they finished runners-up in the Sussex Championship League in 1981, won the Worthing & District KO in 1974, and finished runners-up in the same competition in 1975 and 1982. The second team also enjoyed good success winning the Clymping KO in 1969, 1972 and 1973 and the Clymping Plate in 1981, 1989 and 1996.

Over the years the club has enjoyed connections with some famous cricketers. Garfield Sobers and Tony Greig have made appearances in charity games and Sussex cricketer Ken Suttle played for the club for several seasons in the 1990s.

The club plays its home games on its small ground situated at the heart of the village. The size of the ground has caused issues with several neighbours over the years.
