= Shelvock =

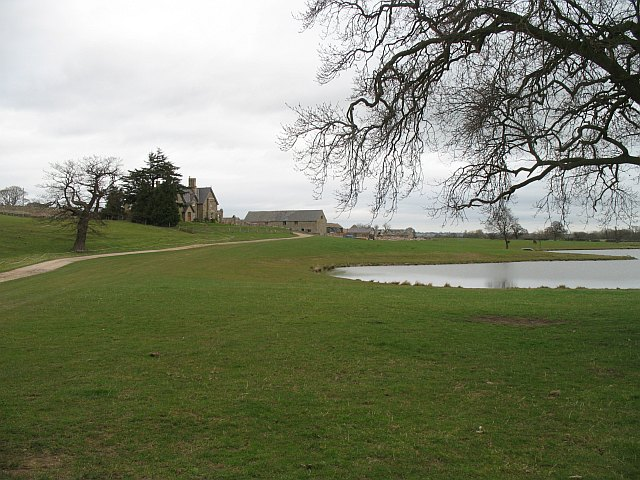
Small lake in the old township of Shelvock

Shelvock is a name of Saxon origins - from the Old English scelf meaning a shelf of level ground, or flat topped hill, and ac meaning oak, taken from the ancient Manor of Shelvock, near Ruyton-XI-Towns, Shropshire, England originally pronounced "shelf'ac", "shelv'ak" or "shelv'oak", but today as "shel'vock". All families with this name (and associated variants Shilvock & Shelvoke) are believed to be given to tenant-farmers and servants attached to the manor.

Shelvock is also a type of freestone quarried on the property, a Permian sandstone, known to be used in the building of Grimpo Congregational Chapel, 3 km north of Shelvock.

== Manor of Shelvock ==
In the Domesday period (1086) Shelvock was one of the three Berewicks (a hamlet attached to a manor) of the Manor of Wykey. Sometime between the Domesday Book and 1175 Shelvock became the head of the manor.

The first recorded spelling of Shelvock was Shelfhoc (1175), and later Sselvak and Schelfac (c. 1270). From the 15th century and for several centuries Shelvock was the seat of the Thornes family, before its decline in the 18th century and beyond. In the 1890s, then a farm house in the Parish of Ruyton-XI-Towns (Ruyton-of-the-Eleven-Towns, or simply Ruyton), Shelvock was part of the Tedsmore Hall property. In 1894 the township of Shelvock included the house and one cottage. In the 21st century only the working farm remains.

Detailed History of Shelvock Manor

== Family names ==
Shelvock is the original family name of Shropshire origins. Shilvock - pronounced shil'vok - the variant created in the 17th or 18th century by Black Country (North Worcestershire/South Staffordshire) dialect and is the dominant family name and spelling today. After US immigration some Shilvock families reverted to the name Shelvock. Both family names can be found in Central England, the US, Canada, Australia and New Zealand.

Shelvoke is a variant (occasionally Shelvoak). Extinct as a family name (since the 1960s), the name survives only in a small number of UK engineering firms, the most notable of which are Accles & Shelvoke and Shelvoke and Drewry, which the latter became incorporated into Shelvoke Dempster, Dennis Shelvoke, and other spin-off companies. The name also exists in a firm of accountants based in Cannock, Staffordshire.

Noted people with the name include:

- Captain George Shelvocke, 18th-century privateer and author
- George Shelvocke, son of Captain George Shelvocke, a member of the crew and later secretary general of the Post Office in London
