= Harry Shelvoke =

Harry Shelvoke (1877–1962) was one of the founding members of the British coachbuilding and engineering company Shelvoke and Drewry.

He was one of the last members to bear a family name that is documented to have become extinct in modern times (the last male died in 1985). The name lives on in three company names connected to Harry's family: the engineering firm of Accles & Shelvoke Ltd in Sutton Coldfield; Shelvoke, Pickering, Janney LLP, a firm of chartered accountants in Cannock, Staffordshire; and Shelvokes Financial Services Ltd at the same address.

Harry Shelvoke was born in Aston, Birmingham, and lived in Handsworth for about 30 years. He married Minnie Sinigar (another surname now extinct in Britain) (1877–1937) in 1901. After she died, and now living in Letchworth, Hertfordshire, he married Gilberte Beeckman (1903–1970) in 1940. He died childless in 1962 in Suffolk, aged 84.

== Work ==
The Lacre Motor Car Company Ltd was an important early commercial vehicle manufacturer. Lacre was a contraction of Long Acre, London, where the business started in 1902. It moved to the expanding Letchworth Garden City in 1910. In 1911 Harry joined it as general manager. James Drewry (1882–1952) was chief engineer. Together they conceived a design for an ingenious lorry, called the "Freighter", and built the prototype in Harry's barn. Since Lacre were not interested in producing this vehicle, they left to form Shelvoke and Drewry in 1922, with 30 employees. In 1937 it became a public company, with Harry Shelvoke as managing director. He was chairman of the company from 1949 to 1957. During this time, the company made buses, refuse collection vehicles and fork lift trucks, as well as trailers, miniature submarines and other items for the Second World War. Shelvoke and Drewry later became incorporated into Shelvoke Dempster, Dennis Shelvoke, and other spin-off companies.

== Related companies ==
The firm of Accles & Shelvoke was formed in 1913 by J G Accles and G E Shelvoke (Harry's brother), to commence the manufacture of cartridge-powered captive bolt stunning equipment, becoming, and still remaining, a world leader in humane animal killing. This resulted from a history of manufacturing and engineering by the Shelvokes, which includes:

- 1876: James Shelvoke, Weaver; mail maker at Talford Street Works in Aston (Hulley's Directory).
- 1890: George & James Shelvoke, Weavers; mail makers at Talford Street (Kelley's Directory).
- 1896: C. Shelvoke & Co. was making pins, rings and chains at Talford Street (Peck's Circular).
- 1896: James Shelvoke was making cycle chains, rivets, washers, and weavers' mails at Alma Street, Aston (Peck's Circular).

The accountancy firm Shelvoke Pickering and Janney was established in Birmingham by Charles Hamilton Shelvoke, Harry's nephew, in about 1930. The Birmingham office was closed after a takeover, but the Cannock branch survives.

== Private life ==
His home in Pixmore Way, Letchworth, was a mock-Tudor house built for him, named Melverley, where he lived until his death, surrounded by armour and swords. Similarly, the boardroom at the works, in Icknield Way, was wood panelled to resemble a baronial hall. Mr. Shelvoke apparently drove the ex-Prince of Wales' Daimler Double Six motor car. He is represented as "a fearsome gentleman of the old school, with a flair for showmanship. He expected high standards from his employees, but many remained loyal to the company over many years."

Harry usurped the coat of arms of the Thornes family of Shelvock and Melverley in Shropshire. He also celebrated his supposed family connection to the Shropshire privateer and pirate George Shelvocke (c. 1675-1742), who inspired Coleridge's The Rime of the Ancient Mariner poem.

== Ancestry and loss of surname ==
He is descended from those associated with Shelvock Manor in Shropshire and families bearing the name of Shelvock. Historical records show that the spelling variant of Shelvoke is first recorded in 1722 at Eccleshall in Staffordshire, NW of Stafford, before recurring in the 19th-century industrialised West Midlands towns of Wolverhampton and Willenhall, probable ancestors of Harry.

James Shelvoke (originally Shilvock), Harry's grandfather, (born by 1814, location unknown) headed the family centred in nearby West Bromwich and Aston, part of Birmingham. James married Catharine Harper in Aston in 1833. They had three children:

- James (c. 1834–1922/23; m. 1854 Sarah Rooke (1834–1875/76); children: Mary Ann (1857), Elizabeth (1859–1951), Florence (1867–1917/18), & Kate (1870–1939/40)) - a long-extinct line.
- George (1836–1906/07; m. 1862 Emma Showell (1844–1920/21); children: Annie (1868), Charles (1870–1945), George Edwin (1874–1962), & Harry (1877–1962)). They were living in Trinity Road, Handsworth in 1881 and Shenstone in 1901. Emma died at Kingsbury Road, Birmingham.
- Mary Ann (1837).

George Edwin Shelvoke, Harry's brother, married Charlotte Theodora Feeney (1873–1934), and had Gwyneth Grace (1899–1966, born in Cape Colony, South Africa), and William George (1907–1985, m. 1968 Edythe Diana Thorpe (born 1920)). In 1935, after Charlotte's death, he married May Wilhelmine Turner (1907–1991).

Harry Shelvoke had a second cousin named Harry Clifford Shelvoke (1874–1927), who became a part of two families that settled in the Croydon area, south of London, in the early 20th century. Harry C's father was also Harry (born Henry) (1848/49–1929), and moved to Croydon. Harry C married there in 1902 and had three daughters: (Dorothy Edna (1903), Lilian Brenda (1906), and Eileen Norah (1908/09)). These girls married in 1929, 1931 and 1937 respectively, which ended the Shelvoke name for Harry C's line. His brother Frank also married in Croydon, in 1911, and had one daughter, Barbara Mary (1914–1996/97); she was the last Shelvoke born.

Another line of Shelvokes likewise died out in the Wolverhampton area in the 19th century.

Harry's nephews Charles Hamilton Shelvoke (1902–1955) and William George Shelvoke (1907–1985) produced no offspring. William died in Devon, leaving his widow as the sole surviving Shelvoke in name. Mrs Edythe Diana Shelvoke, born in 1920, died in 2019.

A genetic tendency towards more girls than boys, combined with several males having no children, are the causes of the rareness and then extinction of the family name. Since 1901, about 200,000 surnames have disappeared altogether from England and Wales, according to a study conducted by Ancestry.co.uk.
