= Listed buildings in Ruyton-XI-Towns =

Ruyton-XI-Towns is a civil parish in Shropshire, England. It contains 38 listed buildings that are recorded in the National Heritage List for England. Of these, three are listed at Grade II*, the middle of the three grades, and the others are at Grade II, the lowest grade. The parish contains the large village of Ruyton-XI-Towns and smaller settlements including Wykey, and is otherwise rural. The parish contains two country houses and other large houses that are listed, together with associated structures. Most of the other listed buildings are smaller houses, cottages, farmhouses and farm buildings, the earliest of which are timber framed or have timber-framed cores. The remainder include two churches, items in a churchyard, the remains of a castle, public houses, a cross, and a war memorial.

== Key ==
Grade	Criteria
II*	Particularly important buildings of more than special interest
II	Buildings of national importance and special interest

== Buildings ==
Name and location	Photograph	Date	Notes	Grade
St John the Baptist's Church; 52.79362°N 2.89888°W		12th century	The tower dates from the 15th century, the north aisle was enlarged in 1844–45, the church was restored in the 1860s by S. Pountney Smith, and the south porch was rebuilt in 1892. The church is in red sandstone with slate roofs, and consists of a nave, a north aisle, a south porch, a chancel with a north vestry and a west tower. The tower has two stages, diagonal buttresses, a stair turret at the southeast, a cornice with carved heads and corner gargoyles, an embattled parapet, and a pyramidal cap with a brass weathercock and a finial. The south doorway in the nave and the priest's door date from the 12th century.	II
Remains of Castle; 52.79359°N 2.89933°W	—	Early 14th century	The remains of the castle are in sandstone, and consist of parts of three walls of a former rectangular tower on a slightly raised platform, and there are the footings of another wall. The remains have a maximum height of 10 metres (33 ft), and are also a Scheduled Monument.	II
Ruyton Hall; 52.79454°N 2.90502°W	—	1574	The house was considerably remodelled and extended in the late 18th or early 19th century. It is in rendered brick, with a possible timber framed core, and has parapets, some with iron balustrades, and hipped and gabled slate roofs. There are two storeys, and a square plan with a north wing and a northeast service wing. The porch is gabled, and most of the windows are sashes.	II
Pinfold Cottage and Sycamore Cottage; 52.81869°N 2.90522°W	—	Late 16th century (probable)	A farmhouse, extended in the 17th century and later, and divided into two cottages. They are timber framed with brick infill and have a tile roof. There are two storeys, the windows are casements, there are three gabled eaves dormers, and two doorways with lean-to hoods.	II
Coton Farmhouse; 52.79133°N 2.92251°W	—	Early 17th century	The farmhouse was remodelled in the 18th century and in 1888. The early parts are timber framed with red brick infill, the extensions are in red brick, partly roughcast and partly clad in yellow brick, and the roof is slated and hipped to the east. In the angle at the rear is an outshut in sandstone and red brick. There are two storeys and an attic, and a basic T-shaped plan. In the centre is a gabled porch with a pointed arch, a datestone, and five grotesque heads in the tie beam. Flanking the porch are bay windows, and the other windows are sashes.	II
Smithy House; 52.79486°N 2.90374°W	—	Early 17th century	A farmhouse, later a private house, it was later extended. The early part is timber framed with rendered infill, the extensions are in brick painted to resemble timber framing, and the roof is slated. There are two storeys, five bays, and a rear outshut. In the centre is a two-storey gabled porch containing a doorway with a pediment. The windows are casements, and inside are two inglenook fireplaces.	II
Leaman House and Powys House; 52.79334°N 2.90094°W	—	17th century	A terrace of three houses mainly from the 18th century but with an earlier timber framed core. They are in red brick with a dentilled eaves cornice, the infill is also red brick, the gable ends are rendered, and the roof is slated. There are three storeys, and each house has two bays. The three doorways have pilasters and open pedimented hoods, the middle doorway has a rectangular fanlight, and the doorway on the right has a semicircular fanlight. The windows are sashes with stone wedge lintels.	II
Olde Farmhouse; 52.81928°N 2.93659°W	—	17th century (probable)	The farmhouse was later altered and extended. The early part is in pebbledashed timber framing, the later parts are in brick, and the roof is slated. There is one storey and an attic, and an L-shaped plan consisting of a hall range of 2½ bays, a cross-wing of two or three bays, and a short range parallel to the hall range in the front angle. The porch is gabled, the windows are casements, there is a gabled eaves dormer in the hall range, and a hipped roof dormer in the short range.	II
Garden wall, Eardiston House; 52.81899°N 2.93596°W	—	17th century	The wall, which encloses the garden of the house, is in limestone with ramped ashlar coping. At the northwest corner is a round-headed arch and a door.	II
Gamehouse or ash-house, Shelvock Farm; 52.81042°N 2.93460°W	—	Mid to late 17th century	The structure, the purpose of which is uncertain, is in sandstone on a chamfered plinth, with a moulded eaves cornice, and a polygonal slate roof and an iron weathervane. It has one storey, a polygonal plan, and contains a doorway and a window, each with a large stone lintel, and blocked vent holes.	II*
Stable, mixing-house, granary and cartshed, Shelvock Farm; 52.81038°N 2.93429°W	—	Mid to late 17th century	The range of farm buildings was extended in 1860. It is in sandstone, the earlier part on a plinth, with quoins and a slate roof. There are two levels, datestones, and various openings, including mullioned windows, fixed windows, eaves hatches, doorway and vehicle entrances with segmental heads.	II*
The Talbot Inn; 52.79400°N 2.90284°W		Late 17th century	A house, later a public house, it is timber framed with rendered infill on a rendered stone plinth, and has a slate roof. There are two storeys and an L-shaped plan, with a main range and a short rear wing. There are two doorways, the one to the right with a pedimented head, and the windows are casements.	II
The White House; 52.79274°N 2.89766°W	—	Late 17th century	A timber framed cottage with roughcast infill on a sandstone plinth, with sandstone blocks in the left gable end, and a slate roof. There are two storeys and two bays. The windows are casements, and the doorway to the left has a bracketed hood.	II
Lodge Farmhouse; 52.80236°N 2.90822°W	—	Late 17th to early 18th century (probable)	The farmhouse has been remodelled and extended. The early part is timber framed with red brick infill, the extensions are in red brick, and the roof is slated. There are two storeys and an attic. The original part has three bays and a gabled staircase projection, and the later range at right angles to the rear on the right is larger, and incorporates part of an earlier timber-framed range. There is a two-storey outshut in the angle. The windows are sashes, some with moulded surrounds, and the central doorway has a rectangular fanlight.	II
Former coach house, Ruyton Hall; 52.79444°N 2.90452°W	—	1705	The coach house, later used for other purposes, is in red brick with a slate roof. There is one storey and an attic, and a T-shaped plan, consisting of a main range and lower rear ranges. In the centre is a pediment and a former archway replaced by double doors. In the ground floor are cross-windows, above the archway is a datestone and a semicircular window, and flanking these are gabled eaves dormers.	II
Sundial; 52.79350°N 2.89906°W	—	1725	The sundial is in the churchyard of St John the Baptist's Church. It is in sandstone, and has a stepped hexagonal base, which may be the base of a medieval churchyard cross. On the base is an octagonal shaft with a moulded plinth and capping, and on the top are a brass inscribed plate and a gnomon. The structure is also a Scheduled Monument.	II
Eardiston House; 52.81891°N 2.93561°W	—	Early to mid 18th century	A farmhouse that was extended in the mid-19th century. It is in brick, the extension has a sandstone plinth, and the roofs are slated and hipped. The original block has three storeys and fronts of five and three bays, and the extension, which is recessed to the left, has two storeys. In the centre is a Doric porch with an entablature. The extension has a flat-roofed porch with a round-headed arch and a doorway with a semicircular fanlight. The windows are sashes, and there is a canted bay window containing a French window. In front of the extension is a mounting block.	II
Group of ten chest tombs 52.79353°N 2.89907°W	—	Mid 18th century	The chest tombs are in the churchyard of St John the Baptist's Church. They are in sandstone, their dates range from 1780 to 1805, and they have various designs.	II
Cart shelter, Shelvock Farm; 52.81076°N 2.93413°W	—	Late 18th century (probable)	The cart shelter is in sandstone and has a slate roof. At the south end are three open bays with wooden posts between them.	II
Linhay, walls and cart shelter, Shelvock Farm; 52.81065°N 2.93392°W	—	Late 18th century (probable)	The building is in two levels, and in sandstone with timber framing and weatherboarding on the upper level on the south, partly clad in corrugated iron, and with a slate roof. At the west end is a two-bay cart shelter.	II
Pradoe, service ranges and outbuildings 52.81725°N 2.95350°W	—	1785	A small country house that was extended mainly in the early 19th century. It is in red brick on a chamfered brick plinth, with a moulded eaves cornice, and a hipped slate roof. There are three storeys, fronts of five bays, and a single-storey extension to the east. In the centre is an entrance with double doors, most of the windows are sashes, some with moulded architraves, there are also canted bay windows and a French window. At the rear are service ranges and outbuildings in sandstone and red brick.	II*
Farm buildings east of Pradoe; 52.81757°N 2.95205°W	—	c. 1800	The farm buildings are in red brick with dentilled eaves and gabled and hipped slate roofs. They have two storeys and three ranges, forming a U-shaped plan around a courtyard. They contain stable doors, a dovecote, vents, windows, pitch holes, and carriage doors, and there are external steps.	II
Churchyard wall and lych gate 52.79351°N 2.89795°W	—	Late 18th or early 19th century (probable)	The wall, which incorporates earlier material, encloses the roughly oval-shaped churchyard of St John the Baptist's Church. It is in sandstone, with a plinth on the north side and triangular coping. At the southeast entrance is a lych gate dating from 1888. This is a timber framed structure on a low sandstone wall with chamfered coping, a tile roof with ornamental cresting and a cross finial, and inside it are benches.	II
Kitchen garden wall, Pradoe; 52.81818°N 2.95183°W	—	1805–06	The wall is in red brick with sandstone coping, and some capping in tile and slate. It has red brick pilasters, heating flues on the north side, and a square headed entrance with a stone surround on the south side. The wall encloses a rectangular area of about 90 metres (300 ft) by 60 metres (200 ft).	II
Carpenter's shop, Pradoe; 52.81738°N 2.95251°W	—	c. 1806	The carpenter's shop is in limestone with quoins, a slate roof, and two levels. In the north front is a horizontally-sliding sash window with a segmental head and an eaves hatch above. In the west gable end is a segmental arch with a keystone, a window to the left and a doorway in the upper level, both with segmental heads.	II
Farm buildings, pump and sink, Pradoe; 52.81751°N 2.95262°W	—	c. 1806	The farm buildings are in sandstone with slate roofs. They include a brewhouse, a dairy, a slaughterhouse, a malthouse, and pigsties. Adjacent to the buildings is a cast iron pump and sink. The pump has a plain ringed shaft, a fluted domed cap with a pointed finial and a slightly curved handle.	II
Farm buildings, Eardiston House; 52.81896°N 2.93486°W	—	Early 19th century	The farm buildings are timber framed with brick infill on a sandstone plinth, and have slate roofs. They have two levels, three ranges enclosing a cobbled courtyard, and another range at right angles to the north. The buildings contain various doorways and windows, eaves hatches, a vehicle entrance, and cross-shaped air vents. In the north range is a gabled doorway with a hoist.	II
Manure sump, Pradoe; 52.81729°N 2.95143°W	—	Early 19th century (probable)	The manure sump, no longer in use, consists of a red brick structure covered in earth. Steps on east side lead down to segmental-headed tunnel entrance.	II
Cowsheds, mixing-house and granary, Shelvock Farm; 52.81065°N 2.93466°W	—	Early 19th century	The range of farm buildings is in sandstone with slate roofs, and one storey. It contains windows, doorways and a cart entrance, all with segmental heads.	II
The Bridge Inn; 52.79457°N 2.88812°W		Early 19th century (probable)	The public house is in sandstone with corner quoins and a slate roof. There are two storeys and an attic, two bays, and a lean-to on the left. The doorway has an architrave, the windows are sashes, and there are two eaves dormers.	II
Pigsties and hen house, Shelvock Farm; 52.81035°N 2.93495°W	—	Mid 19th century (probable)	The pigsties and hen house are in sandstone with chamfered coping and slate roofs. There are three pigsties on the west side, and on the east side are two pigsties with a hen house above. To the south is a rectangular walled area.	II
Pradoe Church; 52.81720°N 2.94588°W		1860	An estate church to which the chancel and north aisle were added in 1864. It is in sandstone and has tile roofs with ornamental cresting, and is in Decorated style. The church consists of a nave, a south porch, a chancel, a north chancel aisle, and a north tower. The tower has two stages, a cornice with dogtooth decoration, and a pyramidal spire.	II
Ruyton Manor; 52.79923°N 2.92282°W	—	1860	A country house in the form of a Norman castle, it is built in red sandstone, and has a moulded eaves cornice, a parapet, and hipped slate roofs. The house is mainly in two storeys, and has a front of nine bays, the middle three bays rising higher to form a machicolated embattled tower. The windows are round-headed, those in the ground floor forming an arcade. The central porch has clasping buttresses forming corner turrets, a round-headed arch, and a doorway with a semicircular fanlight. At the left corner is a tourelle, and on the right side is an almost detached octagonal tower.	II
Former coach house, Ruyton Manor; 52.79927°N 2.92105°W	—	c. 1860	The coach house, later used for other purposes, is in red sandstone, with a parapet to the south and a slate roof. In the centre of the south front is a slightly projecting tower with a corbel table and an embattled parapet. It contains a round-headed window and an arrow slit above. At the rear are double doors flanking an open bay.	II
Outbuilding north of Ruyton Manor; 52.79941°N 2.92268°W	—	c. 1860	The outbuilding is in red sandstone, and has an embattled parapet and a slate roof. The north range has a segmental-headed doorway and two rectangular windows, and in the D-shaped east range is a rectangular window and a twin round-headed window with imposts and a hood mould.	II
Terraces, balustrades and steps, Ruyton Manor; 52.79903°N 2.92280°W	—	c. 1860	The structures to the south of the house are in red sandstone, and consist of a series of terraces linked by flights of steps. In the front are square-shaped balusters, with ball finials in the front and on the corners. The rear terrace has a small tower-like projection.	II
Cross; 52.79455°N 2.90391°W		Late 19th century	The cross stands in a road junction, it is in sandstone, and in Gothic style. There is an octagonal base of four steps, a square shaft with diagonal buttresses, and on each face is an opening with wrought iron railings. At the top is an embattled cornice, and above this is a stepped pyramidal finial surmounted by a cross.	II
War memorial 52.79476°N 2.89271°W		1920	The war memorial takes the form of a cave in a sandstone cliff. In the cave is a cross, stone benches, and stone plaques with inscriptions and the names of those lost in the two World Wars.	II
