= Christmas Island Phosphate Co.'s Railway =

Industrial railway on Christmas Island

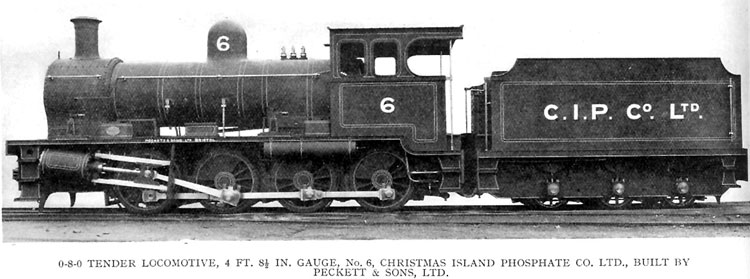
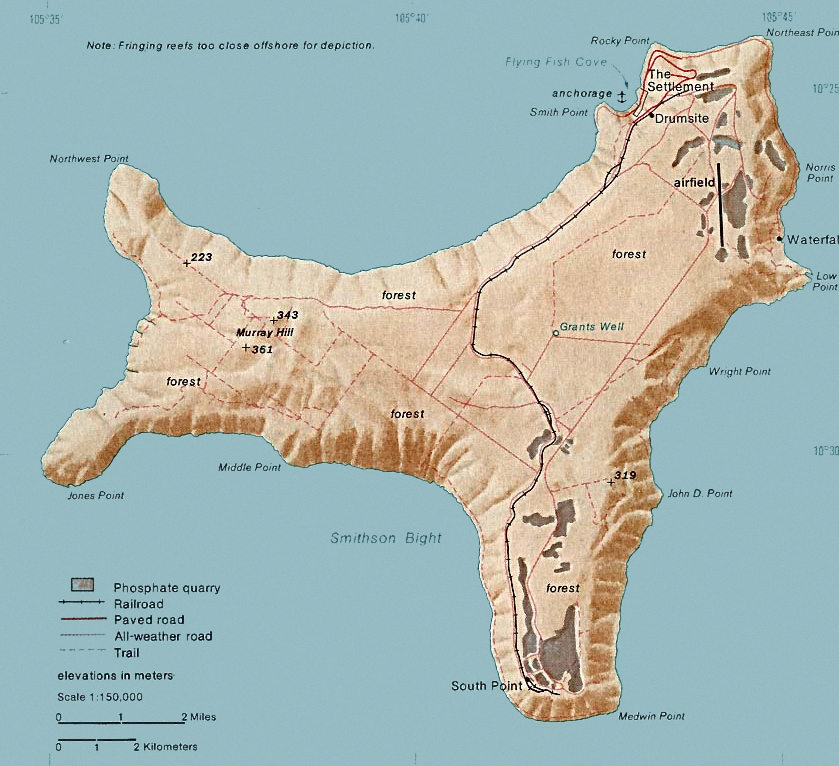
- Peckett & Sons 1931 built 0-8-0 tender locomotive Map of Christmas Island with the railway line

Technical
- Line length: 12.7 km
- Track gauge: 1,435 mm (4 ft 8 1/2 in) and 610 mm (2 ft)

The Christmas Island Phosphate Co.'s Railway was a 19.7 km (12¼ miles) long industrial railway between Flying Fish Cove and South Point on Christmas Island. The remains of the South Point station are now heritage-listed.

== Tracks ==
The standard gauge 1,435 mm (4 ft 8 1/2 in) track was laid in stages between 1914 and 1920. It was primarily used for transporting phosphate from the mines, but it also transported passengers, such as the miners' children to school. When phosphate mining ceased, the railway was taken out of use in 1987. The tracks have been lifted and scrapped by now. Various remains including a GE 44-ton switcher diesel engine are still on the island.

It ran from Drumsite to South Point Settlement. It was extended from Drumsite to Phosphate Works in 1958 and to Phosphate Hill 1961.

In addition, the company operated a narrow gauge railway with 610 mm (2 ft) gauge on the island.

== Rolling stock ==
=== Locomotives ===
Forty steam and internal-combustion locomotives were used on the island. These were imported from Australia, Canada, Germany, the United Kingdom and the US including three 70 ton geared Shay locomotives, a type of locomotive predominantly used within the US. According to the time table, the Shay locomotives needed 2 hours per trip, requiring 20–30 minutes on each journey for refuelling with wood and water. They hauled normally 16 steel hopper wagons of 15 tons tare and 22 tons load each, i.e. an average load of approximately 600 tons behind the tender.

On the standard gauge lines were seven steam locomotives, from Lima Locomotive Works, Peckett and Sons and Robert Stephenson and Hawthorns in use. Additionally ten standard gauge internal combustion locomotives from Orenstein and Koppel, Whitcomb, Canadian Locomotive Company and General Electric were used.

On the narrow gauge railway, there were twenty-three 610 mm (2 ft) gauge internal-combustion locomotives from Orenstein & Koppel, Robert Hudson, Baguley and Hunslet Engine Company, with the oldest dating from around 1912.

== Passenger vehicles ==
For passenger transport a Drewry railcar and three Wickham railcars with five trailers were used. The key objective of the Wickham railcars was to provide rolling stock for the School Train. A few flat wagons were also modified for transporting passengers. These were for instance used for the Picture Train, to transport passengers to and from the island’s cinema. There were also two unusual rail vehicles for carrying passengers on an incline.
