= Drewry Car Co. =

Rolling stock manufacturer

- Company type: Private
- Industry: Transport
- Founded: 1906
- Founder: James Sidney Drewry
- Defunct: 1984; 42 years ago
- Headquarters: ?, United Kingdom
- Area served: Worldwide
- Products: Diesel locomotives, railcars

The Drewry Car Co. was a railway locomotive and railcar manufacturer and sales organisation from 1906 to 1984. At the start and the end of its life it built its own products, for the rest of the time it sold vehicles manufactured by sub-contractors.

It was separate from the lorry-builder, Shelvoke & Drewry, but it is believed that James Sidney Drewry was involved with both companies.

== History ==
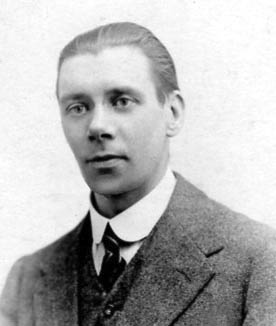
James S. Drewry, founder

Charles Stewart Drewry (c. 1843–1929) ran a motor and cycle repair business called Drewry & Sons at Herne Hill Motor Works, Railway Arches, Herne Hill, London. His son, James Sidney Drewry (1882–1952), formed the Drewry Car Co on 27 November 1906 and opened a small works in Teddington where he started building Birmingham Small Arms Company (BSA) engined rail trolleys and inspection railcars. The products of this works were sold by A.G. Evans & Co of London. A ready market was found in South America, Africa and India.

In 1908, BSA (of motor-cycle fame) took over building the railcars in Small Heath, Birmingham. The person in charge of this was Ernest Baguley who had joined BSA from Ryknield Motor Company in 1907. In 1911 Ryknield went into administration and Ernest Baguley left BSA and bought the Ryknield Shobnall Road works from the liquidator, forming Baguley Cars. In 1912 Baguley Cars took over the sub-contract manufacture of the Drewry railcars from BSA. The Drewry locomotives were soon fitted with Baguley's own 'R'-type engine.

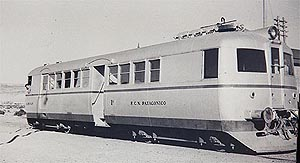
Drewry railcar used in Argentine Comodoro Rivadavia Railway in the 1940s

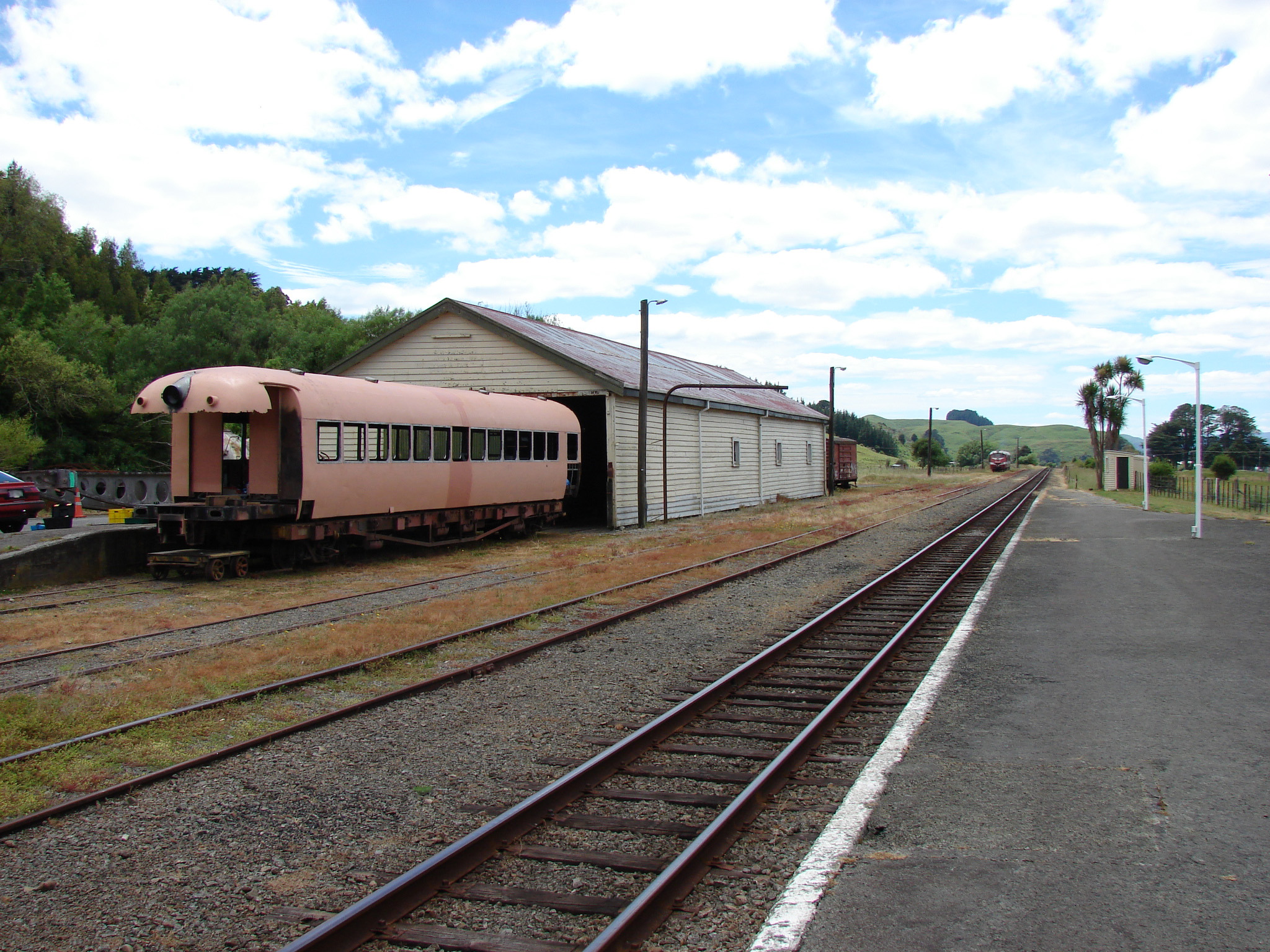
NZR RM class (88 seater) under restoration

In 1923, Baguley changed its name from Baguley Cars Ltd to Baguley (Engineers) Ltd, but in the late 1920s Drewry had ambitions for standard gauge railcars, which were on a scale not readily accommodated in the Baguley works, and from 1930 many Drewry locomotives were built instead by the English Electric company. Baguley (Engineers) Ltd failed in 1931.

In 1931, Drewry had a very successful demonstration of its new petrol engined railcar (made by English Electric) on the 7 mile line from Preston to Longridge. This comprised one powered carriage, and one trailed carriage. The powered car had two 155 hp Parsons M8 engines, and the transmission was 5-speed self-changing. The powered coach had 16 first class seats and 26 second class, the trailed coach was all first class.

The demonstration train was one built for service on the Bermuda Railway, and the passengers were VIPs of the railway world from many countries and companies. In Bermuda they gave good service until the railway closed in 1948, and then the railway locomotives and rolling stock were shipped to British Guiana - where they were used until that line closed in 1972. Drewry went on to export its railcars to many countries, including 35 to New Zealand.

In 1933, the London, Midland and Scottish Railway (LMS) announced that it was to hold an extensive trial of heavy oil locomotives for shunting duties, and among the contenders was a Drewry shunter built by the English Electric company. This was a 26-ton 0-4-0 and had an Allen 8RS18 176 hp, eight-cylinder diesel engine. It was delivered in spring 1934, and after operating in Salford goods yard it was sent on loan to the War Department in 1940, and they purchased it in 1943. The shunting locomotive appeared successful, and in 1938 it was reported that Drewry Car Co had received an order for 15 from the New Zealand government, to be built for Drewry by Dick, Kerr & Company, Preston. It says a lot for the robustness of the Drewry design that two of these pre-war locos are still in use - see New Zealand TR class locomotive. In the post war period Drewry shunters were adopted as the British Rail Class 04 shunters, of which 142 were built.

While Baguley (Engineers) Ltd had failed in 1931, E E Baguley Ltd rose from the ashes to maintain existing Baguley locomotives, and their business grew so that in 1934 they opened their new works in Uxbridge Street, Burton-on-Trent and started producing their own Baguley diesel locomotives, and rail inspection vehicles for Drewry.

Drewry continued as a successful locomotive and railcar company in the post-war years, though it had no production facilities. It continued to rely on contracting out the manufacture, using companies such as Vulcan Foundry and Robert Stephenson & Hawthorns.

In 1962, Drewry acquired a controlling interest in E E Baguley Ltd, and formed Baguley-Drewry Ltd, thus once again building its own locomotives, in Burton upon Trent. The company closed in 1984.

== Output ==
=== Shunting locomotives ===
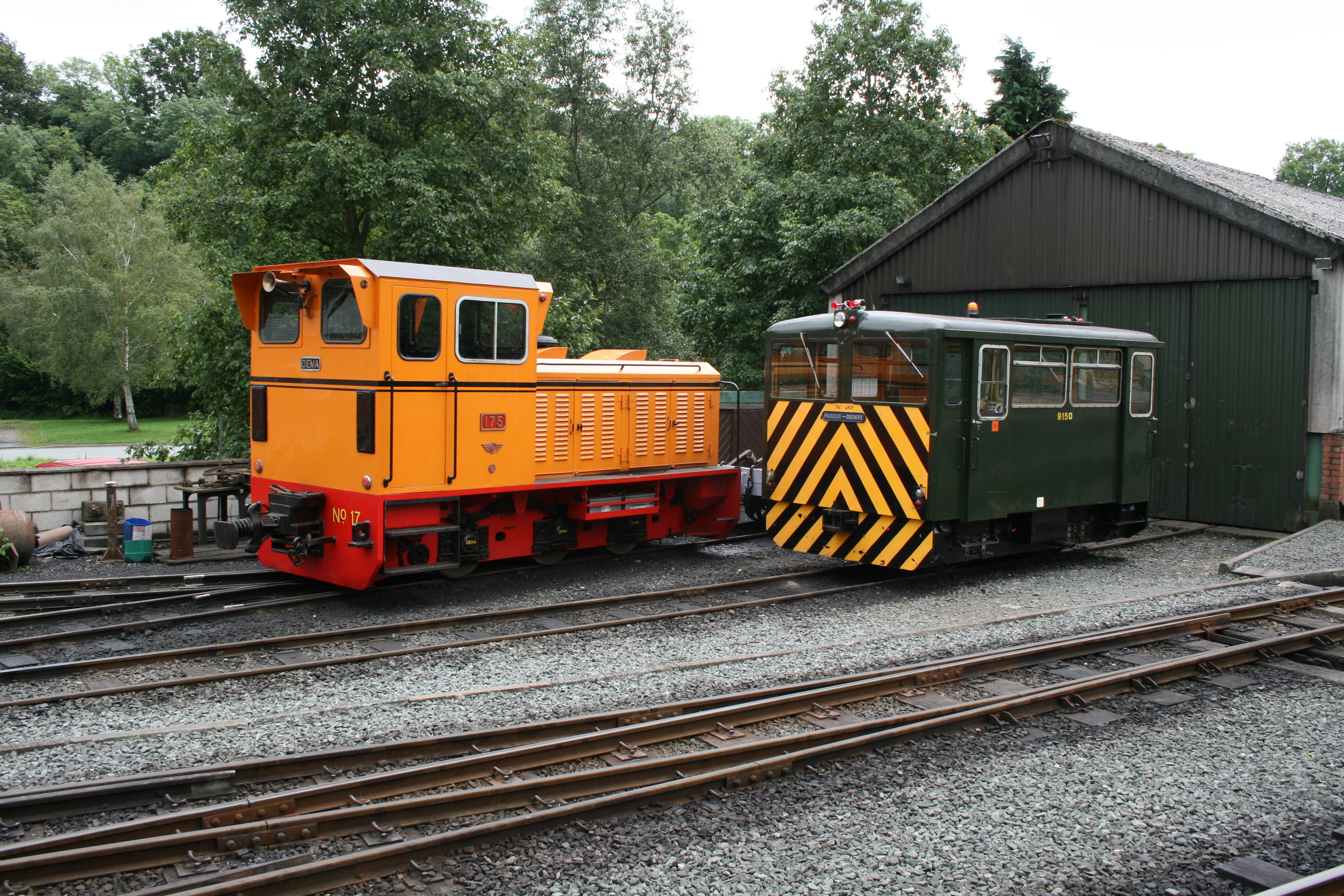
A Baguley-Drewry inspection car (right) on the 2 ft 6 in (762 mm) gauge Welshpool and Llanfair Light Railway in Wales

- 29 TR class for the New Zealand Railways Department
- 1 LMS diesel shunter 7050
- 142 British Rail Class 04s
- 16 DS class for the New Zealand Railways Department
- 19 DSA class for the New Zealand Railways Department
- 25 DSB class for the New Zealand Railways Department
- 1 0-6-0 shunter for the Mount Lyell Mining & Railway Company
- 18 Western Australian Government Railways Y class
- 6 Western Australian Government Railways Z class

=== Railcars ===
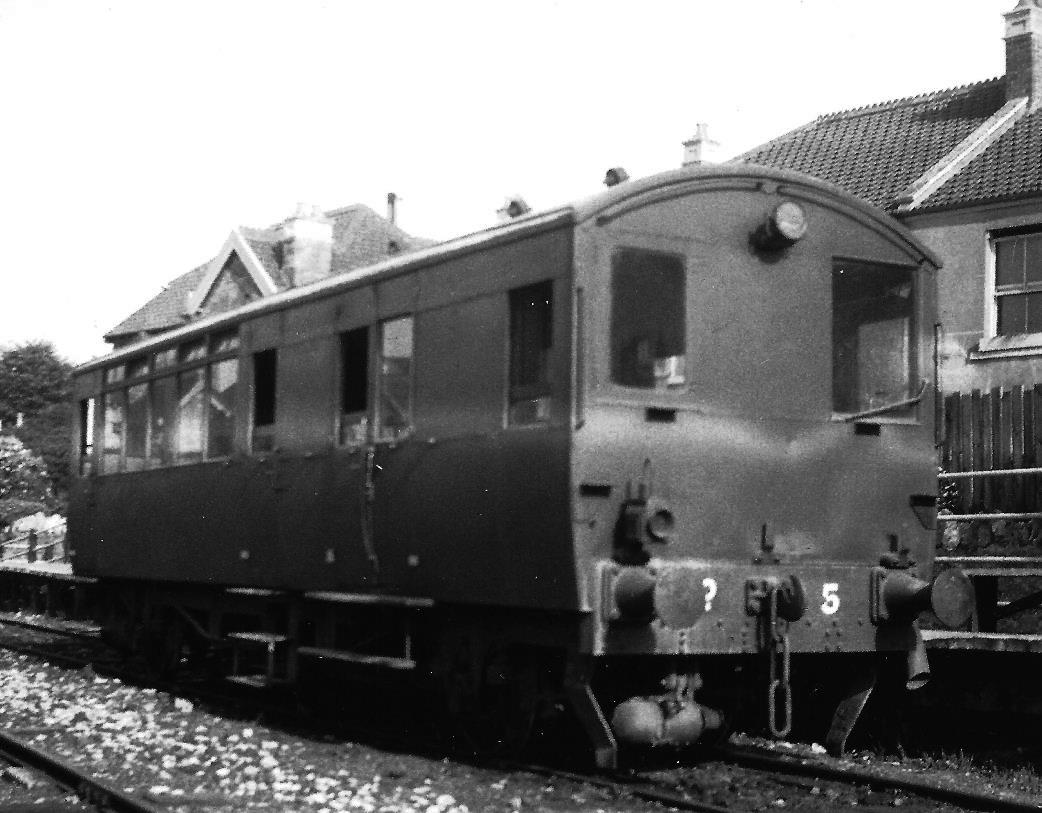
The railcar supplied to the Southern Railway in 1928 and later used on the Weston, Clevedon and Portishead Light Railway

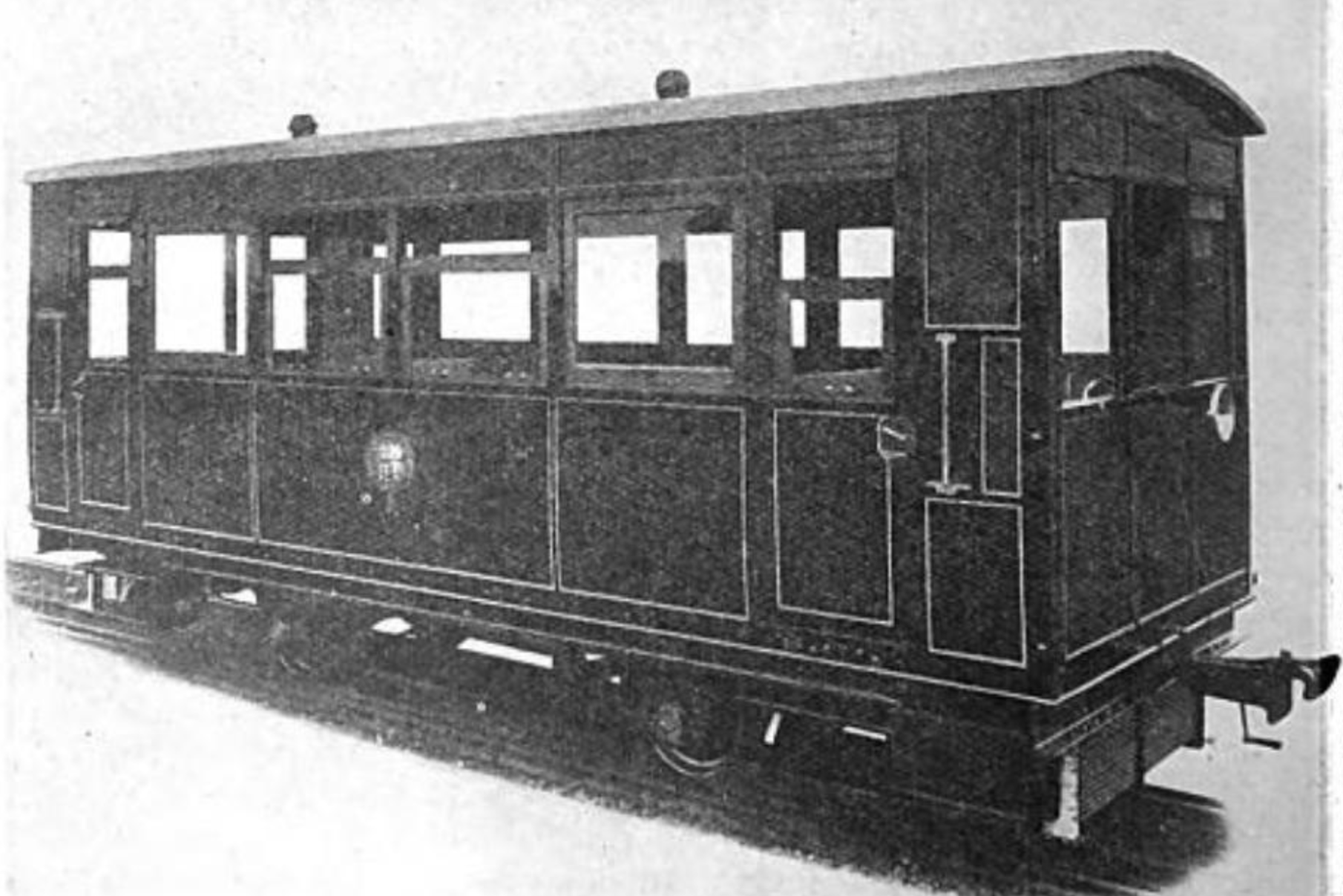
3ft gauge Drewry railcar for the Great Southern Railways, Ireland

- 1 for the Weston, Clevedon and Portishead Light Railway (WC&PR) in 1921, with a matching trailer supplied in 1923. Both were broken up in 1940.
- 1 for the Southern Railway in 1928. It was tested on various branch lines in southern England but found to be too small for most purposes. It was sold to the WC&PR in 1934 and broken up in 1940.
- 35 RM class for the New Zealand Railways Department from 1955
- 1 for the Christmas Island Phosphate Co.'s Railway
- Tasmanian Government Railways DP class
- Railcars for the Ryde Pier tramway

== Sources ==
- "The Drewry Car Company:1906-1970". Industrial Railway Record (40). Industrial Railway Society. 1972.
- Marsden, Colin J., (2003) The Diesel Shunter, Oxford Publishing, ISBN 0-86093-579-5
- The Railway Products of Baguley-Drewry Ltd and Its Predecessors, Civil, A, and Etherington, R, (2008), The Industrial Railway Society, ISBN 978-1-901556-44-5
