= Yvonne Drewry =

English artist and art teacher

- Born: Yvonne Marjorie Drewry; February 18, 1918; Brentford, Middlesex, England
- Died: August 9, 2007 (aged 89); Woodbridge, Suffolk, England
- Movement: 8+1 Suffolk Group
- Spouse: Robert Alexander Campbell (m. 1941)

Yvonne Drewry (18 February 1918 – 9 August 2007) was an English artist and art teacher, noted for her work in and around Suffolk.

== Early life and education ==
Yvonne Marjorie Drewry was born in Brentford, Middlesex, to Alfred F. Vere Drewry (1888-1980) and his wife Ada, née Anniss (1883-1965). Her father ran a motor parts shop on Deansgate in Manchester. Her uncle James Sidney Drewry was an engineer and co-founder of Shelvoke and Drewry, one of the UK's largest manufacturers of municipal waste wagons and fire engines.

After studying at Southport College of Art, in 1939 Drewry won an Andrew Grant scholarship of £120 a year for three years to train at the Edinburgh College of Art, where she studied under William George Gillies, John Maxwell and book illustrator Joan Hassall.

== Work ==
Drewry was a prolific artist, working in oil, watercolour, and pen and ink. She was also a notable print-maker and typographer. Her other work included woven textiles and handicrafts. Her work was exhibited regularly in Suffolk galleries, including an annual exhibition at the Denis Taplin Gallery in Woodbridge, Gallery 44 in Aldeburgh, Mall Galleries, Gainsborough's House, Sudbury, Wolsey Art Gallery, Ipswich, and in her own studio, and featured several times in local press articles; she also exhibited internationally and made sales in France and the US, and is licensed through Bridgeman Images.

From 1985 she was part of the 8+1 Suffolk Group, a group of nine artists that teamed up together to manage and present their own exhibitions. Their first show was at Broughton Gallery, Lanarkshire in August 1985. Her main subjects were landscapes and seascapes celebrating the Suffolk countryside, along with still life pictures of flowers, plants and trees, including those growing in her own garden; she also produced occasional portraits. Her work was mainly figurative, although her later works were much more abstract in character, using vivid colours and broad brushstrokes. She is mentioned in Patrick Trevor-Roper's influential book The World Through Blunted Sight: An inquiry into the influence of defective vision on art and character (1970) as having different colour perception in each eye. Her works are rarely titled, and whilst the landscapes are clearly recognisable, they are not usually particularly well-known views, although she did paint Snape Maltings and Shingle Street. She was highly commended in the 1994 Laing Art Competition. She generally worked from life and travelled around Suffolk and Norfolk in a Fiat 238 camper van seeking suitable subjects.

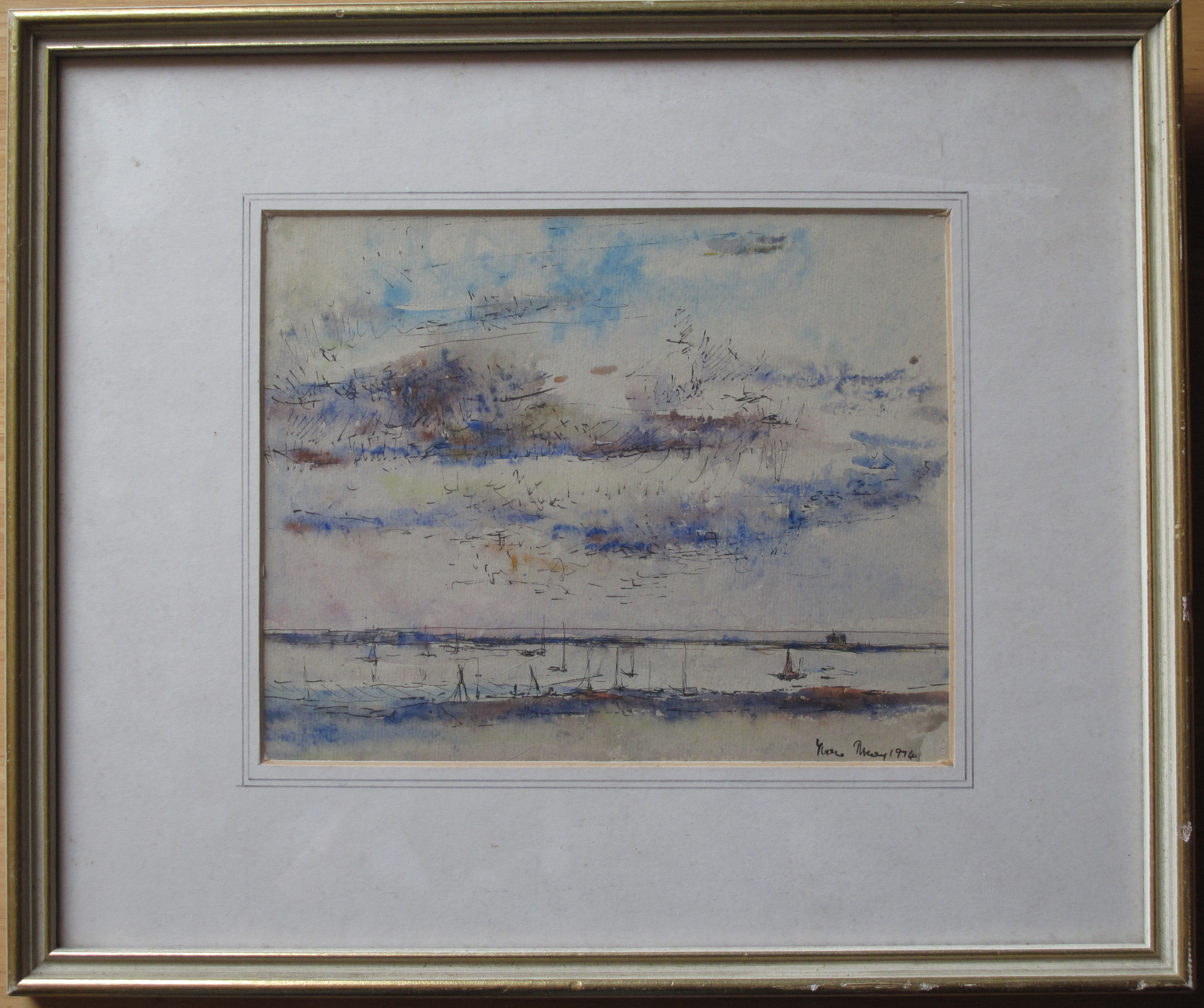
Watercolour by Yvonne Drewry, 1974

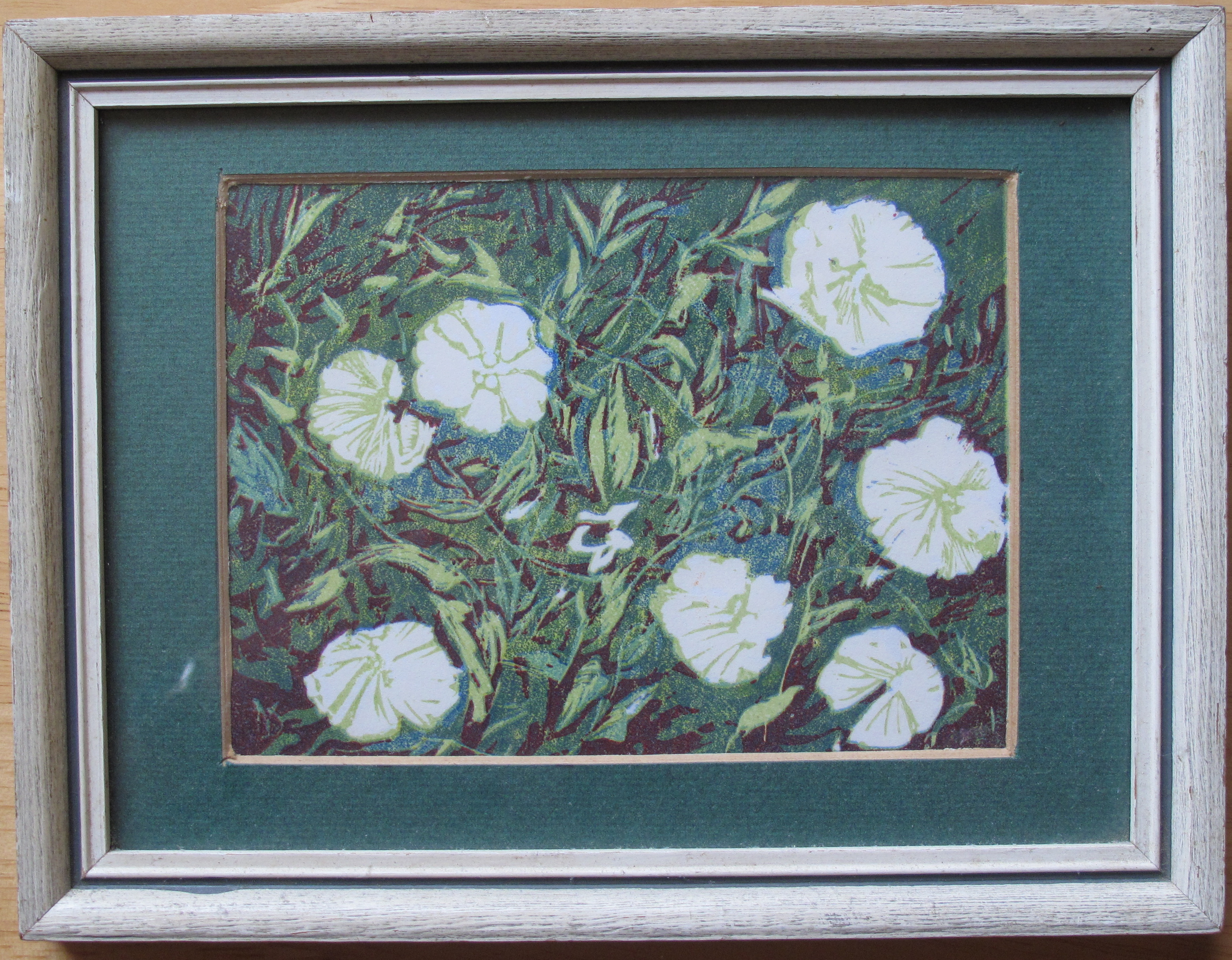
Linocut by Yvonne Drewry, 1976

=== Oil ===
Working largely on board, her oil paintings used a broad impasto with vivid colours. The earlier work is mainly figurative, but her later works were more impressionistic and dramatic. They were generally signed "Yvonne Drewry" and the year in oil paint.

=== Watercolour ===
The watercolour paintings were small, many being pen and ink drawings tinted with colour wash. They were generally signed "Yvonne Drewry" and the year in pen.

=== Prints ===
Her earliest works, including book illustrations, were generally in woodcut, but later she worked mostly in multi-layered linocut, often with as many as eight or nine different colours, generally printing on handmade Japanese paper. Most prints were unsigned, but some contained the initials "YD" in a cartouche.

=== Books ===
In 1943 Yvonne Drewry illustrated "World Under Water, the Adventures of Matthew, Jill and Poco", published with Robert Campbell at the Symbole Press, Woodford Green, Essex. The first of four parts was "Matthew Explores", containing two colour prints by Drewry. From 1944, Drewry created several short run private press illustrated books that she printed herself on an Albion press and bound under the imprint The Black Mill Press, and later The Centaury Press (a reference to her favoured font, Bruce Rogers' Centaur (typeface), a well as the flower). The books were typically in editions of 24, printed on roughly cut handmade paper with slipcases. She illustrated existing work, including Edmund Spenser's Prothalamion, or used Japanese haiku to inspire her own illustrations; she also produced a posthumous edition of the engravings of Viola Paterson, who was the niece of the painter James Paterson and mother of Drewry's friend from her Edinburgh college days, the artist Anne Paterson Wallace.

=== Ephemera ===
Drewry produced her own exhibition catalogues and posters in letterpress, and also created her own Christmas cards, which were usually multi-coloured linocuts, showing the influence of Joan Hassall. She also produced hand woven cloth on a floor loom, and made textile items such as appliqué cushions, and produced smaller craft items sold in her annual Sales of Work.

== Teaching ==
Drewry was an important teacher of art at the Amberfield School in Nacton, in Felixstowe, and at various local authority run evening classes for adults; she also ran short painting and printing courses in her own home. She was active in various art groups including the Deben (later Felixstowe) Art Group. Her pupils included Maggi Hambling, who cites her as a major childhood influence, and Malta based artist Juliet Horncastle.

== Personal life ==
In 1941, Drewry married Robert Alexander (Bob) Campbell (1916-2008), whom she met at Edinburgh College of Art. In 1942 they moved to Trimley St Martin in Suffolk, where they had four children. Drewry and Campbell had separated by 1968, when Campbell emigrated to Canada. Although known in her personal life after marriage as Mrs. Campbell, she always painted and exhibited under the name Yvonne Drewry.

In 1977 Drewry moved briefly to Tuddenham St Martin, before settling in Hollesley in 1980, where she lived until 2004. Suffering from Alzheimer's disease, she spent her last years in a nursing home in Woodbridge, and died in 2007 aged 89.

Drewry Way, on The Lilacs housing development in Trimley St Martin, is named after her.

== Selected exhibitions ==
- 1944 "Young Liverpool Artists", Walker Art Gallery, Liverpool
- 1956 The Australian Women's Weekly Portrait Prize for 1956
- 1981 Gainsborough House, Sudbury
- 1984 Denis Taplin Gallery, Woodbridge
- 1985 Broughton Gallery, Lanarkshire
- 1991 Laing Art Competition, Mall Galleries
- 1994 Laing Art Competition, Mall Galleries (Highly Commended)
- 1995 Ipswich Open, Wolsey Art Gallery
- 1996 Denis Taplin Gallery, Woodbridge
