= Trimley St Martin =

Village in Suffolk, England

Coordinates: 51.991°N 1.313°E

Trimley St. Martin
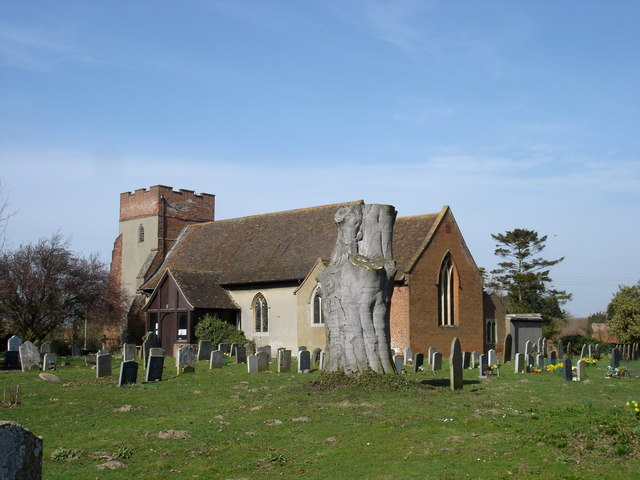

- Location within Suffolk
- Population: 1,942 (2011)
- OS grid reference: TM 274 377
- Civil parish: Trimley St Martin
- District: East Suffolk
- Shire county: Suffolk
- Region: East
- Country: England
- Sovereign state: United Kingdom
- Post town: Felixstowe
- Postcode district: IP11
- Dialling code: 01394

Trimley St. Martin is a village and civil parish in the East Suffolk district, in the county of Suffolk, England. It lies between the rivers Orwell and the Deben, on the long narrow tongue of land from Ipswich to Felixstowe referred to as the Colneis Hundred. In 2011 the parish had a population of 1942.

The village, and its neighbour Trimley St. Mary, are famous for their adjacent churches, which were built as the result of a historical family feud. St. Martin's church is the northerly church (at grid reference TM 276 370).

== History ==
Archaeological findings in the Hams Farm area show evidence of prehistoric, Roman, Anglo-Saxon and late post-medieval workings, including fired flints and a number of Central Gaulish Samian ware pieces. In nearby Walton, recent archaeological findings show evidence of Bronze Age field systems in use. The Roman road through Trimley St Martin linked the Roman fort of Walton to the rest of Roman Britain. Recent evidence shows evidence of ring ditches near Cavendish Grove. There is evidence of an Anglo-Saxons settlement near Hams Hall

In the Middle Ages this area was often invaded, overrun, settled and populated by a variety of Scandinavian plunderers. These settlements all soon had their names, usually after the chieftain or leader. Over the centuries these first names have changed considerably, sometimes becoming quite unrecognisable. Trimley is no exception. It has variously been spelled as Tremeleaia, Tremlega, Tremlye, Tremele, Tremeleye, Tremleye and Tremley.

The Domesday Book of 1086 reveals a complex pattern of landholding in the area, with many vills described as being in Trimley. Alteston, Candlet, Grimston, Lestaneston, Morston, Plumgeard and Thorpe are all separately recorded, but their names have declined in importance, being remembered only in the names of Halls (Grimston) or farms (Candlet). In Trimley itself, the most interesting entry records the two churches here. Godric, commended to Northmann, held Trimley with 50 acres as a manor before the Conquest. In 1086 the manor was held by Turold from Roger Bigod, and included two acres of meadow, a free man under Turold with four acres of ploughland, a church with 20 acres and a church with eight acres. Also in Trimley, three free men commended to Northmann and one commended to Wihtmaer held six acres before the Conquest; this land listed under the holdings of Roger Bigod in 1086. Finally, Leofric, commended to the abbot of Ely, held 40 acres as a manor. Roger Bigod held him from the king in 1086. The estate remained with the Bigods until the death of a later Roger in 1306, and in 1312 the Bigod estates passed to Edward II's brother, Sir Thomas de Brotherton. Thomas is recorded building a church at Trimley shortly afterwards.

In the 14th century, the hamlet of Alston was incorporated into Trimley St Martin.

The parish was cut in half by the building of the Trimley-Walton bypass in 1974, which was built to stop port traffic going through the high streets of the Trimleys and Walton. In the early 1980s the village more than doubled in size with the building of the Barrett estate and other houses.

== Alteinestuna ==
This was a small medieval village located in Trimley St Martin

== Grimston Hall ==
In the 16th century, Grimston Hall was the seat of Thomas Cavendish "The Navigator". The Suffolk Traveller (1800 edition) originally by John Kirby reported that two Ilexes planted by Thomas Cavendish were still standing. The Ilexes may be Holm Oaks, thereby linking in with a long, anonymous poem which includes the lines: 'By God said Thomas Cavendish, Whatever may befall, I'll always love dear Trimley and the Oaks of Grimston Hall.'

== Pouch Meadow ==
In 1741 the Suffolk Traveller John Kirby (topographer) surveyed the area around Felixstowe and in his note on Trimley he mentioned 'the lane to the pouch', which led to a small meadow east of the two churches, which contained a spring of clear water, generally regarded the source of Kingsfleet. The stream can still be seen flowing out from a concrete opening that was constructed when the Civil Engineers covered the greater part of the meadow with what is now known as the Trimley Roundabout (A14 Junction 59). During dredging of the stream to assist the construction of the by-pass, a mill-stone was discovered which was identified as being medieval. The path that runs between a smock mill, which was near Mill Lane, and the top of pouch meadow is called CrowsWell Way

== Coprolite mining ==
Coprolite was mined heavily around Trimley St Martin and surrounding villages, and at the height of the industry the open cast method of mining was used. Huge holes were dug in the countryside to get at the precious commodity. Owners of land with viable seams were offered around £20 for the rights to mine their land, the price of a nice house in the Victorian era. Commercial mining was driven by large companies like Packards and Fisons.

== The Great Fire ==
On the night of 19 June 2013, the village hall was gutted by fire.

== Notable residents ==
- Thomas Cavendish (1560–1592), English explorer, "The Navigator"
- Maurice Norman (born 1934), footballer
- Yvonne Drewry (1918–2007), artist and printmaker
- Arnold Allen (born 1994), mixed martial artist
