= Alston, Suffolk =

Former village in Suffolk, England

Coordinates: 51.982°N 1.300°E

Alston was a medieval parish in the county of Suffolk. Without enough people to ensure its survival, the parish was consolidated with that of Trimley St Martin as early as 1362, according to John Blatchly in the 1975 revision of the 1937 book Suffolk Churches and Their Treasures by diocesan architect Henry Munro Cautley (1875-1959). The group of houses now called Trimley Street was in the parish of Alston. The parish included the still-surviving Grimston Hall, as well as the church St. John the Baptist, which was demolished before the Reformation. At the end of Trimley Street today there are two cottages to the right, and in the field to the left, the church St. John the Baptist stood. Alston was recorded in the Domesday Book as Alteinestuna.

In 1418 a labourer John Tabour alias Cavenham broke into the rectory and murdered the parson of Alston, John Sexteyn.
