= LMS diesel shunter 7050 =

LMS 7050
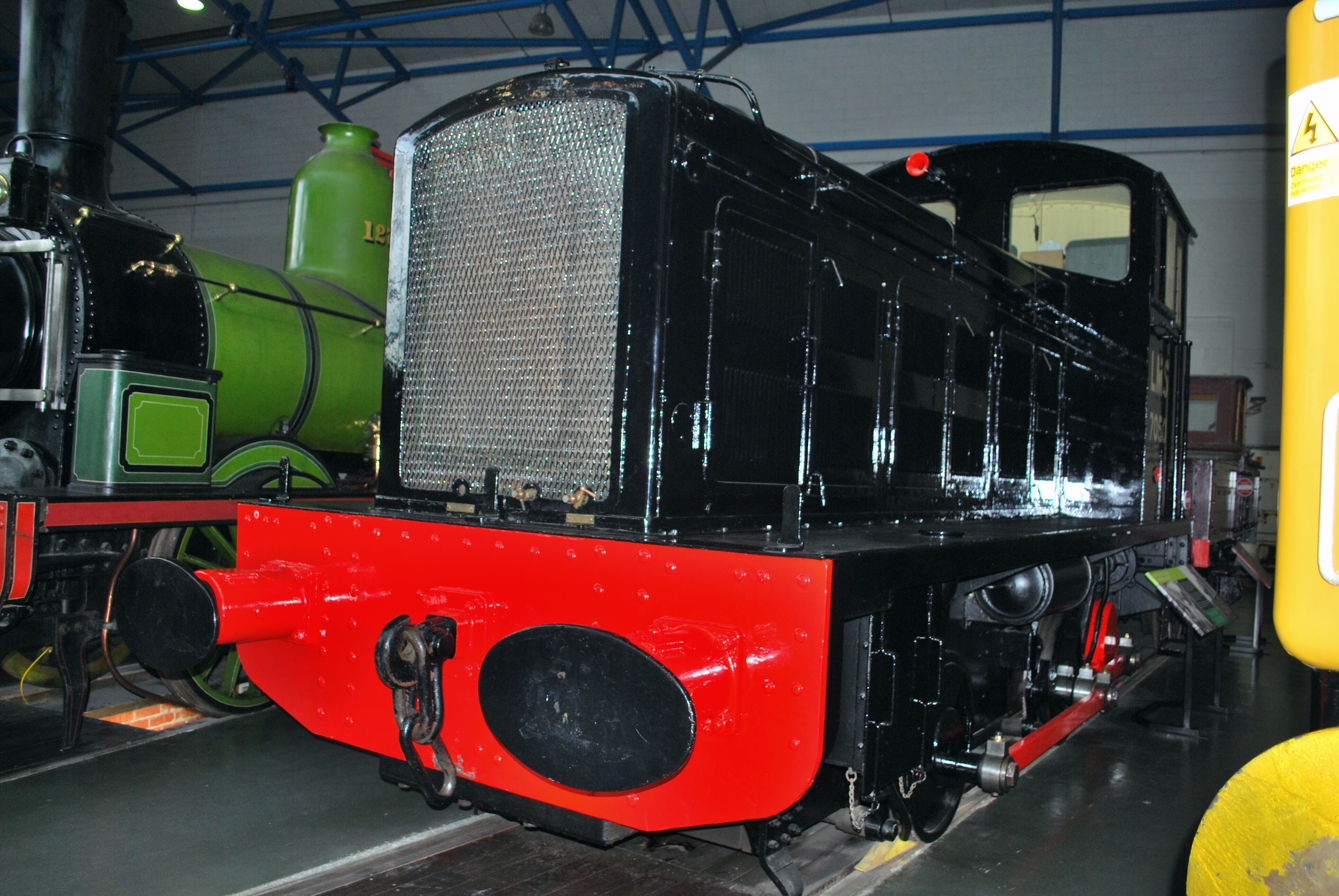
- Preserved LMS 0-4-0 diesel mechanical shunter No.7050 at the National Railway Museum
Type and origin
- Power type: Diesel-mechanical
- Builder: Drewry Car Co. at English Electric, Preston
- Serial number: Drewry 2047; English Electric 847
- Build date: 1934
- Total produced: 1
Specifications
- Configuration
  - Whyte: 0-4-0DM
- Gauge: 4 ft 8 1/2 in (1,435 mm) standard gauge
- Wheel diameter: 3 ft 0 in (0.914 m)
- Wheelbase: 7 ft 0 in (2.13 m)
- Length: 23 ft 10 1/2 in (7.28 m)
- Width: 8 ft 5 in (2.57 m)
- Height: 12 ft 8 in (3.86 m)
- Loco weight: 25 long tons 8 cwt (56,900 lb or 25.8 t); 25 long tons 8 cwt (25.8 t; 28.4 short tons)
- Fuel capacity: 100 imperial gallons (455 L; 120 US gal)
- Prime mover: W. H. Allen 8RS18 later Gardner 6L3
- Engine type: 8-cyl, later 6-cyl, Diesel
- Transmission: ENV and Bostock & Bramley
- Loco brake: Air brake
- Train brakes: None
Performance figures
- Maximum speed: 12 mph (19 km/h)
- Power output: 160 hp (120 kW) at 1,200 rpm, later 150 hp (110 kW)
- Tractive effort: 11,200 lbf (49.8 kN)
Career
- Operators: London, Midland and Scottish Railway; → War Department
- Number in class: 1
- Disposition: Preserved in 1979

LMS diesel shunter 7050 is an experimental 0-4-0 diesel-mechanical shunting locomotive, introduced by the London Midland and Scottish Railway (LMS) in 1934 and which remained in service with that railway for six years. It was later acquired for military use and is now preserved at the National Railway Museum.

== History ==
No. 7050 was an experimental locomotive built by the Drewry Car Co. at the English Electric Preston works in 1934. It carried an original number of 7400 only within the works and was delivered as LMS number 7050. For six years it was used for dock shunting at Salford before being loaned to the Air Ministry in 1940. It was withdrawn from LMS stock in March 1943 and sold to the War Department (WD) which numbered it 224. Subsequent renumberings by the WD, and later the Army, saw it carry numbers 70224 (in 1944), 846 (1952) and 240 (1968).

At some point it was rebuilt with a Gardner engine and was used at the Royal Navy base at Botley, Hampshire.

== Preservation ==
No 7050 was preserved in 1979, and displayed at the Museum of Army Transport in Beverley. Upon the closure of that Museum in 2003 it was transferred to the National Railway Museum in York.
