= James Sidney Drewry =

British engineer

James Sidney Drewry (1883 – 14 December 1952) was a British engineer, born in Clapton, London.

== Family history ==
James Sidney Drewry was the son of Charles Stewart Drewry and Julia Fava Wood. He married Mabel May Hyde and they had two daughters, Barbara and Christine. The artist Yvonne Drewry was his niece.

== Career ==
J. S. Drewry claimed to be the originator of the petrol railcar, having built his first machine at Teddington in 1902. He founded the Drewry Car Co. in 1906 with his father Charles Stewart Drewry. By 1910, Drewry was working for the Lacre Motor Company at Letchworth, Hertfordshire. In 1922, Drewry, together with Harry Shelvoke (another Lacre employee) set up the firm of Shelvoke and Drewry to manufacture road vehicles. He remained at Shelvoke and Drewry until 1936. He held over 60 patents, in his name, or jointly with others, for engineering inventions. James Sidney Drewry died at Letchworth, Hertfordshire on 14 December 1952.
