= South Point Settlement Remains =

- Location on Christmas Island
- Location on Christmas Island
- 10.5595°S 105.6455°E
- Location: South Point, Christmas Island, Australia

Commonwealth Heritage List
- Official name: South Point Settlement Remains
- Type: Listed place (Historic)
- Designated: 22 June 2004
- Reference no.: 105186

South Point Settlement Remains is a heritage-listed former settlement at South Point on Christmas Island, Australia. It was added to the Australian Commonwealth Heritage List on 22 June 2004.

== Description ==
The South Point Settlement Remains comprises the Chinese South Point Temple and two other small temples, ruins of three structures including the railway station and adjacent water tank and all other archaeological and structural remains of the settlement in the vicinity of the former town site.

The South Point area was the Island's most significant residential area for many years and between 1914 and 1974 was the major source of phosphate from the Island. It appears that the development of the South Point mining fields began from about 1914 and they became the main source for at least four decades. When the South Point ore deposits were approaching exhaustion, the upper Poon Saan residential area was built to house people who were relocated from South Point. When relocation was completed, the South Point residential area was almost totally cleared so that the ground beneath could be mined. Demolition of South Point was completed in 1977. As a result of the planned demolition, little above ground evidence remains of the former residential area. Surviving items include the South Point Chinese temple which is still in use, buildings to the north of the large temple, the ruins of the South Point Railway Station, an adjacent water tank and building of unknown function. The South Point Settlement area may include archaeological remains of historical importance.

=== Condition ===
There are little above ground remains of the South Point Settlement. The area may contain archaeological remains.

The railway station group is generally a ruin. The permanent way is fair, though all track has been removed and there is regrowth along the route, and new vehicle tracks have cut the permanent way. The railway platform and shelter are generally in good condition, though timberwork needs maintenance. The water reservoir is ruined, and the roof is removed and some internal columns have collapsed, and walls are damaged. The Old Loading Bridge is a ruin though it is stable.

== Heritage listing ==
The remnants of the original South Point settlement are historically significant as a reminder of one of the Island's early, major residential areas. The South Point area was the focus of mining activity from 1914 until relatively recently and the South Point Settlement housed many of the labourers working on the mines.
