= Ruyton-XI-Towns Castle =

Motte-and-bailey castle in Shropshire, England

- Shropshire, England
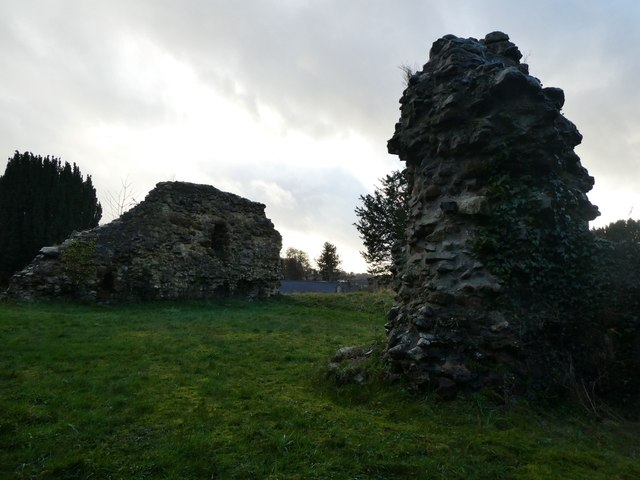

Site information
- Type: Motte-and-bailey castle
- Open to the public: yes
- Condition: Ruined

Location
- Shown within Shropshire
- Location within Shropshire
- Coordinates: 52.79359°N 2.89933°W

Site history
- Built: 1086
- Built by: Unknown
- In use: 1086 – 1360s
- Materials: Sandstone
- Demolished: 1364 and 1400
- Battles/wars: Glyndŵr rebellion

Ruyton-XI-Towns Castle, also known as Ruyton Castle, is a Grade II listed motte-and-bailey castle in Ruyton-XI-Towns, Shropshire, England which has partial ruins existing today.

== History ==
Shortly after the area of Ruitone was listed as "sparsely populated waste land" in the Domesday Book, Ruyton-XI-Towns Castle was constructed using timber in 1086 and it was replaced by a stone castle in 1148; it was acquired by John I Le Strange from William FitzAlan around 1155. The stone castle was first damaged by Fulk FitzWarin in 1203 and was destroyed by Welsh invaders in 1212; the Le Strange family subsequently abandoned the castle and it was in ruins by 1272.

Edmund FitzAlan purchased Ruyton-XI-Towns Castle in 1302 and had it repaired by 1313. It was then owned by Roger Mortimer in 1326 and the Earl of Arundel regained ownership of the castle after Mortimer was executed in November 1330.

Ruyton-XI-Towns Castle was repaired again in 1357 and was abandoned for the final time in 1364. It was further destroyed by Owain Glyndŵr during his rising against England beginning in 1400.

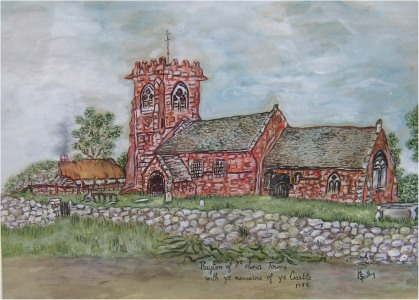
Saint John the Baptist Church and the cottages on the site of the castle, 1786

Masonry from the castle was used to repair the nearby Saint John the Baptist Church during the 15th century, and two cottages were built in the north of the castle in the 18th century, with one incorporating the castle ruins as one of the cottage walls. The cottages were present by 1786 and were demolished in 1881 when the land became absorbed within the parish churchyard.

Its ruins stand in the parish churchyard and the castle was Grade II listed on 19 January 1952.

== Excavation ==
Ruyton-XI-Towns Castle was excavated once in 1886 and the excavations were paid for by selling the building materials from the demolished cottages. The excavation was carried out by Rev. Frederick Paget Wilkinson and he identified the foundations of the bailey wall and the paved floor of the castle.

== Description ==
The remains of the castle are in sandstone, and consist of parts of three walls of a former rectangular tower on a slightly raised platform, and there are the footings of another wall. The remains have a maximum height of 10 metres (33 ft).
