= Ruyton-XI-Towns =

Village in Shropshire, England

Coordinates: 52.793°N 2.899°W

- The Cross in Ruyton-XI-Towns

- Location within Shropshire
- Population: 1,261 (2021)
- OS grid reference: SJ393221
- Civil parish: Ruyton-XI-Towns
- Unitary authority: Shropshire
- Ceremonial county: Shropshire
- Region: West Midlands
- Country: England
- Sovereign state: United Kingdom
- Post town: SHREWSBURY
- Postcode district: SY4
- Dialling code: 01939
- Police: West Mercia
- Fire: Shropshire
- Ambulance: West Midlands
- UK Parliament: North Shropshire

Ruyton-XI-Towns (/ˌraɪtən ɪˈlɛvən taʊnz/ "ry-tən eleven towns"), formally Ruyton of the Eleven Towns or simply Ruyton, is a village and civil parish next to the River Perry in Shropshire, England. It had a population of 1,261 at the 2021 Census.

The preparatory school Packwood Haugh is north of the village. Footpaths south of the village lead to the sandstone promontory known as The Cliffe. It is still an area of common land, which is the northern section of the Nesscliffe Hill Country Park.

== Toponym ==
Mentioned in the Domesday Book of 1086 as Ruitone, the village acquired its unusual compound name in the twelfth century when a castle was built, and it became the major manor of eleven local townships. The earliest occurrence of the inclusion of the Roman numeral for eleven in the name is stated to be 1379. Some of the eleven ancient townships, mostly situated to the north and west of Ruyton, still survive as hamlets today; although some, like Coton, are just a collection of farm buildings. The eleven were Ruyton, Coton, Shotatton, Shelvock, Eardiston and Wykey, which remain in the parish; and Felton, Haughton, Rednal, Sutton and Tedsmore, now in the parish of West Felton.

== History ==
Lying in the Welsh Marches, Ruyton Castle, begun in 1086 and first built in stone in 1148, was rebuilt by 1313 but was destroyed again by Owain Glyndŵr during his rising against England beginning in 1400. Its ruins stand in the parish churchyard.

In 1308, an attempt was made to refound the town as New Ruyton, when it was awarded a charter that briefly gave it the same powers as the County of Bristol. However, as raiding continued, the new town declined and lost most of its rights, its borough status (with that of Clun) being formally abolished in 1886.

The oldest parts of the parish church date from between 1120 and 1148. Masonry from the castle ruins was used in repairing the parish church later in the 15th century.

== Notable residents ==
- Corbet Kynaston, Jacobite Tory politician, died at Shelvock, one of his manors, in 1740.
- John Robert Kenyon, lawyer and Vinerian Professor of English Law at Oxford University, was born in 1807 and died in 1880 at Pradoe in the parish.
- Arthur Conan Doyle, while a medical student, worked as an unpaid assistant in the village for a Dr Eliot for four months in 1878, living at Cliffe House. He later recalled Ruyton in his Memories and Recollections (1923) as "not big enough to make one town, far less eleven".
- Frederic Richardson Murray, later Archdeacon of Belize (1907–1918), was formerly a curate at the parish church.
- William Blair-Bell, founder of the Royal College of Obstetricians and Gynaecologists, lived at Eardiston House in the parish prior to his death in 1936.

== War memorial ==
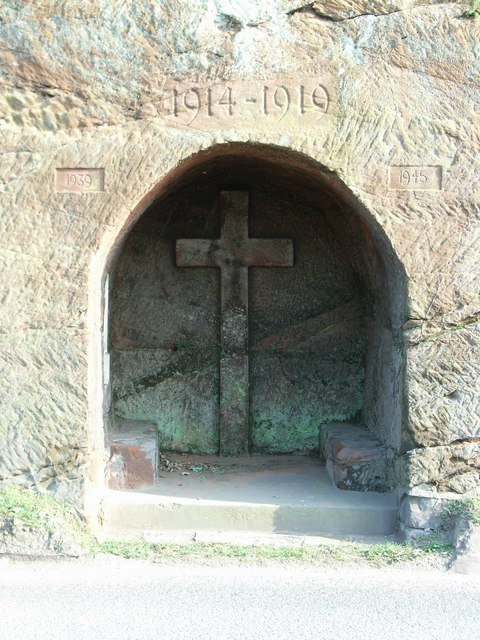
Ruyton war memorial

The parish's WWI war memorial is an 8 ft (2.4 m) carved cave within the sandstone cliff of the Brownhill. Located beside the road leading out of the village towards Baschurch, it is unique to Shropshire. It was conceived by the London architect Stanley Vaughan after a visit to Ruyton, and created by local father-and-son stonemasons Warwick and Len Edwards. The benches within the arch and the cross are all carved out of the rock. The memorial was unveiled in October 1920. The names of fallen from both the First and Second World Wars are listed on plaques within the archway. A third plaque, to an Alfred Rogers, was added in 2007 after he had been omitted from an earlier plaque.

== Namesake ==
Ruyton Girls' School (founded 1888) in Melbourne, Victoria, Australia, was named after this village; its founder, Charlotte Anderson, was great-great-granddaughter of David Evans, who was Vicar of Ruyton from 1788 to 1821.

== See also ==
- Listed buildings in Ruyton-XI-Towns
