= Township (England) =

Subdivision (usually of a parish) in England

In England, a township (Latin: villa) is a local division or district of a large parish containing a village or small town usually having its own church. A township may or may not be coterminous with a chapelry, manor, or any other minor area of local administration.

The township is distinguished from the following:

- Vill: traditionally, among legal historians, a vill referred to the tract of land of a rural community, whereas township was used when referring to the tax and legal administration of that community.
- Chapelry: the 'parish' of a chapel (a church without full parochial functions).
- Tithing: the basic unit of the medieval Frankpledge system.

'Township' is, however, sometimes used loosely for any of the above.

== History ==
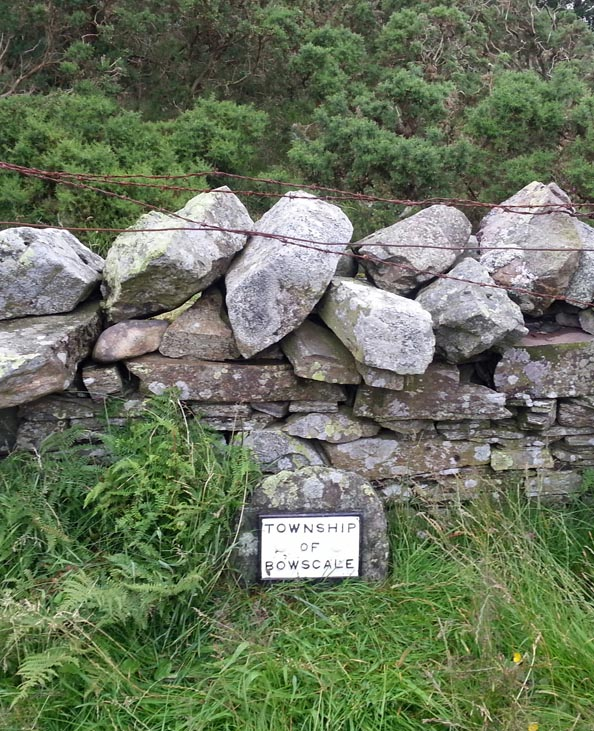
Township boundary marker at Mungrisdale, Cumbria. The marker has been restored for historical purposes.

In many areas of England, the basic unit of civil administration was the parish, generally identical with the ecclesiastical parish. However, in some cases, particularly in Northern England, there was a lesser unit called a township, being a subdivision of a parish. This could happen for several reasons:

- In some parts of Northern England, the parishes were too large to be managed conveniently. For example, Sheffield constituted a single parish, which had six townships in it — Ecclesall Bierlow, Brightside Bierlow, Attercliffe cum Darnall, Nether Hallam, Upper Hallam, and Sheffield itself. Whalley parish, in Lancashire, contained 47 townships and extended over 43,000 ha (105,000 ac).
- There or elsewhere, occasionally, different parts of a parish were in different hundreds or counties.
- Sometimes, one township included parts of several different parishes, as in Heworth near York, which included parts of the parishes of St Saviour, St Cuthbert and St Giles.

The local historian Dorothy Silvester has identified a "parish line", which divided northern from southern counties of England and Wales. In Denbighshire, Shropshire, Staffordshire, Derbyshire, the West Riding and North Riding of Yorkshire, and north of this line, parishes tended on the whole to be large, containing several townships. However, south of this line, parishes tended to contain single townships.

A township appointed overseers of the poor and surveyors of highways in the same way as a parish and they financed their obligations by levying a rate, in the same way as parish officials. The original definition of a civil parish was any place in respect of which a rate could lawfully be levied. Most townships disappeared before 1866 either being included into adjacent civil parishes or gaining their own separate civil parish status.

== Modern use ==
The use of the term 'township' persisted and has recently been revived as a name for subdivisions of boroughs in northern England. For example, the Metropolitan Borough of Rochdale has township committees, and the Metropolitan Borough of Wigan divides the borough into ten townships, which each have a township forum. Wirral is divided into forty-four, for planning purposes.

In Sheffield, Mosborough ward, which includes the districts of Halfway, Mosborough village, Waterthorpe, and Westfield, is one of the 28 electoral wards in the City of Sheffield. It is located in the eastern part of the city and is one of the wards that make up the Sheffield Attercliffe parliamentary constituency. The area is often referred to as Mosborough Townships, but this usage does not have any administrative significance.

In Shropshire, the name of Ruyton-XI-Towns preserves the memory only of medieval townships, eleven of which had been united under one manor; in Herefordshire, Bromyard still has areas referred to by the names of three townships besides that of the central town area.
