= Accles & Shelvoke =

- Founded: 1913
- Founder: James George Accles; James Shelvoke
- Fate: Acquired by Frontmatec
- Website: www.accles-shelvoke.com/front-page

Accles & Shelvoke is a company based in the English Midlands, founded in 1903 by James George Accles and James Shelvoke as Bennett's Successors Ltd, adopting its present name in 1913. It is a manufacturer of humane slaughtering pistols, and has developed them since the early twentieth century. Since 1952 it has also manufactured cable spikers, used to ensure high-voltage electrical cables are de-energised prior to working on them. In 2017, the company was acquired by Frontmatec.

== See also ==
- Accles & Pollock another Accles company
- Accles-Turrell automobile
