= Wykey =

Coordinates: 52.818°N 2.904°W

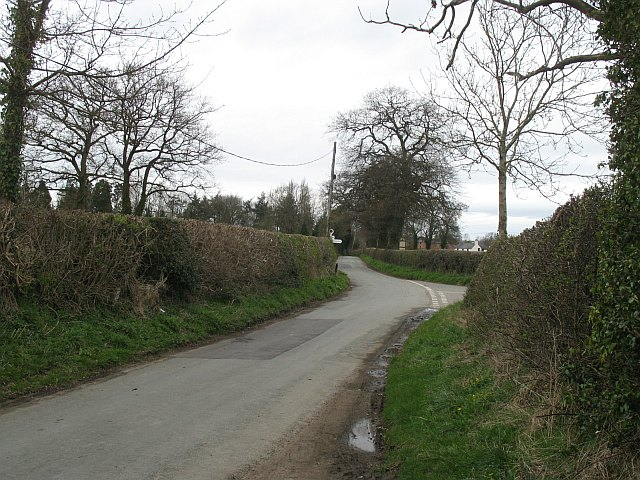
- A lane at Wykey

- Location within Shropshire
- OS grid reference: SJ390249
- Civil parish: Ruyton-XI-Towns
- Unitary authority: Shropshire
- Ceremonial county: Shropshire
- Region: West Midlands
- Country: England
- Sovereign state: United Kingdom
- Post town: SHREWSBURY
- Postcode district: SY4
- Dialling code: 01743
- Police: West Mercia
- Fire: Shropshire
- Ambulance: West Midlands
- UK Parliament: North Shropshire

Wykey is a hamlet in Shropshire, England.

It is approximately 2 miles north of the larger village of Ruyton-XI-Towns, and is recognised as one of the eleven ("XI") towns.

In the centre of the village one can find the rare sight of a 19th-century, Victorian red postbox and red telephone box, which amount to its only facilities.

== See also ==
- Listed buildings in Ruyton-XI-Towns
