= Shelvoke and Drewry =

English manufacturer of heavy-duty road vehicles

Shelvoke and Drewry Limited
- Industry: Waste collection vehicle
- Founded: 1921
- Defunct: 1991
- Fate: Merged
- Successor: Dennis Specialist Vehicles
- Headquarters: Letchworth, Hertfordshire, England
- Key people: Harry Shelvoke; James Drewry
- Products: Revopak, Welfreighter

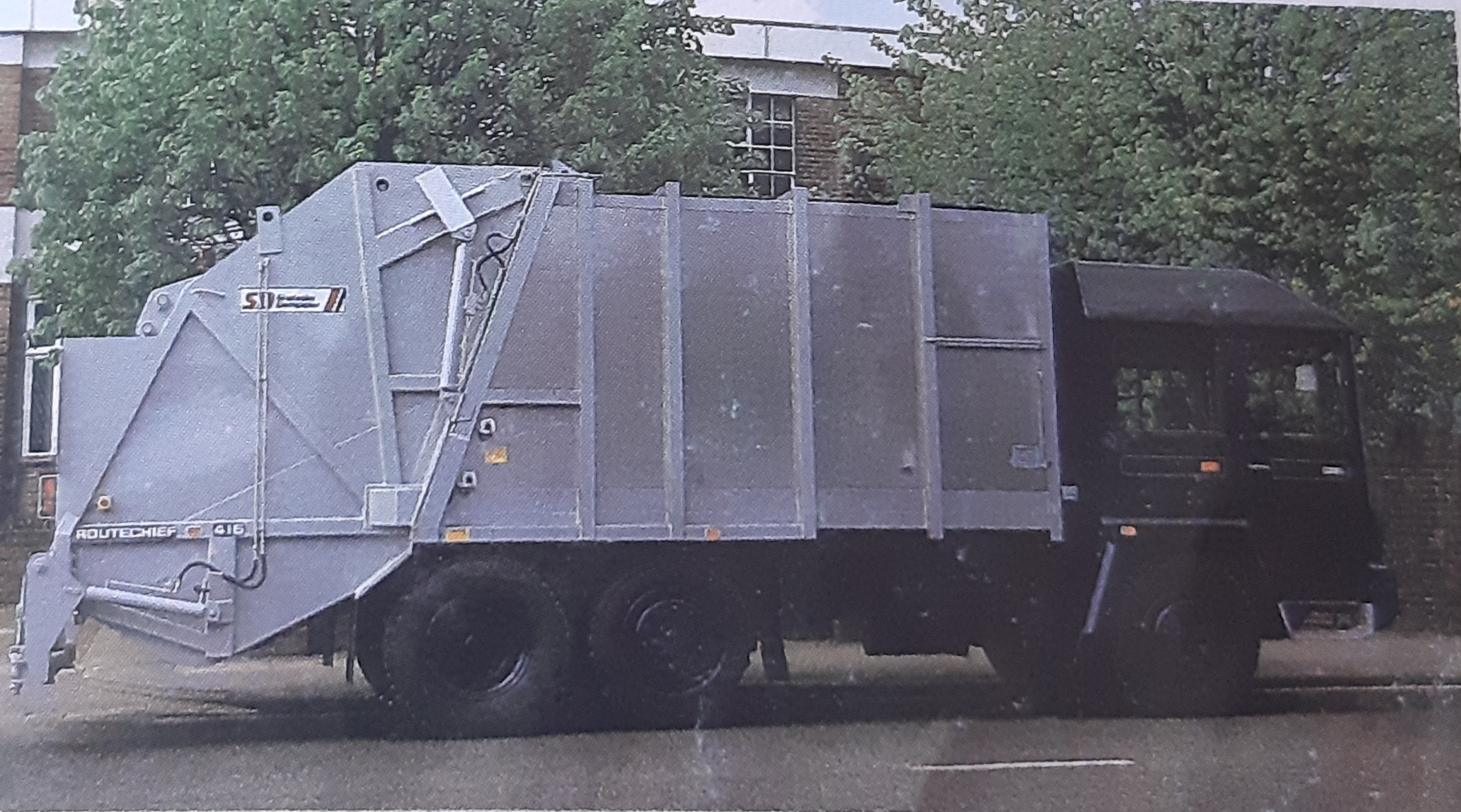
A 1990s Shelvoke Dempster Routechief TD Leyland engined

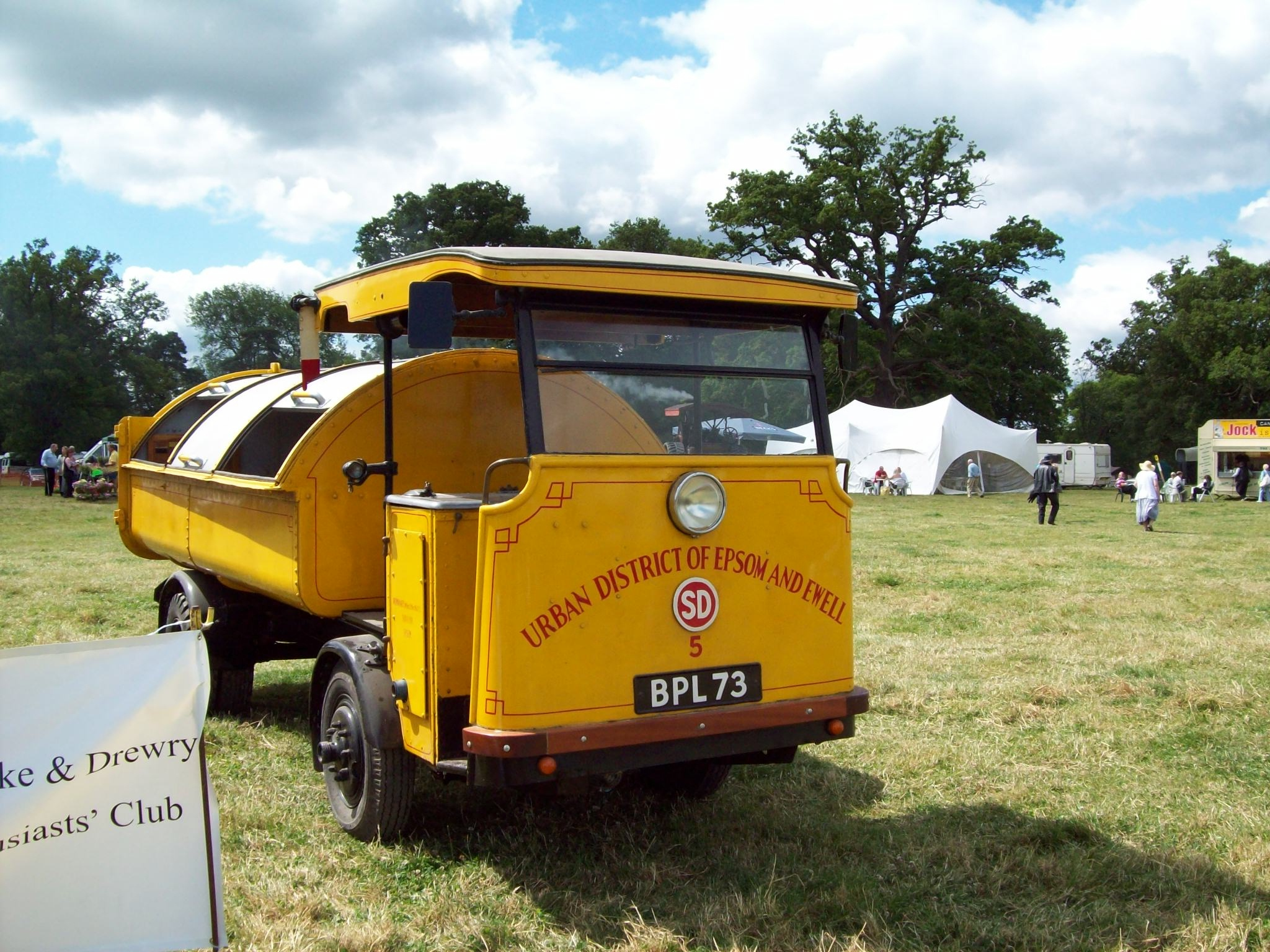
1934 Freighter

Shelvoke and Drewry was a manufacturer of special purpose commercial vehicles based in Letchworth, Hertfordshire. It was best known for its innovative waste collection vehicles that were the preferred choice of municipal authorities in the UK together with their gully emptiers, cesspool cleaning vehicles and street watering and washing vehicles.

Cable drum carriers were supplied to the General Post Office and vehicles and ground equipment built for the Royal Air Force.

Shelvoke and Drewry also manufactured fire engines, buses and fork-lift trucks.

== The Shelvoke and Drewry Freighter ==
The business began in 1921 as a partnership of Harry Shelvoke and James Drewry, both of whom had successful careers in commercial vehicle design and manufacture. At that time, municipal refuse vehicles were almost all horse-drawn, uneconomical and inconvenient and required the use of ladders. In their "S D Freighter", Shelvoke and Drewry offered a motorised, low-loading alternative which became almost universal.

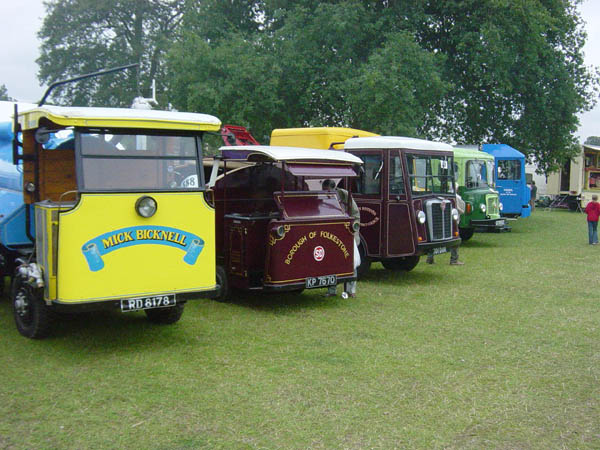
A selection of vehicles (From L-R: Freighter (x2), W-Type, T-Type, P-Type

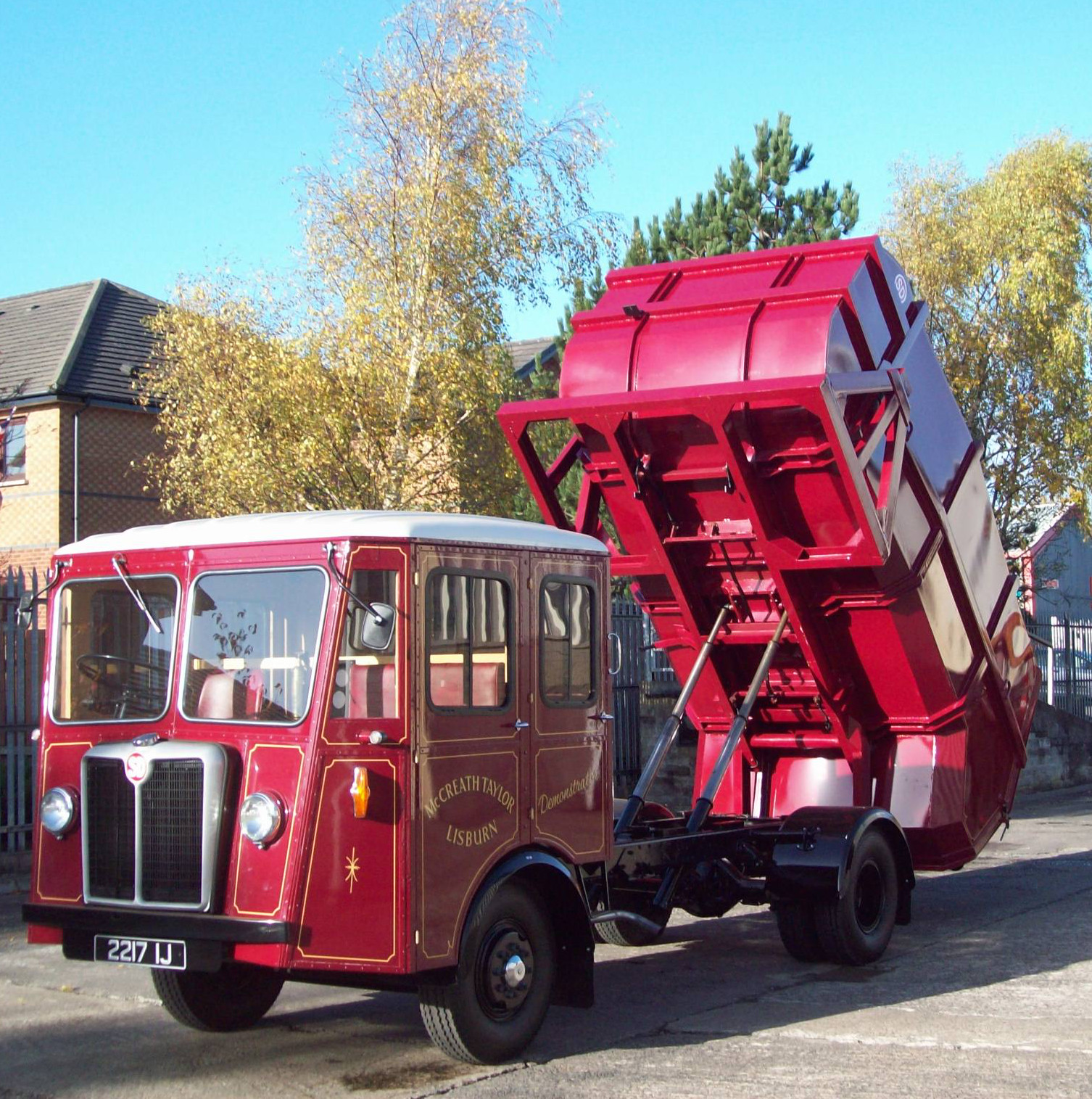
1959 W-Type fore and aft tipper

Ownership was soon transferred from their partnership to Shelvoke and Drewry Limited, incorporated 10 October 1922. A stock market listing was achieved in 1937. The "Freighter", originally a multi-purpose flatbed truck notable for its tiny wheels and tiller-type steering, was adapted for refuse collection. Several vehicles were also converted into single-decker buses and used in Worthing, West Sussex, where they were known as the Worthing Tramocars.

Shelvoke and Drewry rapidly became an established innovator in the field of refuse collection vehicle design, producing vehicles such as the Fore and Aft Tipper, which used a pivoting body to redistribute the load, and the Revopak of the 1970s, which used a huge revolving fork to mutilate and compact refuse.

=== War production ===
During the Second World War, like most British manufacturers, Shelvoke and Drewry's entire output was devoted to the war effort, producing aircraft parts, equipment for landing craft and tanks, and even a miniature submarine (the Welfreighter) at their Letchworth plant.

=== 1960s ===
Profits were falling by 1964. In that year the reasons given by the chairman were the introduction of their new Defiant forklift trucks, the transfer of production to a new factory building, and a scarcity of labour and materials in the face of intense competition from the big motor manufacturers.

== Subsequent owners ==
=== W P Butterfield 1966 to 1983 ===
In March 1966 Shelvoke and Drewry were bought by Yorkshire engineers W P Butterfield which later became a component of the Butterfield-Harvey Group. Butterfield-Harvey sold the Fork-lift trucks division to Rubery Owen Conveyancer in 1974. The chairman explained that with "limited labour and facilities it has only made a marginal contribution to Shelvoke and Drewry profits". Order books for the dustcart products were reported to be "nine months long".

Babcock & Wilcox began a bid for Butterfield-Harvey in mid 1977 declaring its main interest to be in Shelvoke and Drewry which then represented more than a third of Butterfield's activities. But the bid failed to proceed.

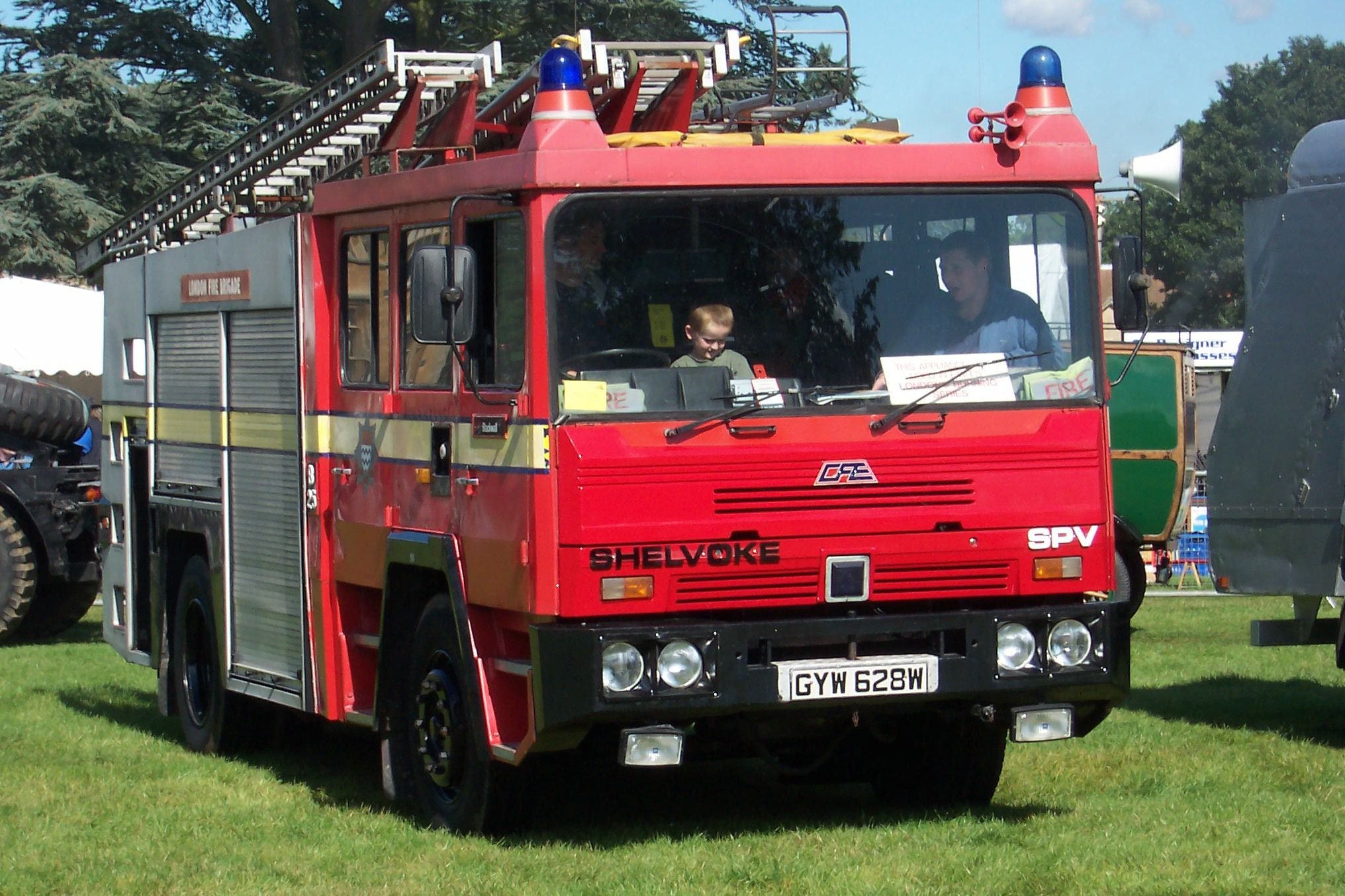
1980 WX fire engine, as featured on the TV series London's Burning.

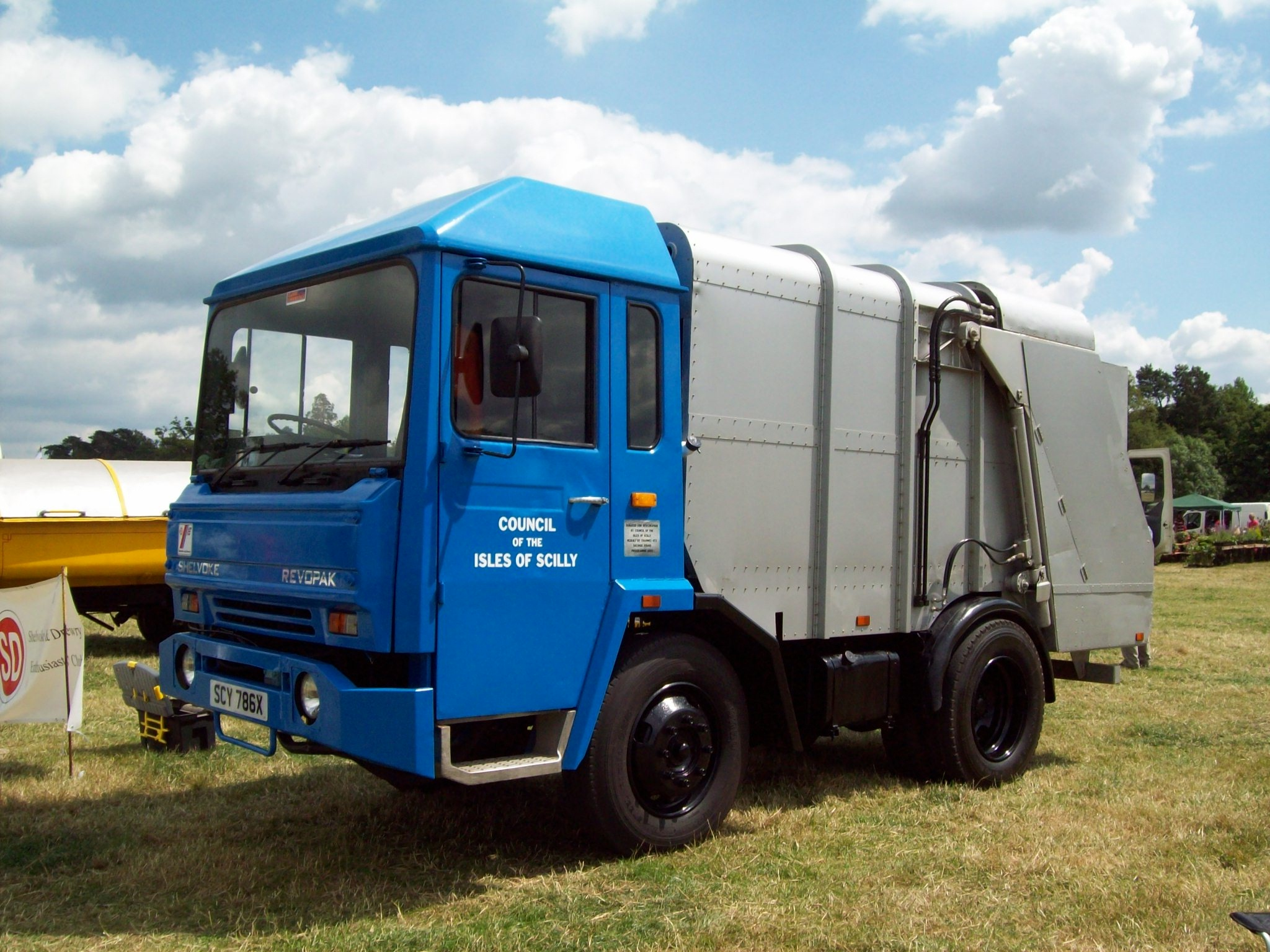
1982 P-Series Revopak dustcart

In the late 1970s, Shelvoke and Drewry went head-to-head with its arch-rival Dennis, and once-again began to manufacture fire engines through its newly established Special Purpose Vehicles (SPV) division. S&D had also collaborated with Dennis along with Ogle Design to develop a new common cab for both companies' product lines - this emerged as the P-Series in 1978. By the end of 1979 the chairman reported that Shelvoke and Drewry turned out about 1,000 vehicles each year. Dustcarts left the factory as finished products but fire and air crash tenders were fitted out, completed, by outside contractors. A quarter of municipal vehicles were exported and 85 per cent of the special purpose chassis were sent overseas.

Early in 1981 Shelvoke and Drewry were obliged to report they had made another 150 redundant having previously cut the jobs of over 300 employees. Remaining workers were on a three-day week and apprentices on a two-day week. The following year another 100 jobs were cut and factories were closed.

=== Shelvoke Dempster 1984 to 1990 ===
At the end of 1983 Butterfield was rescued by a short-term loan from an American investment company, Technology Incorporated. Butterfield was unable to raise alternative funds to make repayment and under the terms of the loan Technology Incorporated assumed control of Butterfield. Ownership was transferred to Shelvoke Dempster on 1 January 1984. Dempster Systems was an American subsidiary of Technology Incorporated.

Otherwise Shelvoke's circumstances did not change. Demand for dustcarts had not picked up again, Shelvoke was described as Butterfield's "running sore". One of the two Shelvoke factories was forced to close (160 jobs) and in-house component manufacture was contracted out.

The first new Shelvoke Dempster product, Dempster's Routechief intermittent rear loader, went into production at Letchworth. Shelvoke Dempster also distributed these American-made products: Routeking II rear loader, Dumpster front loader, Dinosaur and Dragon III roll-on and roll-off systems and Dempster Dumpster products. Established Shelvoke products like Revopak and the special-purpose vehicles remained in production at Letchworth. The Letchworth workforce was now 350 people.

Shelvoke Dempster was held by Krug International (UK) Limited, a British subsidiary of American investor Technology Incorporated. Krug closed down its Dempster factory in Knoxville, TX citing profitability issues. Krug then decided to wind up its industrial and engineering divisions and in the summer of 1989 announced it was keen to sell Shelvoke.

=== Shelvoke 1990 to 1991 ===
In mid 1990 there was a management buy-out of Shelvoke Dempster and Dempster was removed from the name of the business. Shelvoke's 194 employees were to be offered a share in the business.

=== Shutdown ===
However the new venture went into receivership in July 1991. The receivers sold the saleable activities and the remaining assets and design rights were bought by Dennis Eagle. About 70 Shelvoke staff were made redundant. Dennis Eagle expected the extra business would add about £2.5 million to turnover but no new Shelvoke designs would be made once current orders were filled. Parts and maintenance would be supplied for the remaining (2,000?) Shelvoke vehicles still operating. The Letchworth factory closed.

== Post mortem ==
Shelvoke's demise was attributed to a number of factors - for instance the deregulation of waste collection in the 1980s meant that many municipal authorities subcontracted this activity out to private companies. Their vehicles had traditionally been considerably more expensive than those of their competitors (largely due to their hand-built aluminium bodywork) and cost-conscious councils soon started investing in cheaper foreign vehicles. Shelvoke had also spent huge amounts trying to make money on the special purpose vehicles venture, and fought an increasingly futile battle with Dennis. They tenaciously stuck with their Revopak continuous loading system for waste collection vehicles, which, although effective, was more expensive to operate due to higher fuel consumption, and authorities looked for cost-saving intermittent-loading dustcarts instead. Dennis launched their Phoenix range of sweep/slide style refuse compactor dustcarts in 1979, which, with their lower operating costs, quickly eroded Shelvoke's market share.

Shelvoke and Drewry vehicles were still in service for many years after the demise of SD. For example, many fire engines were kept at small provincial airports, and many developing countries used ex-British second-hand refuse collection vehicles. Also many were kept in use until recently on the island of Malta. SD forklifts can still be found working across the uk and the rest of the world.

== See also ==
- Waste collection vehicle
- List of preserved Shelvoke and Drewry vehicles

== Bibliography ==
- s. n. (2002). An Anthology of the Worthing Tramocars. Crowborough: Southdown Enthusiasts Club.
- Kaleidoscope of Shelvoke and Drewry, Nick Baldwin & William Negus (1980)
- Municipal Refuse Collection Vehicles, Barrie C. Woods (2002) ISBN 0-9521070-4-X
