= List of preserved Shelvoke and Drewry vehicles =

Shelvoke & Drewry was a British manufacturer of specialised commercial vehicles. Founded in 1922 to produce the SD Freighter Shelvoke & Drewry ceased trading in 1991. It was best known for its innovative waste collection vehicles, which were once the preferred choice of municipal authorities in the UK. It also manufactured fire engines, buses and fork-lift trucks.

The company ceased trading in 1991, however a large number of S&D vehicles remain either in operational service or are in preservation in museums or by private individuals. Below is a listing of known preserved Shelvoke and Drewry vehicles.

Year	Reg. No.	Cab/Chassis	Body Type
1925	No Reg. No.	Freighter	Special for Works use
1927	KP 7670	Freighter	Side Loader
1929	MI 2721	Freighter	
1920/30	No Reg. No.	Freighter	Chassis only
1920/30	No Reg. No.	Freighter	Chassis only
1934	BPL 73	Freighter	Chelsea
1935	DPF 432	Freighter	Chelsea
1936	RD 8178	Freighter	Gully Emptier
	BP 9822	Freighter	Replica Tramocar
1937	JL 4881	Freighter MK II	Gully Emptier
1947	No Reg. No.	Freighter MK II	Chassis/cab only
	No Reg. No.	Freighter	
1947	JDE 512	Freighter	Chelsea type body
1946	ENJ 661	'W' Type	
1950/51	217159	'W' Type	Crash tender
1951	ZL 7761	'W' Type	Chelsea
1954	RVO 157	'W' Type	Now flat bed lorry
1958	78 DNK	'W' Type	Now with Derby body
1958	701 DUR	'W' Type	Cesspool Emptier
1959	HFA 908	'W' Type	
	YRE 367	'W' Type	Cesspool Emptier
1952	FVH 619	'W' Type	Tanker
1962	892 BWX	'T' Series	Former Pakamatic
1963	VTW 601E	'T' Series	Pakamatic
1964	251 BJD	'T’Series	Recovery vehicle
1967	HYD 719D	'T' Series	Tanker
1967	GKT 122D	'T' Series	Cesspool Emptier
1968 (Scrapped 2007)	~~LXE 51 E~~	'T' Series	Pakamatic
1971	GWJ 667J	'T' Series	F&A
1971	JNN 463K	'T' Series	
1971	JLY 162K	'T' Series	Tanker
1972	FBU 227K	'T' Series	Pakamatic
1972	OFT 983K	'T' Series	Now flat bed lorry
1972	KLK 464K	'T' Series	Gully Emptier
1974	RDM 639M	'T' Series	Cesspool Emptier
Scrapped 2007	~~507 ENV~~	'T' Series	F&A
1975	GJD 121N	'N' Series	Derby type
1974	GGV 547N	'N' Series	Revopak
1979	FCD 935V	'P' Series	Revopak
1980	EGZ 9390	'P' Series	Norba
1982	SCY 786X	'P' Series	Revopak
1984	A325 OMJ	'P' Series	Maxipak
Scrapped 2018	~~No Reg.~~	'P' Series	Norba
1986	D93 DAJ	'P' Series	Revopak
1991	OJI 2936	'P' Series	Flat bed body
1991	H680 BHS	'P' Series	ex RCV Chassis Cab
1976	RAB 498P	SPV	Carmichael Fire Tender
1979	YHV 186T	SPV	Pump Escape
1979	YHV 187T	SPV	Pump Escape
1981	GYW 614W	SPV	Pump ladder
1981	GYW 628W	SPV	Pump ladder
1981	GYW 631W	SPV	Pump ladder
1981	EBB 847W	SPV	Foam Tender
1981	ETN 909W	SPV	Emergency Tender
1982	ANO 169X	SPV	Turntable ladder

== Chassis Designations ==
From the start of production of the W Type each Vehicle was given a letter prefix at the start of their chassis number. The table below shows the know prefixes used and where known, the meaning. Some letters seem to have dropped once that item had become standard E.g. Air brakes

Prefix	Type	Description	GVW
W(1946–61)	W type	Steering Wheel	8.000 GVW
TW	W type	T type cab	
TN	T type	Narrow track	6.720 GVW
TBN	T type	Narrow Track -Air Brakes	6.720 GVW
TZ	T type		12.500 GVW
TBZ	T type	Air Brakes	12.500 GVW
TX	T type		13.760 GVW
TY	T type		16.260 GVW
TBY	T type	Air Brakes	16.260 GVW
TYR	T type	Power steering	16.260 GWV
NN	N type	T type cab	11.500 GVW
NNR	N type	T type cab-Power steering	11.500 GVW
NX	N type		14.000 GVW
NY	N type		16.000 GVW
NYR	N type	Power steering	16.000 GVW
NT	N type	Double drive	22.000 GVW
PN	P type	Narrow track	11.920 GVW
PNR	P type	Power steering	11.920 GVW
PNL	P type	Narrow – Long	12.500 GVW
PNL+	P type	Narrow- Long	13.500 GVW
PX	P type		14.230 GVW
PXR	P type	Power steering	14.230 GVW
PY	P type		16.000 GVW
PYR	P type	Power steering	16.000 GVW
PT	P Type	Double Drive	22.000 GVW

== SD Freighters ==
The SD Freighter was in production from the formation of Shelvoke & Drewry Ltd. in 1922 until the last Freighter was manufactured in 1955. Conceived as a light lorry the SD Freighter soon proved to be popular for refuse collection with its low loading height, small turning circle and simple control utilising two handles, known as "Tillers".

=== No Reg. No. ===
SD Freighter. Year of Manufacture: 1925 Original Owner: WH Allen, Bedford. Owner: Present Owner unknown. Location: Bedfordshire.

This Freighter was produced for WH Allen Sons & Co. of Bedford, manufacturers of marine and aero engines in 1925 who also operated a standard SD Freighter at this time. Modified to carry an amazing ten ton load the altered gear ratios restricted the Freighter to just 3 m.p.h. The front wheels were built up with wooden felloes and steel tyres whilst the oversize rear wheels were steel castings. The Freighter returned to Letchworth in the mid-1970s for retirement. A worthy working life of some 50 years.

=== KP 7670 ===
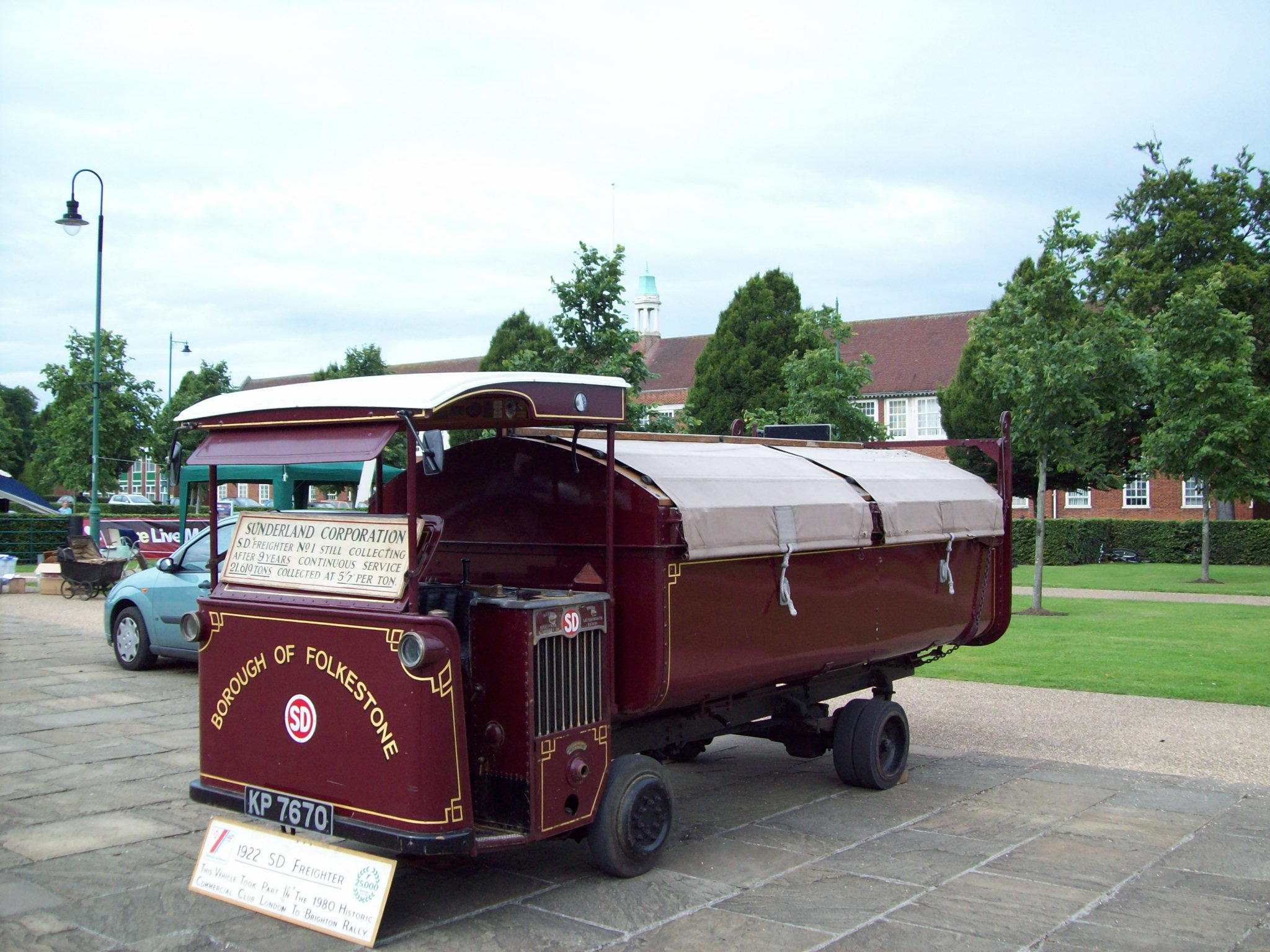
Preserved Shelvoke & Drewry Freighter Reg. No. KP 7670 restored to 1922 condition seen at the Letchworth Garden City Industrial Heritage Festival 1 August 2009.

SD Freighter. Year of Manufacture: 1927 Original Owner: Borough of Folkestone.

Custodian: Malcolm Bates. Location: Bedfordshire.

Started as a demonstrator in June 1927, sold in 1929 to Folkestone, used by them until 1946, then used as a sewer maintenance vehicle until 1966. Restored to 1922 condition by SD apprentices in 1968. (That year the 40 Club was formed for employees with 40 or more years service at the company). Became property of Dennis when S&D closed. With the Shuttleworth collection at Old Warden Bedfordshire, then Coventry Museum of Motor Transport until Malcolm Bates became custodian in the summer of 2003.

KP 7670 has appeared more than once on the HCVS Annual London to Brighton run.

The SD Freighter is driven using two tillers located to the left and right of the driver – one to control steering the other the gearbox – and two foot pedals – an accelerator and a brake.

=== MI 2721 ===
SD Freighter with flat bed body. Year of Manufacture: 1929 Original Owner: Pierce & Co., Co. Wexford, Ireland.

Owner: David Johnston. Location: Co. Cavan, Ireland.

This Freighter was used by Pierce & Co. for the transport of raw materials and finished farm machinery to and from the docks and railway station and was in use up to the 1960s. Then for a time it was owned by brewers Smithwick's of Kilkenny. It was then acquired by the An Dun Transport & Heritage Museum, near Athlone in Co. West Meath, Ireland. In October 2010 it was purchased by David Johnston and has been fully restored and re-painted in the livery of McCreath Taylor – Tar Importers.

=== No. Reg. No. ===
SD Freighter. Year of Manufacture: Believed to be 1920/30 Chassis Number: 012751 Original Owner: Possibly Kendal U.D.C. Owner: Present Owner Aled/Matt Rees (BRVC). Location: Bristol, UK

This Freighter chassis was purchased by its former owner in 2011 with the aim of restoration. Since around 1982 it had been in private hands in North East England. That owner had purchased it after it had been used for internal transport by Associated Lead Ltd of Newcastle upon Tyne. In 2016 it changed ownership again and as of 2020 is still awaiting restoration.

=== No. Reg. No. ===
SD Freighter. Year of Manufacture: Believed to be 1920/30 Original Owner: Possibly Whickham Council near Gateshead. Owner: Amberley Working Museum Location: Sussex, UK

This Freighter chassis was purchased by its present owner in 2011 for use as spares for the replica Tramocar Reg. No. BP 9822 at the Amberley Museum. Since around 1982 it had been in private hands in North East England. That owner had purchased it after it had been used for internal transport by Associated Lead Ltd of Newcastle upon Tyne.

=== BPL 73 ===
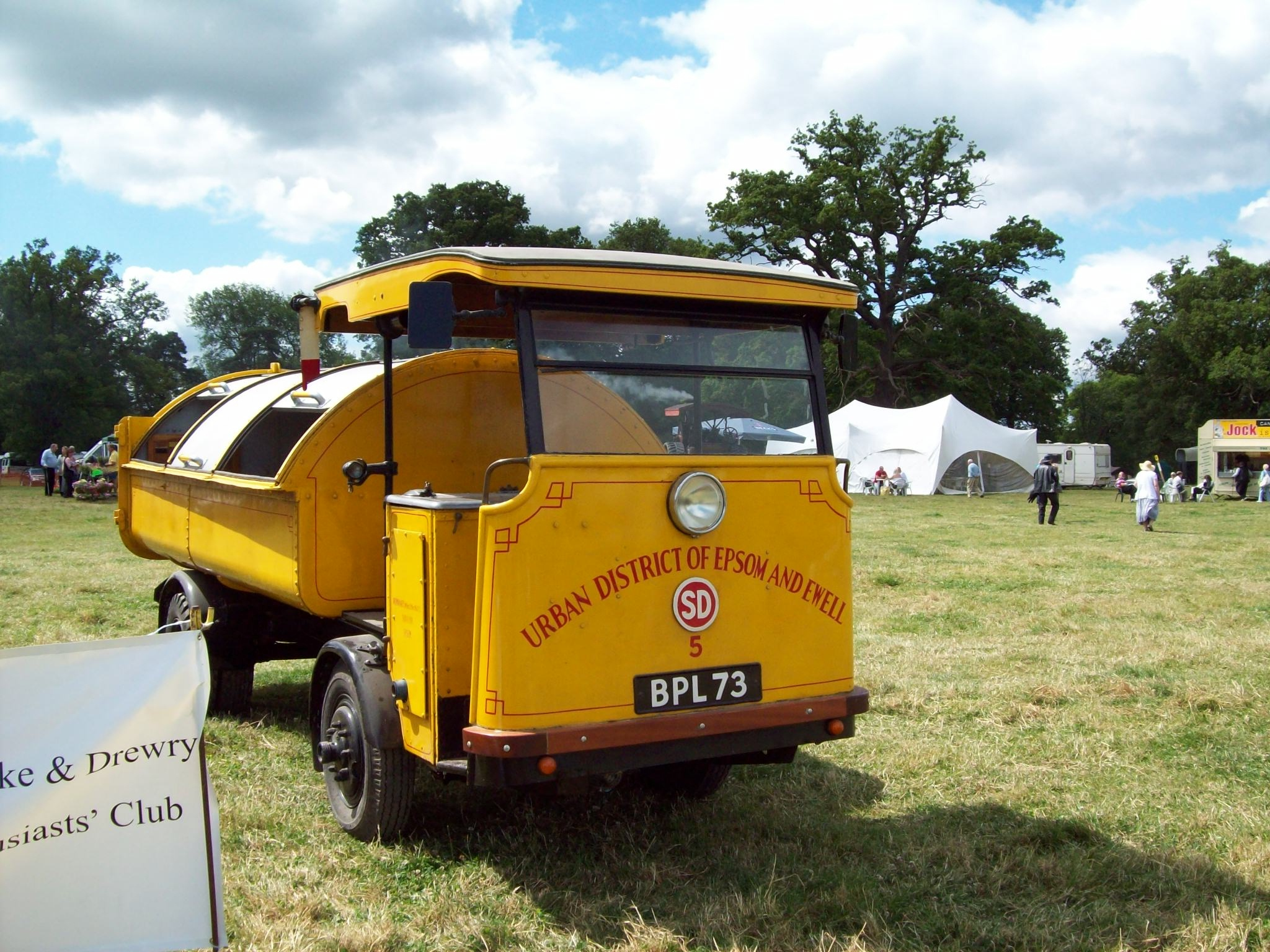
Preserved Shelvoke & Drewry Freighter Reg. No. BPL 73 ex-Epsom & Ewell seen at the SCHVPT Edenbridge Rally 20/21 June 2009.

SD Freighter with Chelsea type body. Year of Manufacture: 1934 Original Owner: Epsom & Ewell

Custodian: Southern Counties Historic Vehicles Preservation Trust (SCHVPT) Location: Sussex, UK When BPL 73 and her sister Freighter DPF 432 were withdrawn from service with Epsom & Ewell Council instead of making a final trip to the scrapyard they were stored by the council. Eventually the building they were stored in was to be demolished and one of the Freighters was offered to a group of enthusiasts from Worthing in the 1960s. This was long before the concept of preserving commercial vehicles had become established. The group is now known as the Southern Counties Historic Vehicle Preservation Trust who continue to care for this vehicle.

The Freighter has pneumatic tyres, accommodation for loaders including a fold down seat in the front compartment, and an electric headlamp. The Chelsea body is equipped with steel sliding shutters. BPL 73 has taken part in several HCVS London to Brighton runs and is regularly rallied. The Freighter appeared in the film version of Dad's Army. A photo of BPL 73 appears on the front cover of Barrie Woods book on Municipal Refuse Collection Vehicles.

=== DPF 432 ===
SD Freighter with Chelsea type body. Year of Manufacture: 1935 Original Owner: Epsom & Ewell

Owner: Russell Cook Location: Shropshire.

DPF 432 along with her sister Freighter BPL 73 was withdrawn from service with Epsom & Ewell Council but instead of making a final trip to the scrapyard was stored by the council. Eventually the building they were stored in was to be demolished. DPF 432 was in poorer condition than BPL 73 and passed into the hands of a private enthusiast. When restoration of the Freighter proved to be beyond this individual's resources he donated the vehicle to the East Anglia Transport Museum near Lowestoft with the intention that the Museum should undertake the restoration. There it remained in storage for many years un-restored and since the Museum is primarily interested in buses and trolleybuses in 2009 the decision was taken to dispose of the Freighter. In that year it passed into the hands of Russell Cook who intends to restore the Freighter to full working order.

=== RD 8178 ===
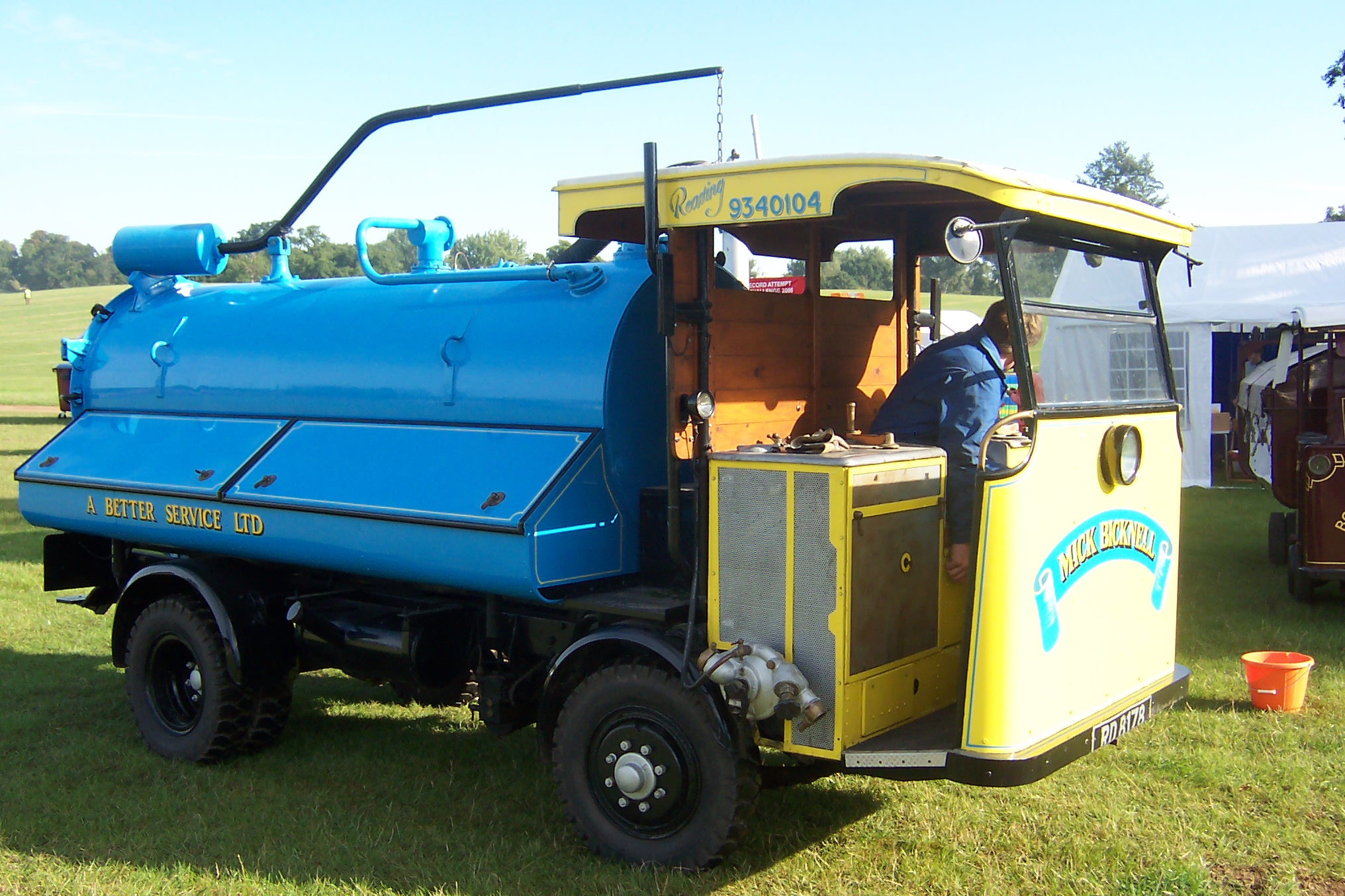
Shelvoke & Drewry Freighter Gully Emptier at Old Warden Steam Fair 2005. In Livery of Michael Bicknell.

SD Freighter Gully Emptier. Year of Manufacture: 1936 Original Owner: Reading Urban District Council.

Owner: Present Owner unknown. Until 2009: Michael Bicknell, Berkshire Location: Unknown.

Over the years many Councils purchased their gully emptiers and cesspool emptiers from Shelvoke & Drewry along with their refuse collection vehicles. This example from 1936 has pneumatic tyres and a windscreen but still very primitive weather protection for the driver.

In the July 2010 issue of Vintage Roadscene Magazine an article describes the vehicles designed for the disposal of liquid waste.

This was one of Mr. Bicknell's fleet of four SD's that moved on to a new owner in 2009.

=== BP 9822 ===
SD Freighter re-built as replica Tramocar. Year of Manufacture: 19?? Original Owner: City of Truro

Custodian: Amberley Working Museum Location: Sussex, UK

Around 50 SD Freighter chassis were fitted with bus type bodies and used at seaside resorts in the summer season. The largest operator was W.R. Gates who named the vehicles Tramocars and operated a fleet in Worthing from 1924 until the business was taken over by Southdown in 1938 who continued to run Tramocars until 1940. The Amberley Working Museum utilised an ex-City of Truro SD Freighter chassis to build a replica Tramocar which regularly carries visitors to the museum, and commemorates the Worthing Tramocar service. Contrary to an earlier entry the control pedals have NOT been moved and the accelerator is still in the middle with footbrake on the right and the gong on the left. David Kaye gives a full account of SD Freighters as buses in Buses Extra October–November 1987. The Southdown Enthusiasts' Club published an account of the Worthing Tramocars in 2002.

=== JL 4881 ===
SD Freighter Mk II Gully Emptier. Year of Manufacture: 1937 Original Owner: Unknown

Custodian:Veolia Ltd. Location: Durham.

This MK II Gully Emptier was restored by Cleanaway Ltd. and painted in their livery. The vehicle was discovered in a London scrapyard in the late 1980s by Cleanaway's fleet engineer. The complete refurbishment took over five years to complete. After the Second World War Purle Brothers had purchased the gully emptier when they were awarded septic tank emptying contracts around the London area. The vehicle has attended numerous rallies and appeared in the film "The End of the Affair" produced in 1999. In 2010 the vehicle is again undergoing restoration.

=== No Reg. No. ===
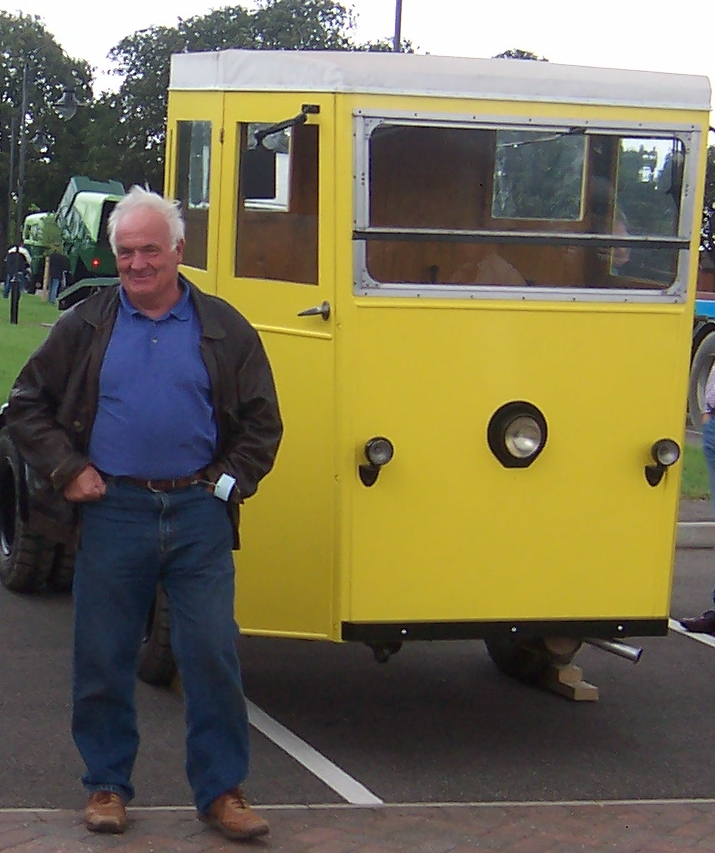
This SD Freighter MK II belonged to Michael Bicknell in 2003. It was shown at SD Remembered in September 2003.

SD Freighter MK II Chassis/cab only. Year of Manufacture: 1947 Original Owner: Unknown but in Kent.

Owner: Present Owner unknown. Until 2009: Michael Bicknell, Berkshire Location: Unknown.

The SD Freighter MK II had much improved weather protection for the driver as seen in this photo. Side lights in addition to the headlight were now provided. But as a post-war vehicle the Freighter was beginning to look very antiquated.

This was one of Mr. Bicknell's fleet of four SD's that moved on to a new owner in 2009.

=== No. Reg. No. ===
SD Freighter. Year of Manufacture: 19?? Original Owner: Brighton & Hove Owner: Present Owner unknown. Until 2009: Michael Bicknell, Berkshire Location: Unknown.

Believed to have been a moving floor type as this was the preferred option for Brighton & Hove. This was one of Mr. Bicknell's fleet of four SD's that moved on to a new owner in 2009.

=== JDE 512 ===
SD Freighter Mk II with Chelsea type body. Year of Manufacture: First Registered 21 December 1947 Original Owner: Unknown. Custodian: The National Museum of Wales. Location: Collections Centre at Nantgarw, just north of Cardiff.

A good example of a late manufacture SD Freighter typical of those supplied to numerous local authorities. Curious and dated though the vehicle may appear, but still in its time the preferred choice in many areas.

== SD 'W' Type. ==
The SD 'W' type was produced from 1946 until 1961 – total production 3,200 vehicles. The 'W' type had conventional controls and a timber framed cab and was offered with a variety of body types.

=== ENJ 661 ===
SD W type. Year of Manufacture: 1946

Original Owner: Unknown Owner: K. Hyndman Location: Sussex, UK

This one was reported around 2003. Does anyone know anything of this vehicle?

=== 217159 ===
SD W type Crash Tender Year of Manufacture: 1950/51

Original Owner: Royal Australian Air Force. Owner: R.A.A.F. Point Cook Museum. Location: Melbourne, Victoria, Australia.

The Australian Civil Aviation Department ordered ten SD 'W' types equipped as airfield crash tenders for delivery in 1950/51. It is Unknown whether this one is one of that batch or a separate order for the Air Force. Fitted with 1,100 gallon water tanks and a front sprinkler to clear spilt fuel and when fire fighting to keep flames clear of the vehicle. In 2010 the vehicle was restored at the museum and painted bright yellow.

=== ZL 7761 ===
SD W type with Chelsea body. Year of Manufacture: 1951

Original Owner: Dublin County Council. Owner: National Transport Museum, Dublin Location: Dublin

This vehicle was reported in 2003 as being in "very bad condition" and in storage off site. It was not anticipated that it would be restored for some time.

=== RVO 157 ===
SD W type now flat bed lorry. Year of Manufacture: 1954

Original Owner: Mansfield Council Owner: The Ellis family Location: Nottinghamshire, UK

Restored by Clive Ellis this 'W' type is now fitted with a flat bed lorry body. It is currently owned by Clive's daughter, Julia, and is frequently rallied in the Nottinghamshire area.

=== 78 DNK ===
SD W type now with Chelsea type body. Year of Manufacture: 1958

Original Owner: Ketton R.D.C. Owner: Michael Cooper Location: Ayrshire, Scotland

First Registered: 1 July 1958 Chassis No.: W58L468

This 'W' type has S&D's 3,620 cc side vale engine and after service with Ketton R.D. C. was with J & D Hadfield, a coach & haulage company, from about 1967 until 1977 when it was purchased by Ted Hoole from Sheffield. Converted to a flat bed lorry by Ted, and carrying an ex-railway box van body, which housed a fair ground organ, the SD was to be found at fairs and rallies in the summer months for 23 years until 2010. In Spring 2010 the vehicle was purchased by Michael Cooper who fitted a replica Chelsea type body and re-sprayed the vehicle.

=== 701 DUR ===
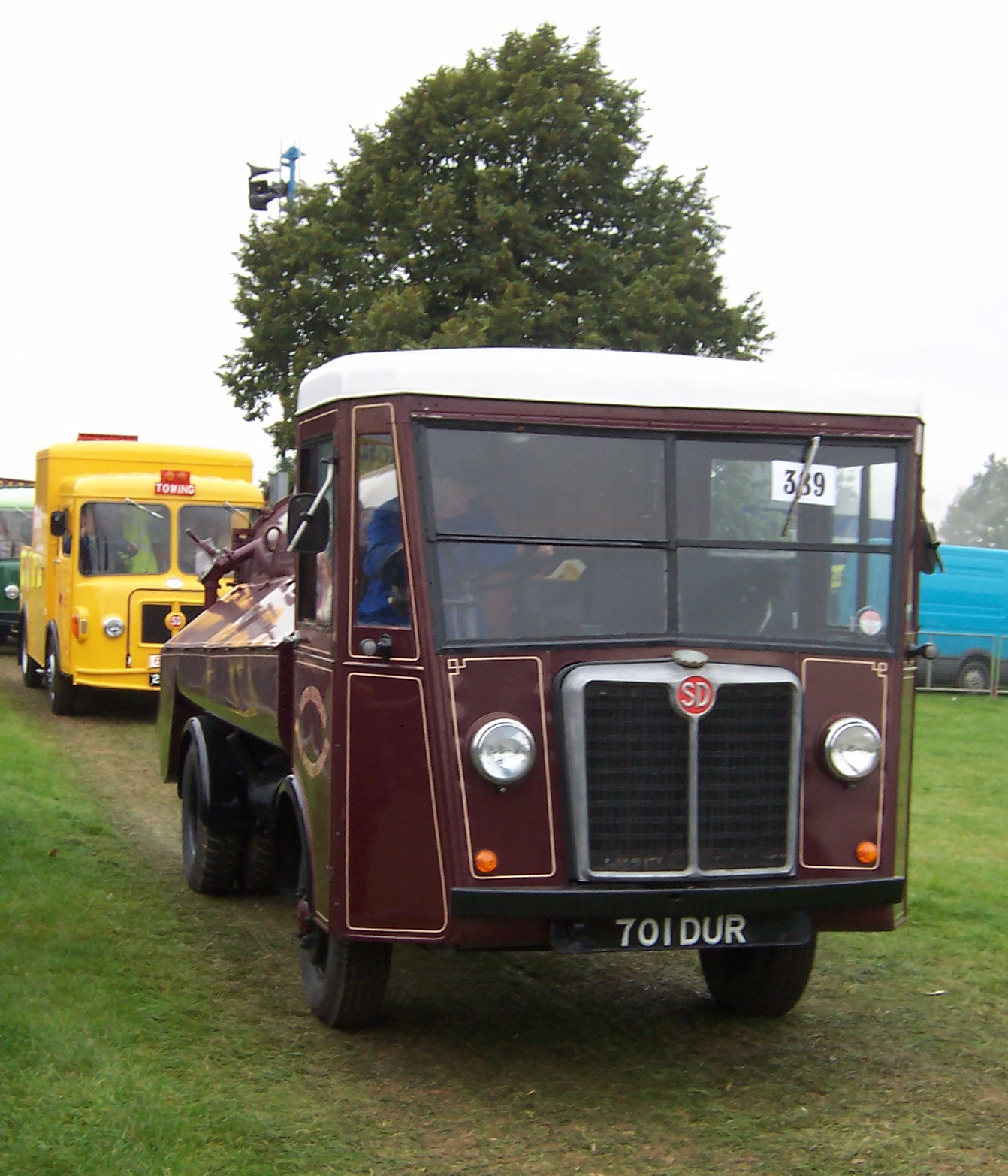
701 DUR 'W' type tanker seen at Old Warden Steam Fair Sunday 18 September 2005

SD W type tanker. Year of Manufacture: 1958

Original Owner: North Kesteven Council Owner: Unknown. Until 2009 with Michael Bicknell Location: Unknown

701 DURwas originally restored in Nottinghamshire in 2001 and was said to be '90% original' at that time. Shortly afterwards it was put up for sale and purchased by Michael Bicknell who cared for it until it was sold once more in 2009.

The vehicle is a cesspool emptier and equipped for collection of nightsoil. A description of these duties may be found in Vintage Roadscene Magazine July 2010 issue.

This was one of Mr. Bicknell's fleet of four SD's that moved on to a new owner in 2009.

=== HFA 708 ===
SD W type. Year of Manufacture: 1959

Original Owner: Burton on Trent Council Owner: S & B Dominic Location: Nottinghamshire, UK

This was reported in 2003 nothing further is known.

=== YRE 367 ===
SD W type Cesspool Emptier. Year of Manufacture: 1952

Original Owner: Unknown Owner: Jim Wakefield Location: Cambridgeshire

Purchased in 2004 and under restoration by the owner.

=== FVH 619 ===
SD W type tanker. Year of Manufacture: 1952

Original Owner: Huddersfield Council Owner: Jim Wakefield Location: Cambridgeshire

Purchased in 2005 and under restoration by the owner.

== SD 'T' Series. ==
The SD 'T' Series vehicles were in production from 1960 for ten years, and featured the last cab to be completely designed and manufactured in-house by the company. This series was designed to take advantage of the increased permitted gross vehicle weight and utilised a fibreglass front panel and roof mounted on a wooden framed cab. 'T'-Series chassis were used with many different body types, the most common being SD's own Pakamatic and later Revopak.

=== 892 BWX ===
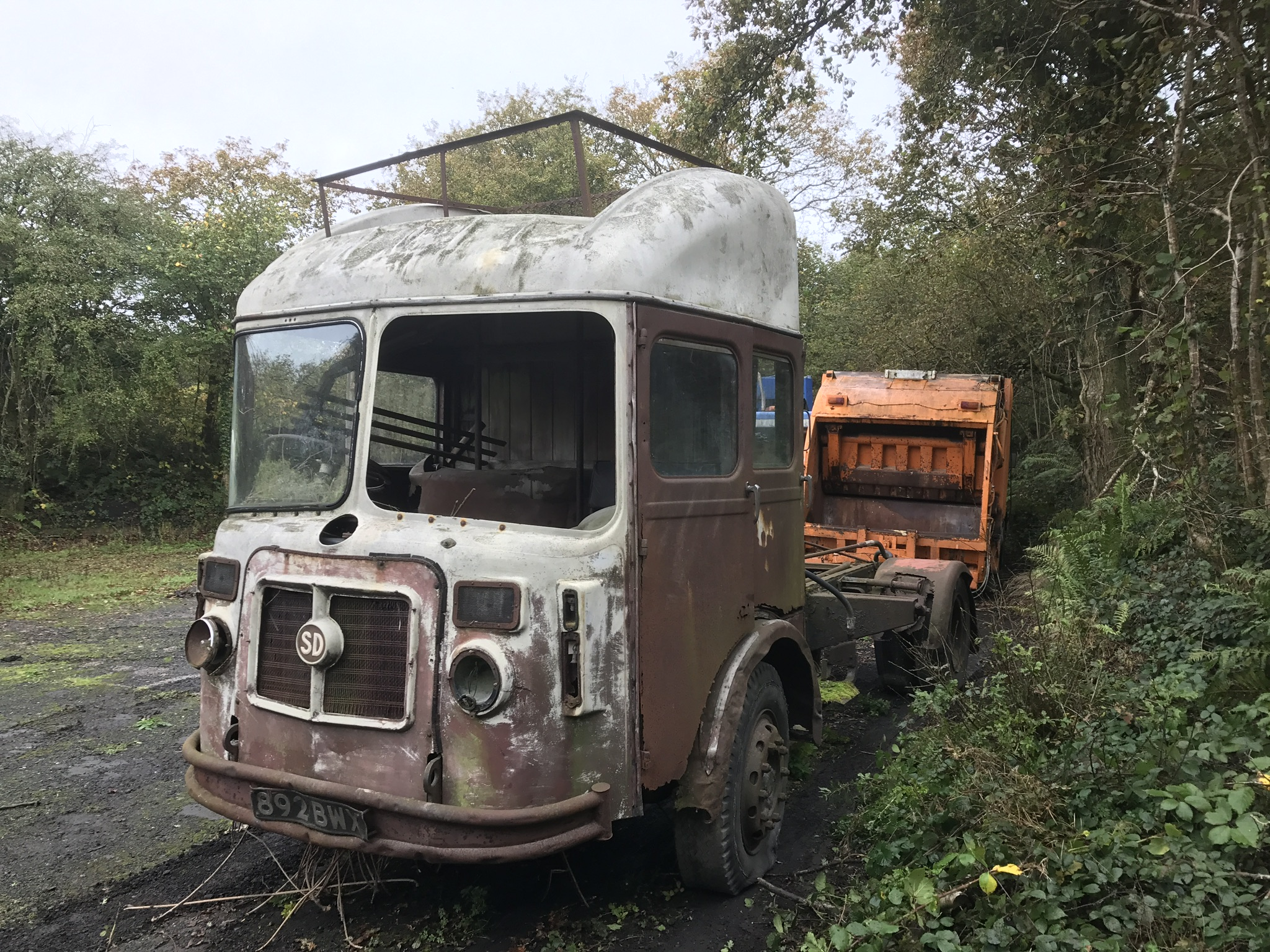
892 BWX seen awaiting restoration in 2017

SD TY Ex Pakamatic Year of Manufacture: 1962

Original Owner: Knaresbrough BC Owner: Aled/Matt Rees (BRVC) Location: Bristol, UK

893 BWX was discovered at the back of a former Harogate truck breakers yard in 2017 by the current owners. The Pakamatic was bought from Knaresbrough Council in 1968 having its aluminium body and gearbox removed shortly after. As of 2020 it is awaiting significant restoration. 893 BWX is thought to be the oldest surviving T Series and the only extent TY.

=== VTW 601E ===
SD TN Pakamatic Year of Manufacture: 1963

Chassis No. TN632

Original Owner: Unknown Owner: Unknown Location: Unknown

VTW 601E is the second TN built in 1963 as shown by its short chassis number. Pictures of this Pakamatic were posted on social media in 2016. The pictures showed the vehicle in good unrestored condition. The TN was in dry storage at that time.

=== 251 BJD ===
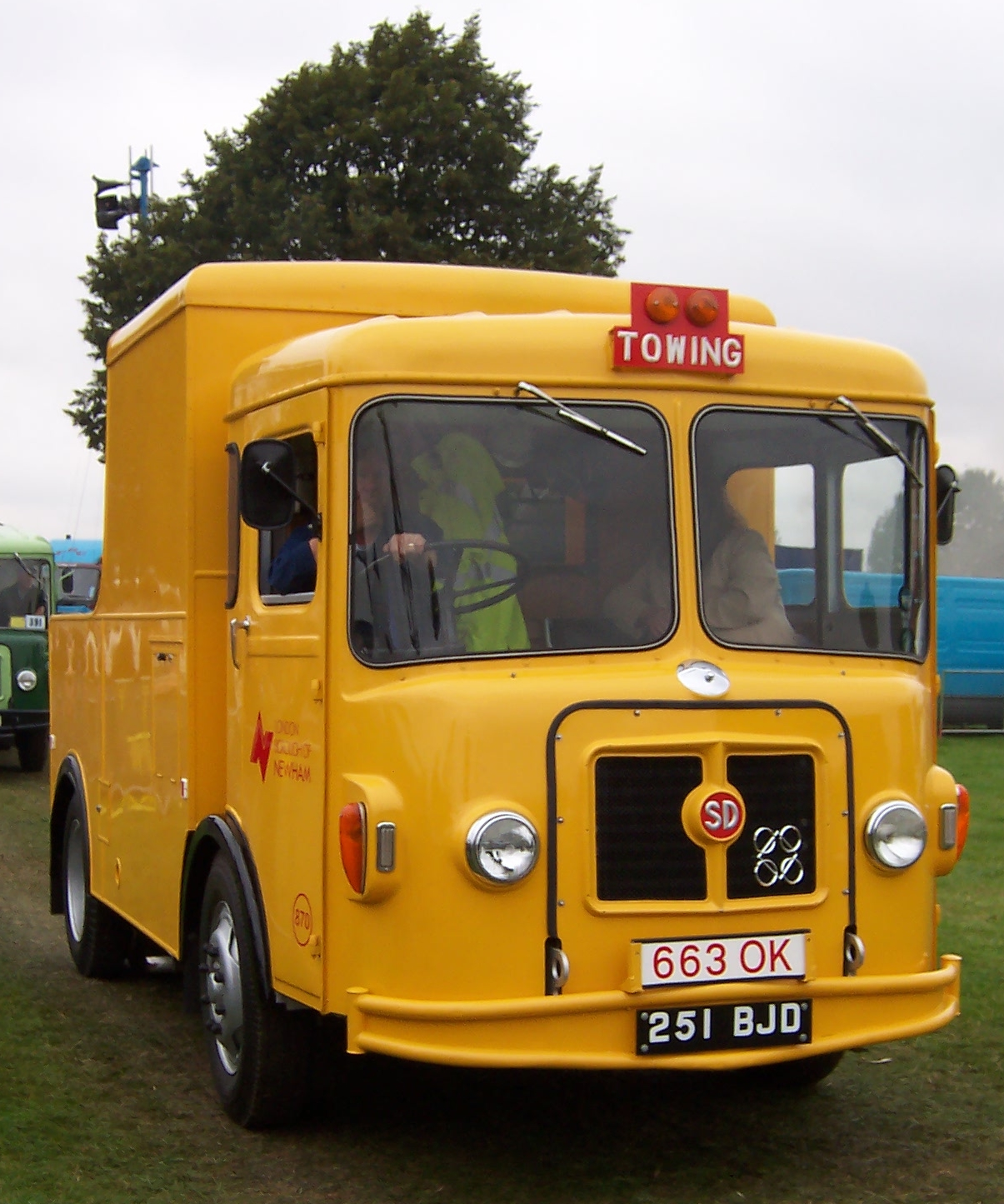
251 BJD Ex-London Borough of Newham Recovery Vehicle seen at Old Warden Steam Fair Sunday 18 September 2005

SD TZ Recovery Vehicle. Year of Manufacture: 1964

Chassis No. TZ64136

Original Owner: London Borough of West Ham which became the London Borough of Newham

Owner: Aled/Matt Rees (BRVC) Location: Bristol, UK

In 1961 the County Borough of West Ham in London purchased two S&D TZ vehicles equipped for flushing out sewers and drains and for street washing. 251 BJD was one of this pair. In 1965 local government reorganisation resulted in the vehicles belonging to the newly created London Borough of Newham. The vehicles' system of sewer flushing became obsolete and they were converted to recovery vehicles by fitting a new body and a Harvey-Frost 5 ton crane. By the mid-1980s the vehicles were considered to be too old and too slow for recovery work and 251 BJD was stored at the Borough's museum with a view to being restored. Financial restraints prevented this action and the vehicle was sold to Clive MacDonald in 1999.

Clive carried out a full restoration and re-painted the vehicle in Highway Yellow. The vehicle has been rallied extensively and was awarded first in its class at the 2004 Classic Commercial Motor Show at Gaydon. It has taken part in the HCVS London to Brighton run where again it was awarded first in its class.

A full account of the restoration may be found in Classic & Vintage Commercials Magazine January 2006.

251BJD was sold to Aled & Matt Rees in 2019 and is looked after by British Refuse Vehicle Collection.

=== HYD 719 D ===
SD T type tanker. Year of Manufacture: 1966

Original Owner: Unknown Owner: SKF Ltd. Location: Luton

Strictly speaking not a 'preserved vehicle.' This tanker may still be in regular use for disposing liquid waste.

=== GKT 122 D ===
SD T type Cesspool Emptier. Year of Manufacture: 1966

Original Owner: Unknown Owner: Brian Crust Location: Kent

This vehicle offered for sale June 2009.

=== LXE 51 E ===
SD TN Pakamatic. Year of Manufacture: 1967

Original Owner: Luton Council Owner: London Recycling Location: East London

Purchased from Rush Green Motors with a view to restoration and use for collection of material for waste recycling. LXE 51E was last seen in 2004 and thought to have been broken up two years later

=== GWJ 667 J ===
SD TBN Fore & Aft Tipper. Year of Manufacture: 1970

Original Owner: City of Sheffield Owner: City of SheffieldLocation: Sheffield, South Yorkshire.

Restored to full working order by Sheffield City Council in the 1990s. The Fore & Aft tipper was based on a Faun design and was an early solution to the decreased density of refuse requiring some means of compaction. In this design the vehicle's body could be tipped forwards to allow the weight of the refuse to compress the load. Rearward tipping discharged the load. On later models as GWJ 667 J a hydraulically operated plate secured to the roof of the body gave extra compaction when tipped forwards. This device was known as a Powerpress. The Sheffield version is a narrow bodied model designed for use in narrow streets.

=== JLY 162 K ===
SD TN type tanker. Year of Manufacture: 1971, first registered 1 June 1972

Original Owner: BP Heating Oils Owner: Ian Wyngarde Location: Swansea, Wales

In 1971 S&D supplied some TN 1,200 gallon tankers to BP for delivering domestic heating fuel oil in London. With its 6 ft. 6 ins. width and high manoeuvrability the tanker was ideal for this purpose. Considerable difficulty was experienced in reducing engine noise in the cab, which whilst acceptable on refuse collection work, was deemed by the customer to be excessive when delivering central heating oil.

Ian Wyngarde purchased this vehicle in the summer of 2009. It was first registered to Shell Mex. In 1979 it was acquired by Donovan Oils at Bethnal Green and used to deliver paraffin and heating oil. Withdrawn from service in the mid-1980s the tank was used to store red diesel oil until the vehicle was offered for sale.

A picture of the vehicle as new appears in Kaleidoscope of Shelvoke & Drewry Caption 163. The vehicle is under restoration by the owner.

=== FBU 227 K ===
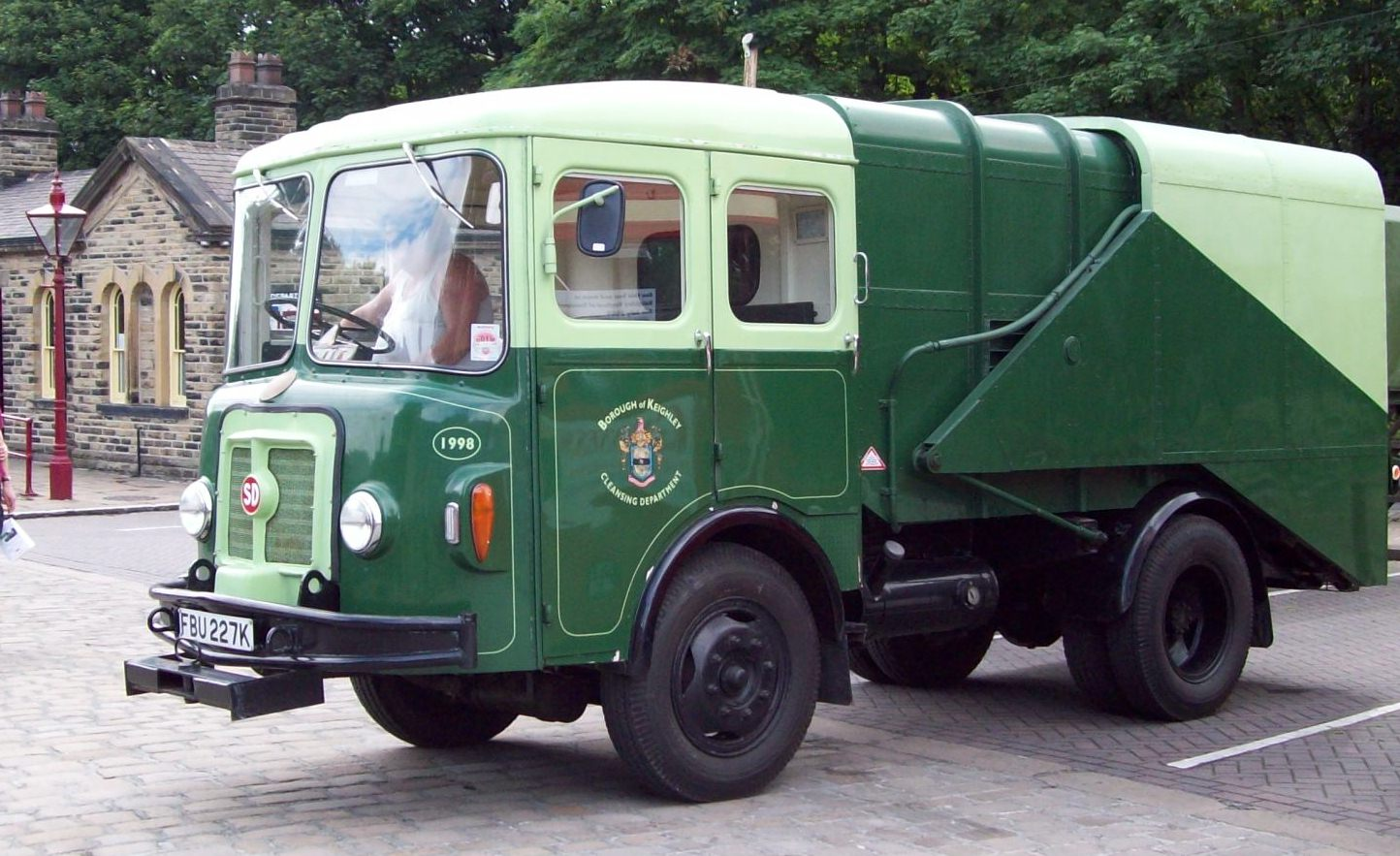
A Shelvoke & Drewry TBN Pakamatic Reg. No. FBU 227 K at the Keighley Festival of Transport 5 July 2009

SD TBN Pakamatic. Year of Manufacture: 1972 Chassis No.: TBN 72807

Original Owner: Oldham Borough Council Owner: Bradford Metropolitan Borough Council Location: West Yorkshire

This vehicle was first registered by Oldham Borough Council on 4 February 1972 and was in service for 16 years. It was purchased from a scrapyard in November 1997 and restored as a training exercise by the City of Bradford Metropolitan Council. Completed in February 199 having taken 2,100 hours to restore. The Project Co-ordinator was Terry Pycroft and the Project Leader Allen Freer. A full account of the restoration appeared in a series of articles in Classic & Vintage Commercials Magazine.

The Pakamatic was introduced in 1959 and utilised an aluminium alloy body which was left un-painted. A single reciprocating packer plate compacted the refuse which was discharged by rearward tipping of the body. The design was by Fernand Rey and was produced under licence to Semat-Rey of France. The Pakamatic proved to be highly popular with customers. The 'N designation denotes a narrow bodied vehicle.

FBU 227 K has been extensively rallied and was awarded first in class at the 1999 and 2000 London to Brighton runs.

=== OTF 983 K ===
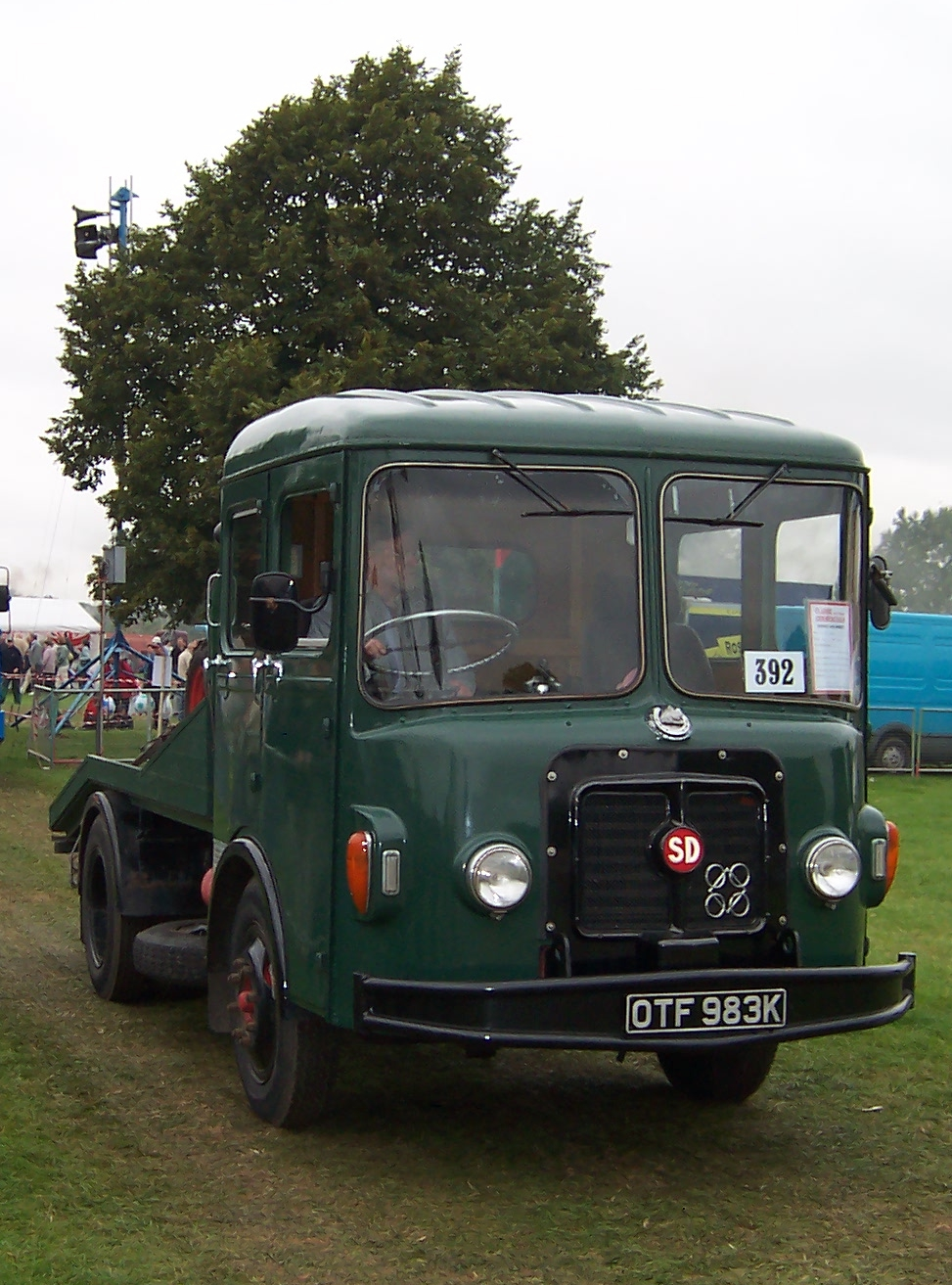
Shelvoke & Drewry TBN vehicle seen at Old Warden Steam Fair September 2005.

SD TBN now beaver tail lorry. Year of Manufacture: 1972

Original Owner: Bacup Council, first registered with Lancashire County Council local taxation office on 3 July 1972 Owner: Unknown Location: Unknown

Purchased by David Jones in 1998 and converted to a beavertail lorry used for taking the owner's vintage tractors to displays and rallies this vehicle was in service with Bacup Council. Sold at Cheffins of Cambridge Auction on 27 April 2013 to an undisclosed purchaser.

Shelvoke & Drewry's 'T' type superseded the 'W' type and incorporated a fibreglass front and roof to the timber framed coach built cab. The vehicles were powered by Perkins six cylinder diesel engines.

=== KLK 464 K ===
SD TBZ type Gully Emptier. Year of Manufacture: 1972 Chassis No. TBZ721948

Original Owner: Unknown Owner: Unknown Location: Barking, East London First Registered: 4 March 1972

This vehicle was seen in East London in May 2009. It appeared to be in reasonable condition. Nothing further is known. A V5 Log Book was issued for this vehicle in 2019.

=== RDW 639 M ===
SD T type Cesspool Emptier. Year of Manufacture: 1973

Original Owner: Newport Borough Council Owner: Unknown Location: Unknown

This vehicle was used by Evesham Marina for pumping sewage from their hire boats. It was withdrawn in 2003 and sold for restoration. Since then it has been advertised for sale but nothing further is known.

=== 507 ENV ===
SD T type Fore & Aft Tipper. Year of Manufacture: 1963

Original Owner: Kettering R.D.C. Owner: None Location: Scrapped

This vehicle stood at Stilton Cambridgeshire for many years. Visually it appeared to be in a reasonable condition. Around 2007 it was moved by its owner, placed for sale. This vehicle was scrapped shortly after.

== SD 'N' Series. ==
The SD 'N' series were introduced in 1972 and in production until 1978, and was the first SD vehicle to use a non-bespoke cab design from an outside supplier. The cab's basic architecture was from Motor Panels Ltd (and shares similarities with cabs used in Seddon Atkinson and Scammell trucks of the period), but with various alterations to make it suitable for municipal use. The majority of 'N' series chassis were built with Revopak refuse bodies, although SD's later Maxipak and Intapak bodies were also used with the N-series. They were also occasionally used with third-party refuse bodies from Laird and Jack Allen/Heil. A very small number of these vehicles are still in operation on the island of Malta, however detailed information on their original operator and current status has yet to be compiled. It is thought that there may be just one or two remaining active in 2020.

The N-series (with Revopak body) was immortalised as a Corgi model which remains in production to the present day.

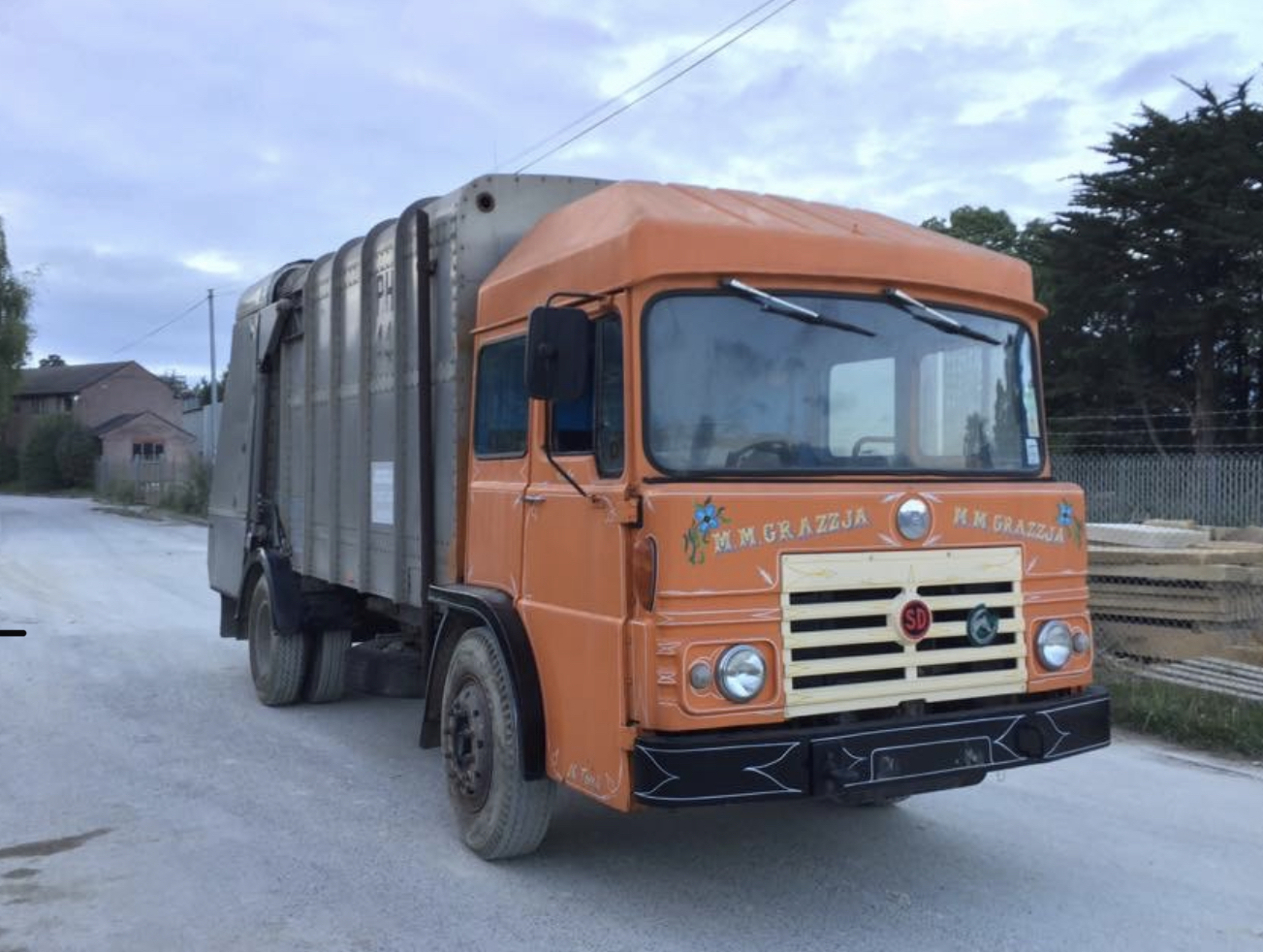
GGV 547N seen here in Bristol shortly after arriving from Malta in 2016

=== GGV 547N ===
SD NY Type Revopak. Year of Manufacture: 1974

Original Owner: Unknown

Owner: Aled/Matt Rees (BRVC) Location: Bristol, UK

GGV 547N was returned from Malta in 2015 by the current owners. It is thought to be the sole surviving NY in the UK.

=== GJD 121 N ===
SD TBN

type tanker now fitted with Derby type body. Year of Manufacture: 1974

Original Owner: BP Heating Oils Owner: McCreath Taylor (N.I.)Ltd. Location: Lisburn, Northern Ireland.

In 1971 S&D supplied some TN 1,200 gallon tankers to BP for delivering domestic heating fuel oil in London. With its 6 ft. 6 ins. width and high manoeuvrability the tanker was ideal for this purpose. In 1972 Shelvoke & Drewry's 'T' type was replaced by the 'N' type but the narrow bodied versions still utilised the fibreglass fronted cab from the 'T's. Therefore, this vehicle is probably an 'NN'.

It is known that following service with BP Oils GJD 121 N was in service in the mid to late 1980s with Premier Travel of Cambridge who used it as a fuel bowser. In 2006 it was being offered for sale. The body was missing and generally the vehicle appeared to be in a sorry state. But it was purchased by Michael Cooper from Ayrshire, Scotland, in 2007 and fully restored by June 2008 and a replica Derby type body was fitted. GJD 121 N was sold to McReath Taylor Ltd. in 2010.

An N-series Revopak briefly appears in the original closing credits of the British TV series Minder, and stars in an episode of the 1980s police drama Dempsey and Makepeace.

== SD 'P' Series. ==
From 1978 the SD 'P' series replaced the 'N' series and remained in production until Shelvoke & Drewry closed in 1991. The pressed steel cab design was shared with Dennis (who marketed it as the 'Dennis Delta' and has slightly different styling from the S&D version), and done in collaboration with Ogle Design, and was developed to be manufactured without the use of expensive press tools which would have otherwise made the cab uneconomic to build given Dennis and S&D's low production volumes. These types were normally sold with an in-house SD or Dempster refuse body (e.g. Revopak, Maxipak, Routechief), but as with the N-Series before it S&D also supplied it as chassis-only for the mounting of third party coachwork. Amongst others, P-Series chassis could be seen fitted with Norba, Laird (Shark/Rotopress) or Jack Allen/Heil (Colectomatic III) refuse bodies in the 1980s.

=== FCD 935V ===
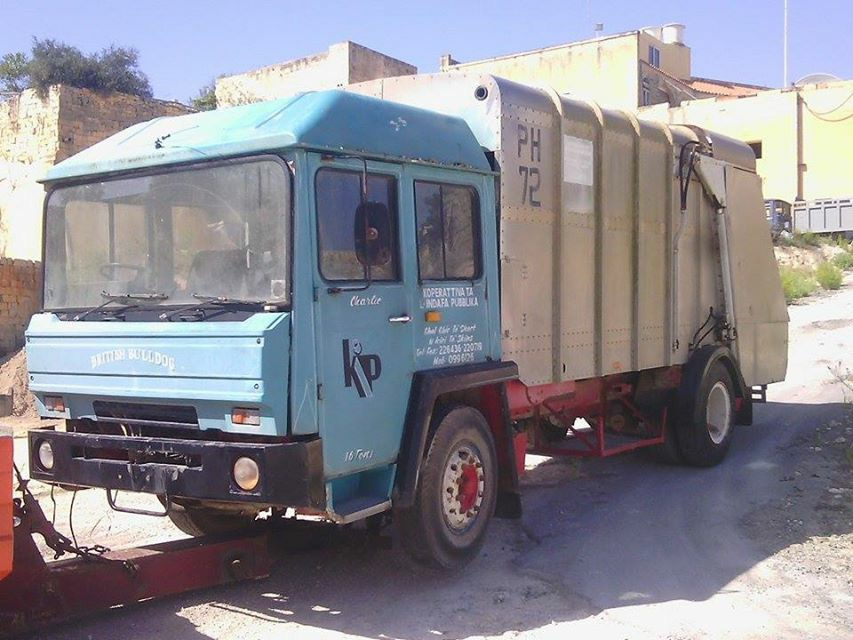
SD PY Revopak FCD935V seen here starting its journey back to the UK from Malta

SD PY type Revopak. Year of Manufacture: 1979

Original Owner: Unknown Owner: Aled/Matt Rees (BRVC) Location: Bristol, UK

FCD 935V is thought to be the only known surviving PY Revopak in the UK. It was returned to the UK in 2019 from Malta along with A325 OMJ, a Shelvoke Dempster PY Maxipak.

=== SCY 786 X ===
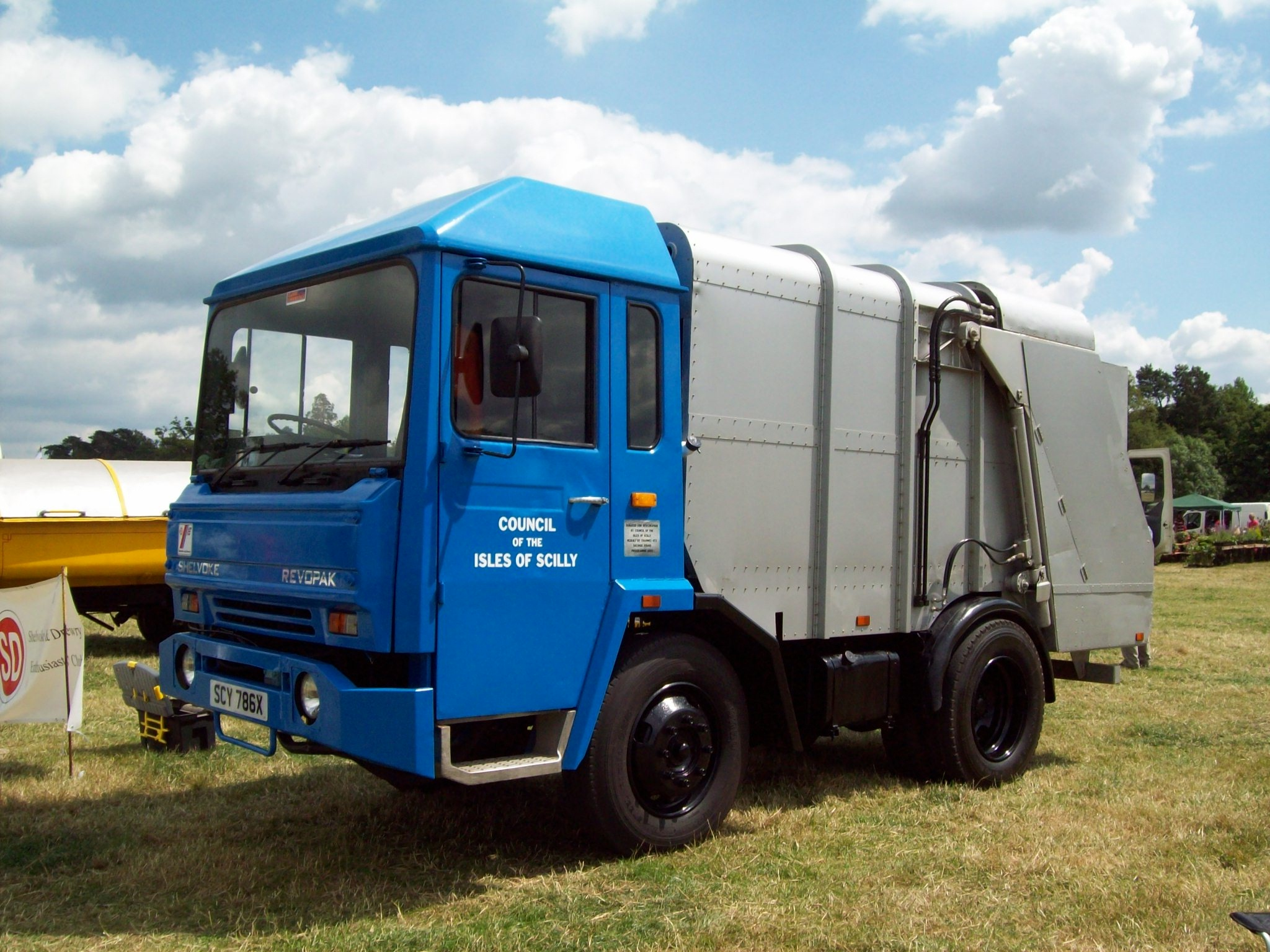
Preserved Shelvoke & Drewry PNL Revopak Reg. No. SCY 786 X seen at the SCHVPT Edenbridge Rally 20/21 June 2009.

SD PN Revopak. Year of Manufacture: 1982

Original Owner: Isles of Scilly

Owner: Steve Jones Location: Isle of Wight.

SCY 786 X is an SD PN Revopak. It was purchased new by the Isles of Scilly Council in 1982. The 'N' denotes that it is a narrow bodied vehicle (just 6 ft. 8 ins. wide) suited to the narrow streets of St. Mary's. The body is the shortest available at 9 cu. yds. capacity giving an overall length of 19 ft. 7 ½ ins. The vehicle gave good service on the island but required a replacement cab as the atmosphere on the Isles of Scilly is heavily salt laden.

After the vehicle was retired from service, it was left to decay in a scrapyard before being donated to Steve Jones from the Isle of Wight. In 2002 Wall to Wall Television decided to restore this vehicle for a film to be shown in the 'Salvage Squad' series on Channel 4 Television. Parts from another SD PN Revopak were used in the restoration including the cab, the complete tailgate with its compacting mechanism and the discharge ram. The programme was first broadcast on 27 January 2003. Since then the vehicle has been frequently rallied by Steve Jones and has twice re-visited the Letchworth area where it was built.

=== No Reg. No. ===
SD P type Norba. Year of Manufacture: 19??

Original Owner: Unknown Owner: National Transport Museum, Dublin Location: Dublin

This vehicle was acquired to replace a Revopak (Reg. No. OZG 634 ex-Dublin Coprporation) destroyed by fire at the museum. It was reported in 2003 that although the vehicle was running it needed a good deal of work. This example was sent for scrap in 2018.

=== EGZ9390 ===
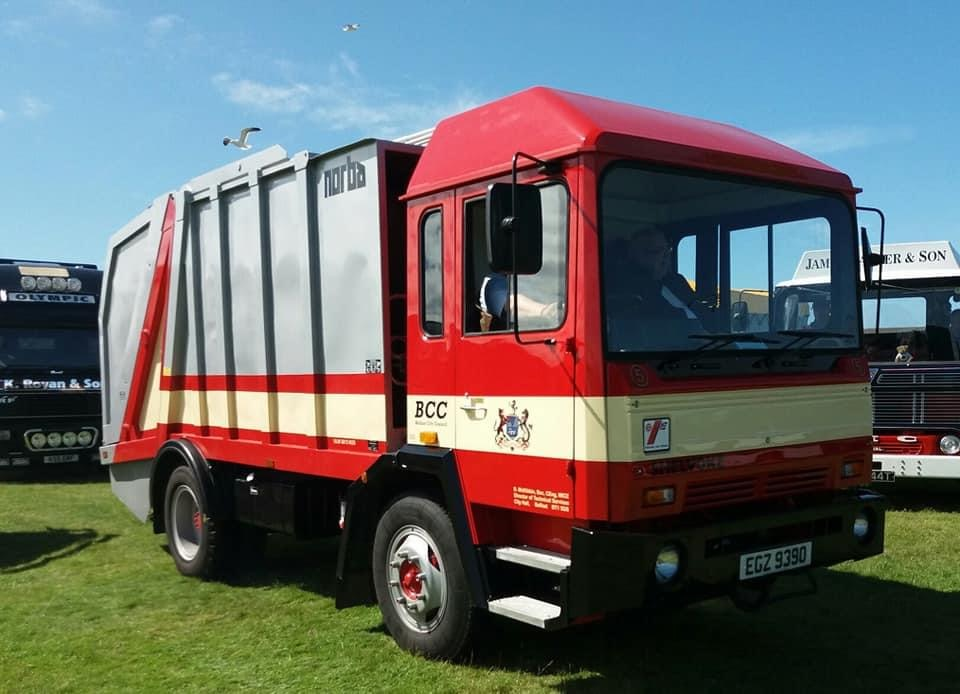
SD PN Norba RCV in Belfast City livery

SD P-Series with Norba KI-11 body. Year of Manufacture: 1980 Chassis number: PN80672 Original Owner: Unknown Owner: Peter Johnson Location: Belfast

This PN was one of three P type SDs that were dry stored on the Isle of Man when Magee Haulage ceased operations. They were bought by Peter Johnson and EGZ9390 was restored to the livery of Belfast City in 2017

=== A325 OMJ ===
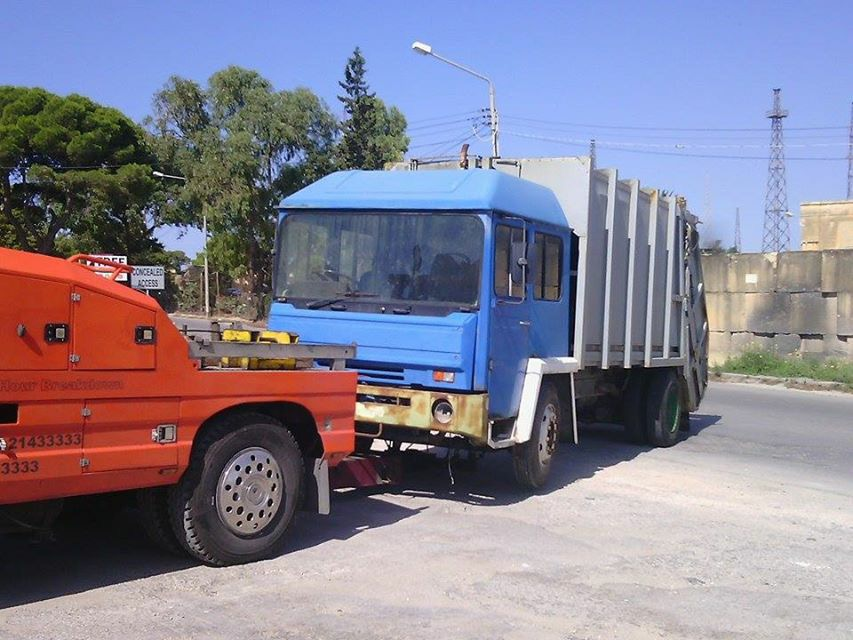
A325OMJ leaves Malta bound for the UK

SD PY type. Maxipak Year of Manufacture: 1984

Original Owner: Unknown

Owner: Aled/Matt Rees (BRVC) Location: Bristol, UK

This Vehicle was returned from Malta in 2019 along with a 1979 P Series Revopak. It carries the later style Maxipak body.

=== D 93 DAJ ===
SD PNL+ Revopak. Year of Manufacture: 1986

Original Owner: Blackpool Corporation

Owner: Steve Jones Location: Isle of Wight.

This Revopak has an 18 cu. yds. capacity body compared to SCY 786 X's 9 cu. yds. Overall width of the vehicle is 8 ft 0 ins. compared to the PN's 6 ft 8 ins.

=== OJI 2936 ===
SD PT type now with flat bed body. Year of Manufacture: 1991

Original Owner: Omagh District Council.

Owner: Peter Johnston. Location: Lisburn, Northern Ireland.

This vehicle was among the very last SD's built. After service with Omagh District Council it was sold at auction in September 1998 and eventually acquired by James McAleer of Fintona, Co. Tyrone who converted it to a recovery vehicle for commercial vehicles. This included removing the rear bogie, the automatic gearbox was replaced by a manual box and a new rear axle was fitted. After many years the vehicle was bought by Peter Johnston in July 2010 and fitted with a beavertail body so that it can be used to transport preserved vehicles. At that time the vehicle had recorded just 35,000 miles.

=== H680 BHS ===
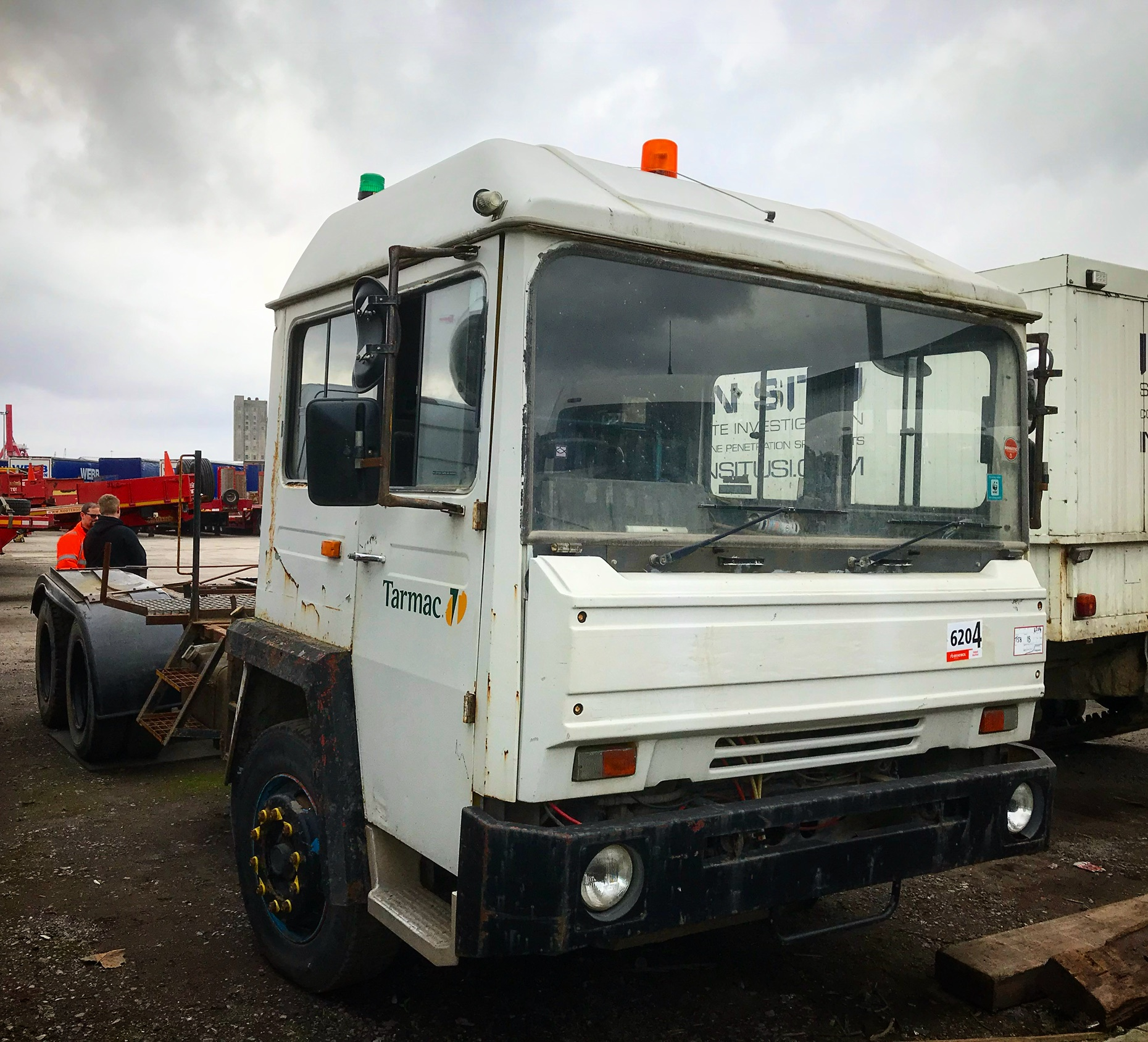
Shelvoke PT H680BHS seen here in 2019 at the Avonmouth depot of Kings Heavy Haulage awaiting onward transport.

SD PT type. Year of Manufacture: 1991

Original Owner: Unknown Owner: Aled/Matt Rees (BRVC) Location: Bristol, UK

This PT was acquired at an auction held in 2018, by the current owners. It is believed that its last use before sale was to carry a dust suppression tank or fuel bowser in a quarry. H680 BHS carries a Glasgow registration suffix but it is unclear who the initial owner was - although Glasgow City Council was a major S&D customer throughout the company's existence. It would have originally carried a Shelvoke Dempster, Routechief or Revopak body.

== SPV ==
The Special Purpose Vehicle (SPV) Division was formed in 1975 after Shelvoke & Drewry ceased to produce fork lift trucks. A wide range of specialised vehicles was developed including fire appliances and airport service vehicles. SD fire appliances for the most part used a version of the P-Series Ogle cab, although some used custom Carmichael cabs. Some SPV products made use of a generic Motor Panels cab design shared with Foden.

=== RAB 498 P ===
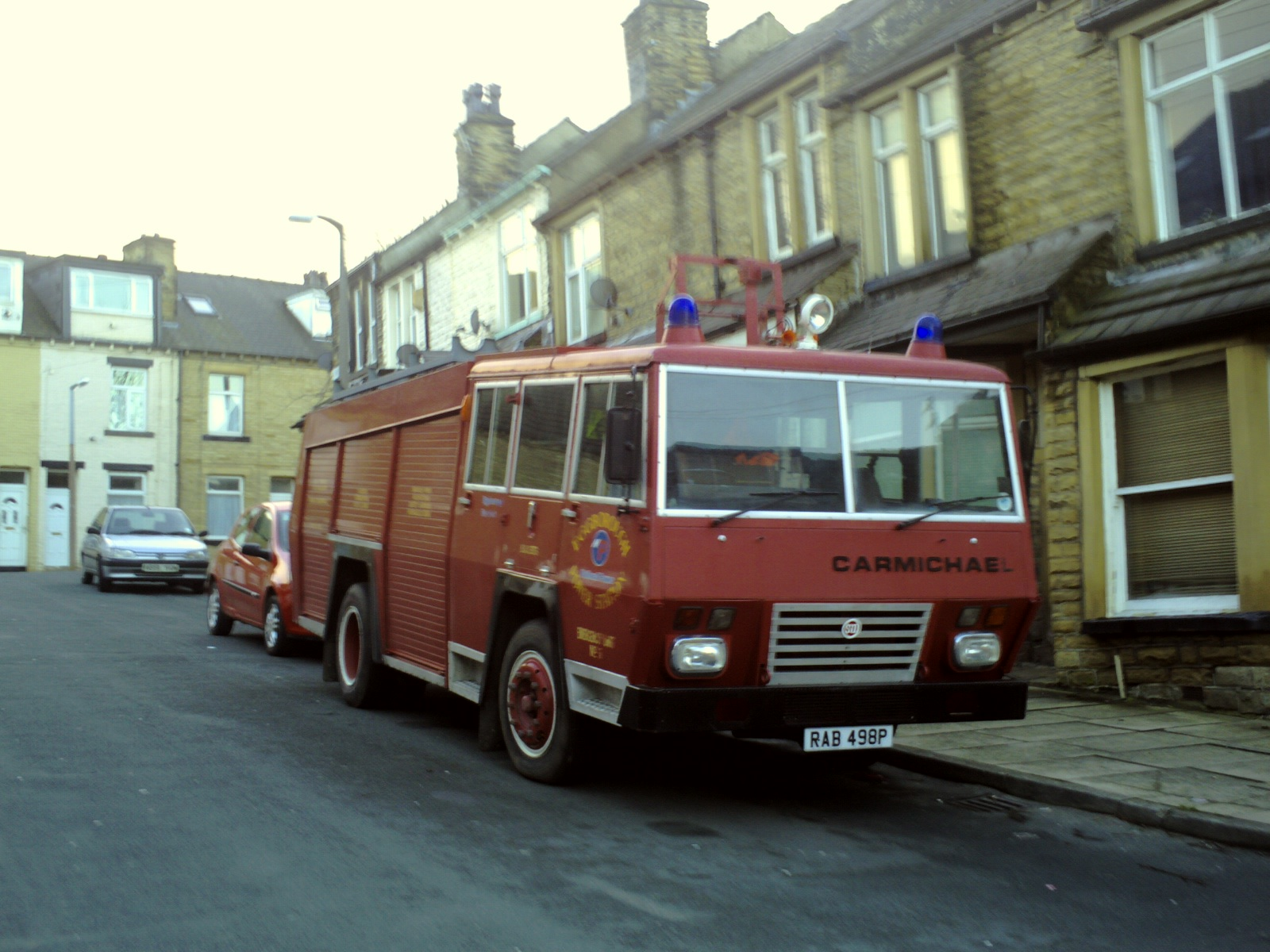
Shelvoke & Drewry SPV Carmichael Fire Tender at Bradford January 2008.

SD SPV/Carmichael Fire Tender Year of Manufacture: 1976cab

Original Operator: Hereford & Worcester Fire Brigade. Owner: Santa Pod Raceway Location: Northamptonshire

After service in Hereford & Worcester this appliance moved to Eggborough Power Station in Yorkshire. It was purchased early in 2008 when it had just over 19,000 miles on its mileometer. In 2010 it was again sold and moved to the Santa Pod Raceway to be used in emergencies. The April 2010 issue of Vintage Roadscene Magazine carried an article by Ron Henderson about these early SD SPV Fire Appliances.

=== YHV 186 T ===
SD SPV WX Pump Escape Year of Manufacture: 1979

Original Operator: London Fire Brigade. Owner: K. & T. Robertshaw Location: Greater Manchester.

London Fire Brigade had a total of 48 Shelvoke & Drewry WX Pump Escapes of which 21 were T Reg. and 27 W Reg plus ten WY chassis with hydraulic platforms. When the WX's were about two years old 29 were converted to pump ladders by fitting Angus Sacol 135 ladders. The T reg. appliances had Perkins 540 V8 engines whilst the W's had the faster Perkins 640 V8 engine.

=== YHV 187 T ===
SD SPV WX Pump Escape Year of Manufacture: 1979

Original Operator: London Fire Brigade. Owner: T. Prince Location: Essex.

See YHV 187 T this appliance retains the wheeled escape ladder, typical of London practice at the time. It currently carries a Merryweather 50' (15m) steel escape ladder. This appliance has had an extensive mechanical and bodywork restoration, and appears in almost new condition.

=== GYW 614 W ===
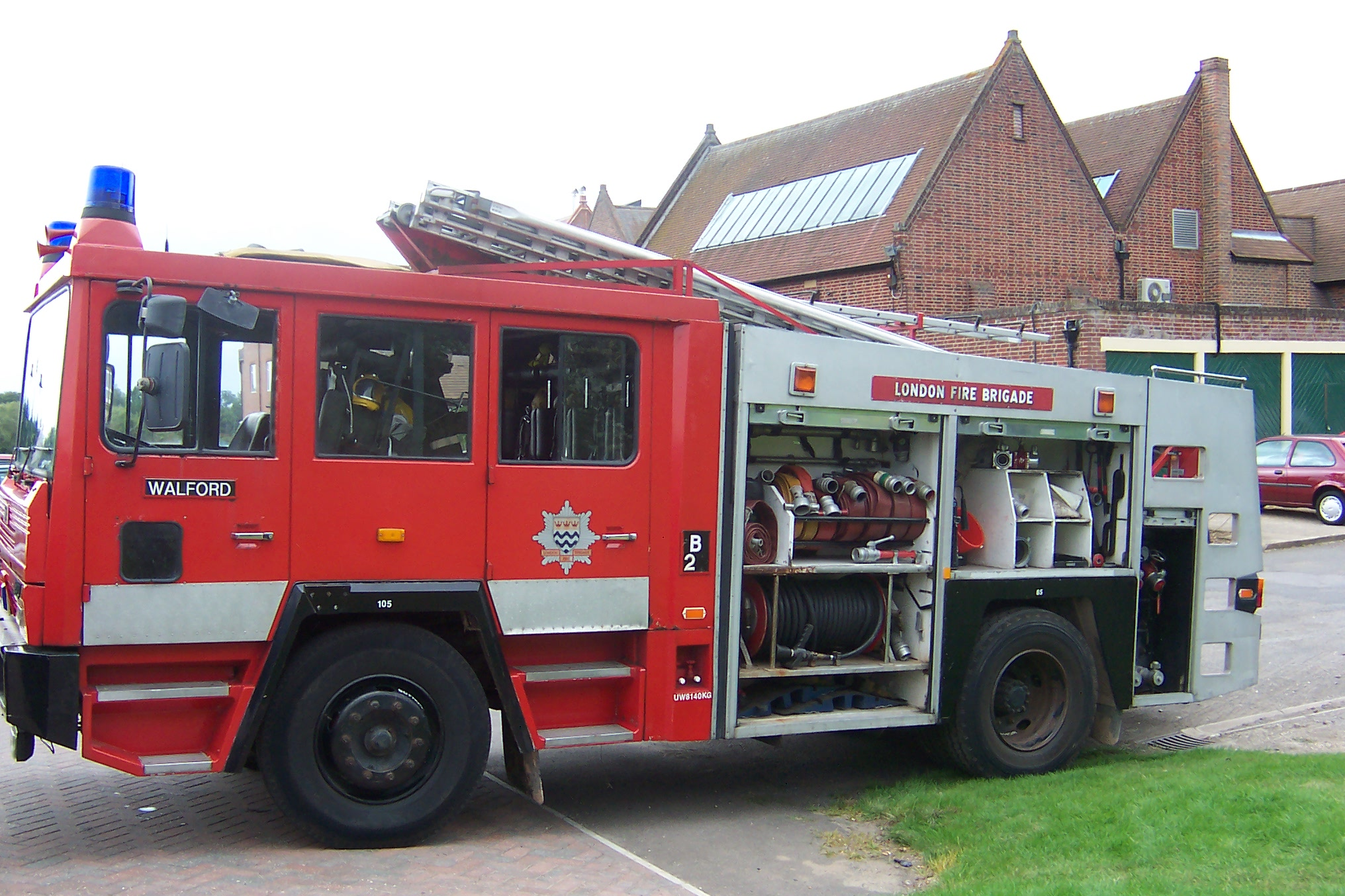
Ex-London Fire Brigade Shelvoke & Drewry SPV WX Pump ladder GYW 614W at Letchworth Hall Hotel on Sunday 12 September 2004.

SD SPV WX Pump Ladder Year of Manufacture: 1981

Original Operator: London Fire Brigade. Owner: C. Houghton Location: Essex.

This appliance was owned by Andy Lang and appeared at SD Remembered in September 2004.

=== GYW 628 W ===
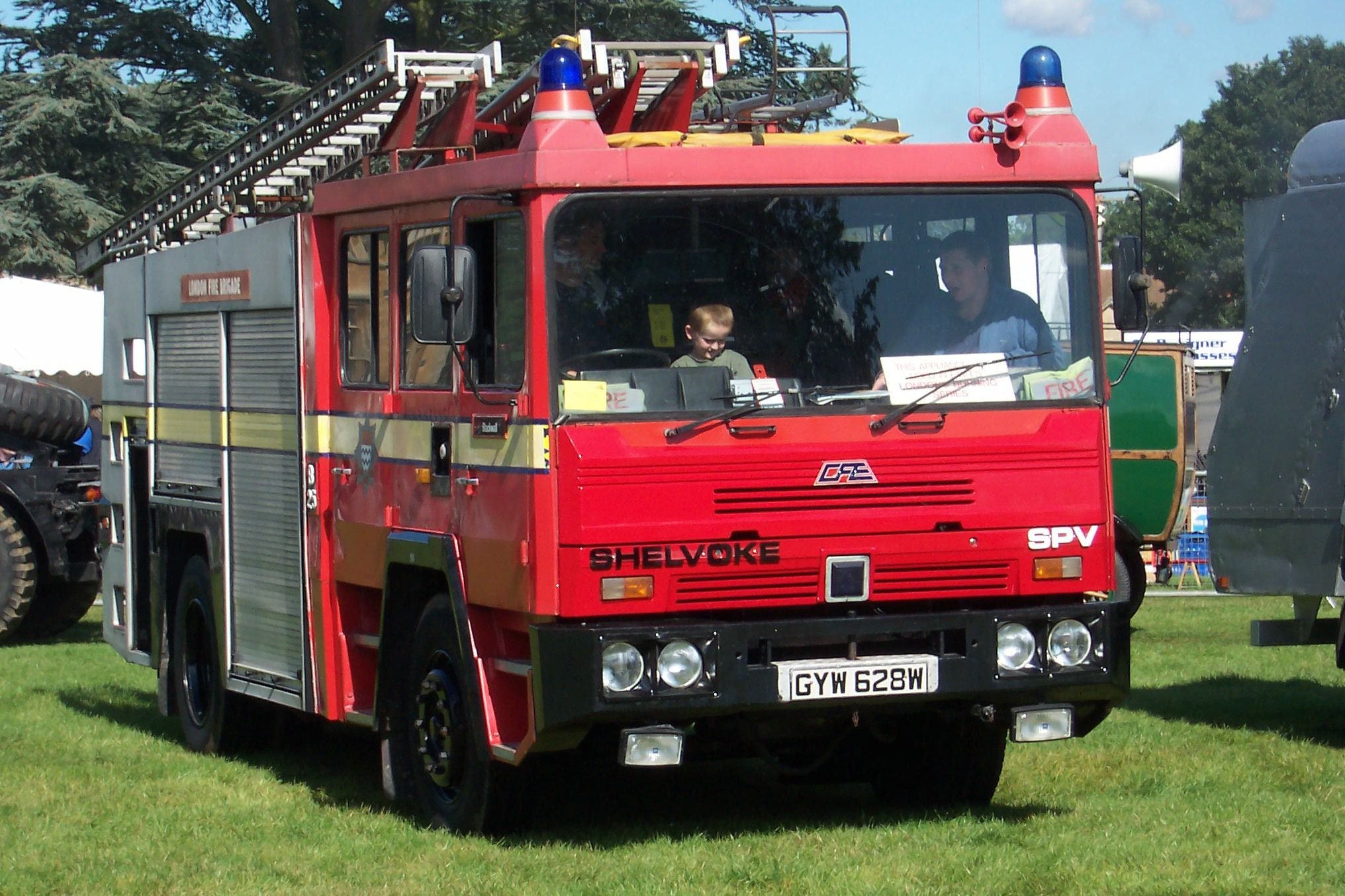
Shelvoke & Drewry SPV WX ex-London Fire Brigade Pump Ladder GYW 628W at Old Warden Steam Fair on Saturday 17 September 2005.

SD SPV WX Pump Ladder Year of Manufacture: 1981

Original Operator: London Fire Brigade. Owner: T. Prince Location: Essex.

See YHV 187 T this is one of 48 WX's operated by the London Fire Brigade. GYW 628W appeared in the popular London Weekend Television drama London's Burning, first as Blackwall Fire Station's pump ladder in the pilot movie and later as its pump in the 1988 Christmas Special 'Ding Dong Merrily' and the second series.

=== GYW 631 W ===
SD SPV WX Pump Ladder Year of Manufacture: 1981

Original Operator: London Fire Brigade. Owner: T. Prince Location: Essex.

See YHV 187 T this is another of London Fire Brigade's WX's.

=== EBB 847 W ===
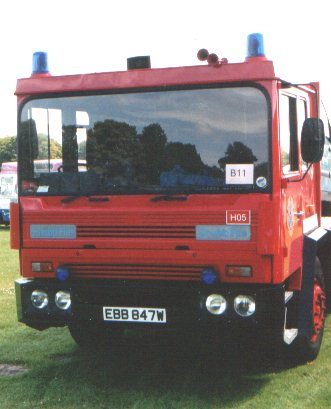
Ex-Tyne & Wear Shelvoke & Drewry SPV WY Foam Tender converted for carrying vintage fire appliances at Harrogate following the HCVS Trans-Pennine Run on Sunday 3 August 2003.

SD SPV WY Foam Tender now converted to an Operations Support Tender. Year of Manufacture: 1981

Original Operator: Tyne & Wear Fire Brigade.

Owner: Private Collection Location: N.E. England.

EBB 847 W was originally constructed by Chubb Fire on a Shelvoke & Drewry SPV WY chassis as a Foam Tender and was supplied to Tyne & Wear Metropolitan Fire Brigade in 1981 stationed at Whitley Bay fire station. It carried 800 gallons of foam compound in a dual compartment stainless steel tank. A 1000-gallon per minute low pressure pump was fitted at the rear of the machine. The vehicle is now converted to an Operations Support Tender for transporting preserved fire appliances to shows and rallies.

=== ETN 909 W ===
SD SPV WX Emergency Tender. Year of Manufacture: 1981

Original Operator: Tyne & Wear Fire Brigade. Owner: Private Collection Location: N.E. England.

ETN 909 W is a Shelvoke & Drewry Emergency Tender built on a Shelvoke WX SPV (special Purpose Vehicle) chassis fitted with Benson bodywork it was supplied new to Tyne & Wear Metropolitan Fire Brigade Fossway fire station in the East end of Newcastle. It is fitted with a Boughton 5 ton hydraulic winch and a 10 KW generator, which powers the extending lighting mast.

=== ANO 169 X ===
SD SPV WY Turntable Ladder converted to beavertail lorry. Year of Manufacture: 1982

Original Operator: Essex Fire Brigade. Owner: Unknown Location: Unknown.

Photo shown on Classic Commercial Vehicle Website.
