= Amberley Museum & Heritage Centre =

Industrial museum in West Sussex, England

Amberley Museum

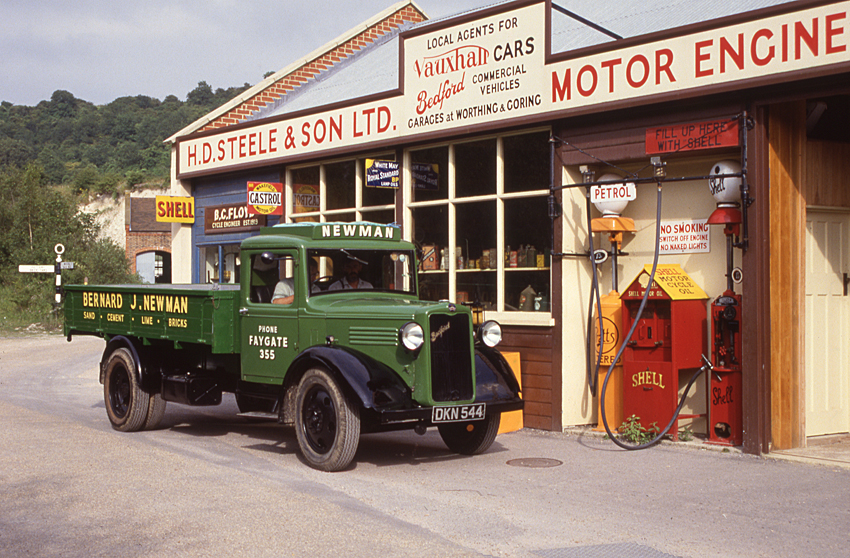
- Recreating the 1930s at Amberley

- Location within West Sussex
- Former name: Amberley Working Museum, Amberley Chalk Pits Museum, Amberley Museum & Heritage Centre
- Established: 1979
- Location: Amberley, West Sussex, England
- Coordinates: 50°53′53″N 0°32′22″W
- Type: Industrial heritage
- Accreditation: Association of Independent Museums, Museum Accreditation
- Visitors: 60,000 per year
- Public transit access: Amberley
- Parking: Amberley Museum Car Park
- Website: www.amberleymuseum.co.uk

Amberley Museum is an open-air industrial heritage museum at Amberley, near Arundel in West Sussex, England. The museum is owned and operated by Amberley Museum and Heritage Centre, a not-for-profit company and registered charity, and has the support of an active Friends organisation. The items in the Museums collection are held by The Amberley Museum Trust

The museum was founded in 1978 by the Southern Industrial History Centre Trust and has previously been known as the Amberley Working Museum, Amberley Chalk Pits Museum, and Amberley Museum and Heritage Centre. It is located within historic chalk quarries. Chalk was extracted and processed for lime on site for more than 100 years, and the museum still houses a number of its original lime kilns. In addition, holdings and exhibitions at the museum cover a diversity of industrial and local heritage collections, including narrow-gauge railways, local bus services, and a multitude of light and rural industrial subjects.

== Location ==
The open-air museum is 36-acre (146,000 m^{2}), located next to Amberley railway station and dedicated to the industrial heritage of South East England and with a special interest in aspects of the history of communications and transport.

The museum is sited in a former chalk quarry where the chalk was converted into lime for use in mortar and cement, and remaining on site are several kilns, including a De Witt set, and associated buildings including offices, bagging shed and locomotive shed.

Also to be seen is the quarry tunnel, which appeared as Mainstrike Mine in the James Bond film A View to a Kill. Additional buildings have been relocated or replicated on the site and exhibition halls added. The natural history and geology of the site can be seen from a nature trail.

== Exhibits and collections ==
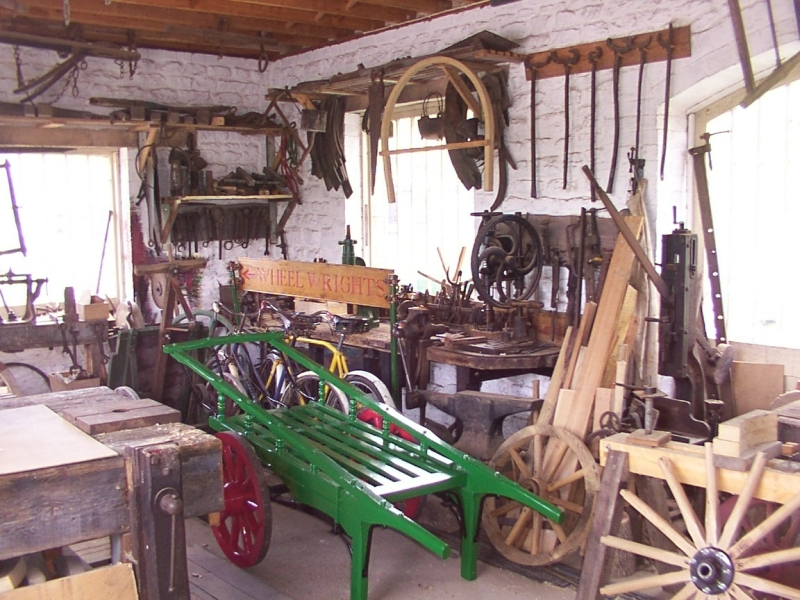
Wheelwright's Shop

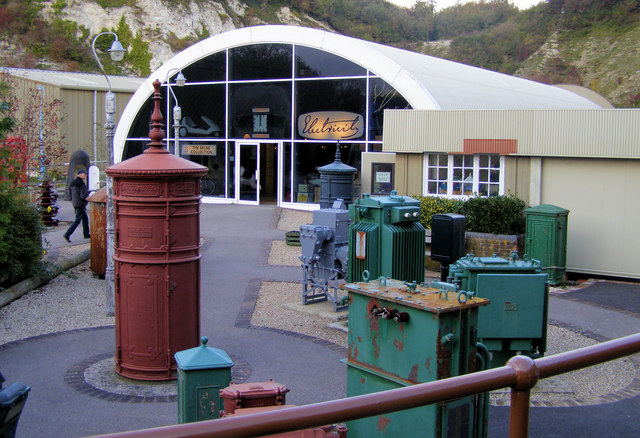
Electricity Pavilion

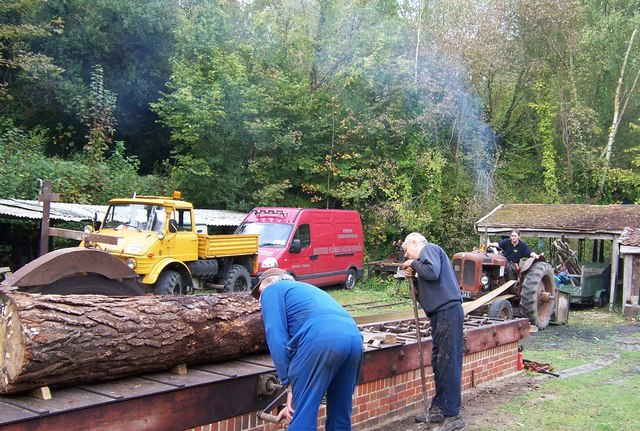
Sawing Logs at the timber yard

The site hosts a range and exhibitions and collections most of which can be seen though they may not be operational when the museum is open.

- Connected Earth telecommunications exhibition
- Electricity Hall
- Print Shop - The Museum has a print shop that houses printing machinery and artefacts, including a Columbian ‘Eagle’ flat-bed press (about 1856), engraved copper plates, Linotype machines used in newspaper production, and an Albion lever press amongst many others. Volunteers run the print shop and operate many of the machines to demonstrate for our visitors and to produce museum publications.
- Machine Shop includes display of various machine tools and hand tools used for metalwork. Machine tools are still in use for maintenance of exhibits
- Wheelwright's Shop, from Horsham
- Vintage Wireless and Communications exhibition and Amateur radio station
- Ockenden's Ironmonger's shop, from Littlehampton
- Timber yard and Steam crane
- Village Garage, a reconstructed 1930s automobile repair shop
- Paviors Hall of Road Making, located in a 19th-century iron-framed industrial building relocated from Horsham
- Display of road construction techniques from Roman to contemporary
- Cycle Exhibition (in Paviours Hall of Road Making building)
- Railway Hall displaying items including engines and wagons related to narrow-gauge industrial railways
- 'Billingshurst' Signal Box, A reconstructed signal box that was last used to control the level crossing at Billingshurst.
- Contractors Monorail used to move materials on construction sites
- Rural telephone exchange, incorporating 1940s equipment from Coolham
- Arundel Gin Building, housing a lead working and plumbing display
- Brickyard drying shed, late 19th century, from Petersfield, Hampshire
- Fairmile Café, a 1930s roadside cafe moved from the A29.
- Dover Cottage Pump House, from Arundel, and water pumping display
- Stationary engine shed, and Municipal engine house from Littlehampton
- Fire Station, reproduction of a typical 1950s building completed in 2008 and now housing several roadworthy historic fire engines and an impressive collection of displays and exhibits primarily relating to the history of fire-fighting in Sussex.
- Toll bridge hut, from Littlehampton swing bridge
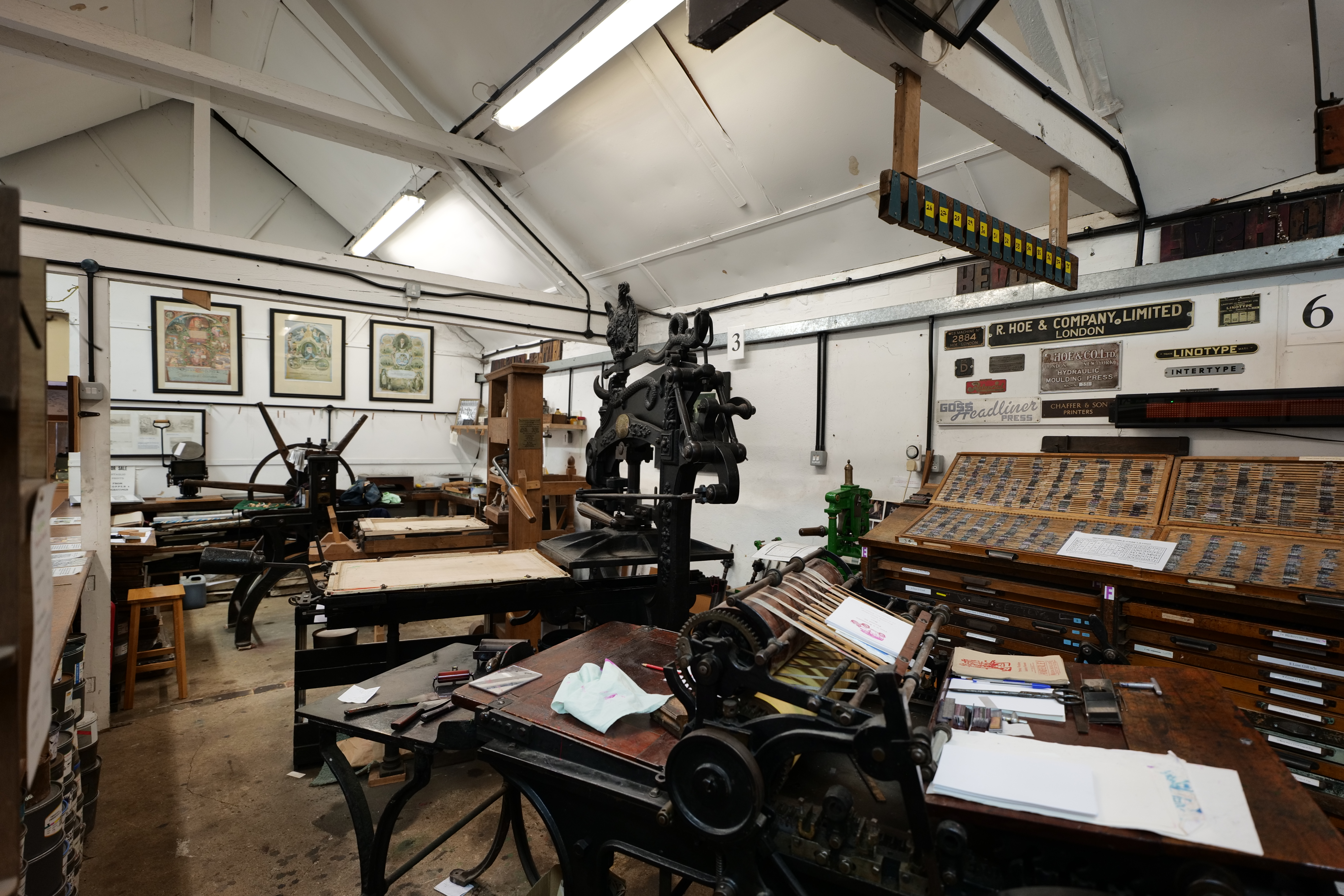
  Print Shop at Amberley Museum
- Working Printing Workshop
- Cobbler's shop, with equipment from Bognor Regis
- Hall of Tools, with associated demonstrations by the Tools and Trades History Society

=== Crafts ===
Crafts demonstrated on site include woodturning, broom-making, walking stick-making and the work of the blacksmith and potters. Special events are held regularly.

== Rail and bus collections ==
=== Amberley Narrow Gauge & Industrial Railway Collection ===
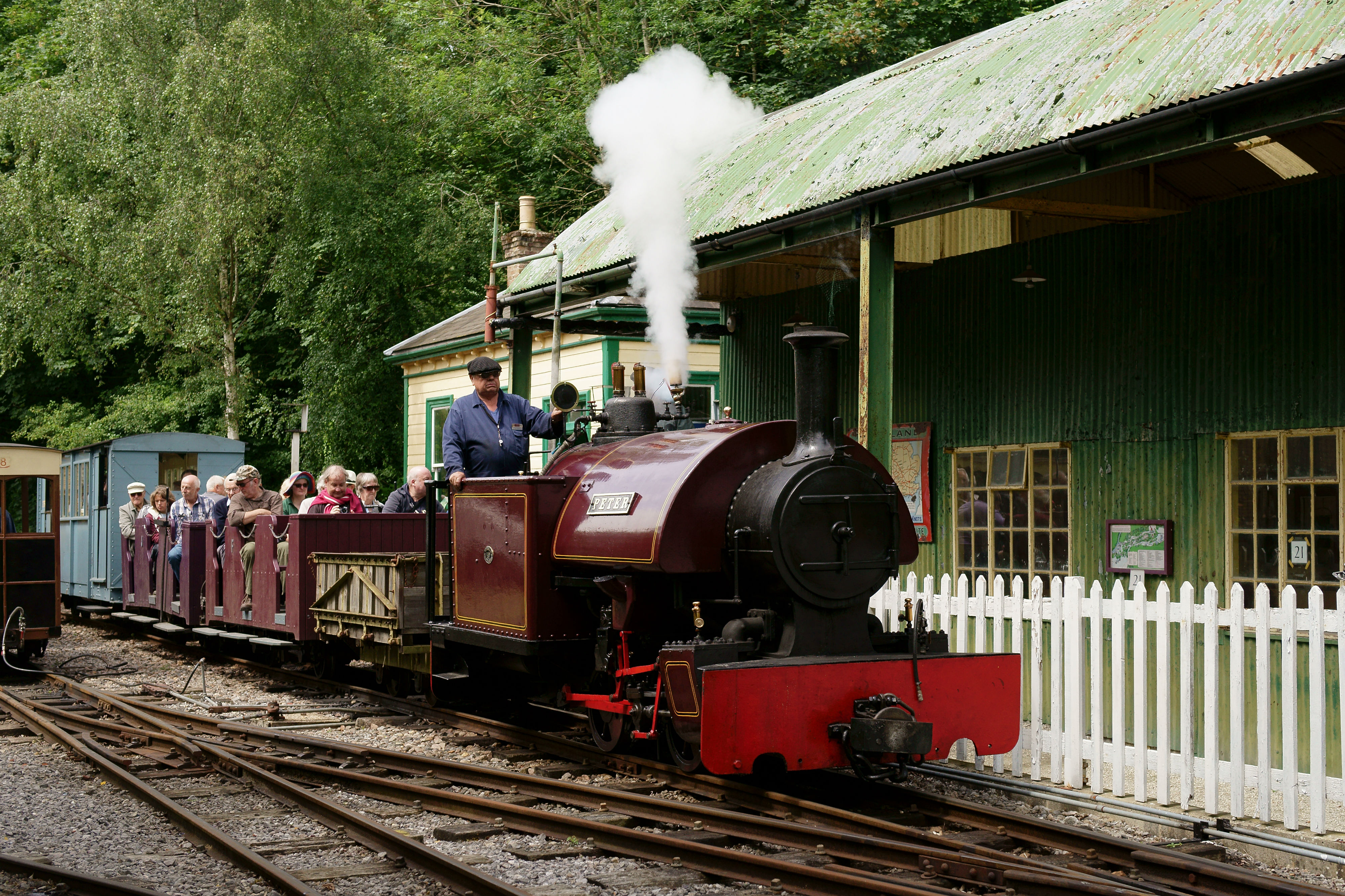
Narrow-gauge railway

The Amberley Museum Railway is a 2 ft (610 mm) narrow-gauge railway and railway exhibition hall devoted to British industrial narrow-gauge railways. There are 45 locomotives, with 5 being steam powered, 29 internal combustion and 4 battery electric, and around 80 items of rolling stock, chiefly goods wagons, based largely on the collection of the former Brockham Museum (relocated here in 1982). There is special interest in railway material from the Dorking Greystone Lime Company and also from the Groudle Glen Railway in the Isle of Man. Of the 5 steam locos, one currently operational.

=== Southdown Bus collection ===
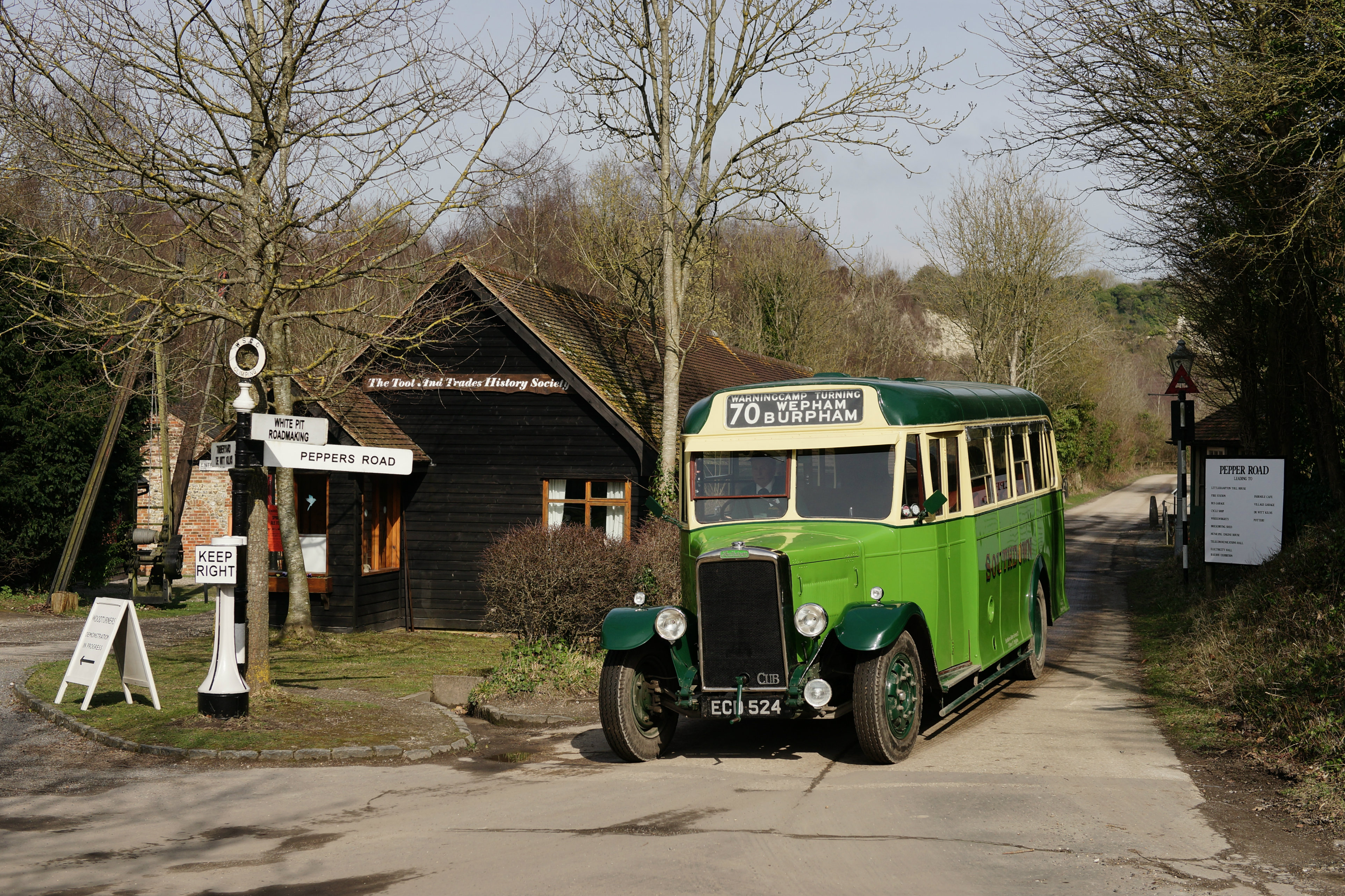
Southdown Leyland Cub No. 524 passes the Tool and Trades History Society Building

The collection completed by a reconstructed 1920s Southdown Bus garage. The depot houses working buses chiefly from the local operator Southdown Motor Services based on the collection of the Southdown Omnibus Trust

On open days the Southdown Bus collection operates bus rides throughout the day. The collection of vehicles is listed below.

Operational buses

- 1914 Worthing Motor Services/Southdown Tilling Stevens open-top 41-seater IB 552. (Restricted use because the bus is fragile)
- 1922 Southdown Leyland N Type open-top 51-seater CD 5125.
- 1927 Southdown Dennis 30 cwt single-deck UF 1517.
- 1928 Sunderland Corporation Leyland Lion LT1 single-deck BR 7132 (Privately Owned).
- 1930 Southdown Tilling Stevens B10 A2 single-deck 31-seater UF 6805.
- 1931 Southdown Leyland Titan TD1 double-deck 50-seater UF 6473.
- 1931 Southdown Leyland Titan TD1 double-deck 50-seater UF 7428.
- 1937 Southdown Leyland Cub single-deck 24-seater ECD 524.
- Replica 1938 Shelvoke and Drewry Worthing Tramocar BP9822 single-deck. (Small bus generally used at quiet times)

== See also ==
- Arundel Museum and Heritage Centre
- List of British railway museums
- British narrow-gauge railways
- Avoncroft Museum of Historic Buildings – Bromsgrove, England
