= Revopak =

A Revopak compactor in operation

The Revopak compaction system, showing clearly the rotating tines and fixed teeth

The Revopak is a type of waste collection vehicle manufactured by the British company Shelvoke and Drewry.

Introduced in 1971, the Revopak was a British-built clone of the French Bennes-Ray "Superpac". It was one of the first vehicles to address the problem of compacting and destroying the high content of packaging materials now found in domestic refuse.

By using a huge, hydraulic-powered rotating rake with large steel tines, refuse was scooped up from the loading hopper and forced through a set of stationary tines. The rotation of the rake increases the density of the load by continuously lifting the waste, mutilating it through the stationary tines, and then dropping it and repeating the cycle until it is small enough to be forced into the main body, where it is compacted, thus reducing the space required to dump it at the landfill site.

Two generations of the Revopak were produced - the early 1971-1973 models used hydraulic motors which drove the compaction rake by means of chains, while the later models used a simpler and more robust drive system which consisted of twin synchronised hydraulic rams to operate the compaction system. Many variations were made of the basic design, including a multitude of different body lengths and payloads, plus SD developed bin lifters as an optional extra - a precursor to the modern wheeled bin collection systems of today. One disadvantage of the system was heavier fuel consumption, since the compaction system has to run continuously in order to be effective.

The Revopak was in continuous production until 1990, when SD went out of business, although the French built unit is still manufactured by SEMAT.
